= List of locations in California by race =

List of counties and places

The following is a list of California locations by race.

According to 2010 data from the U.S. Census Bureau, people of White ancestry were the dominant racial group in California, comprising 61.8 percent of its population of 36,969,200. The county with the highest percentage of White residents was Nevada County (93.4 percent). The ten counties with the highest proportion of White residents were all relatively small. They had an average population of 60,460, and none had a population of over 200,000. In contrast, the counties with the lowest percentage of whites were much larger, with an average population of 1,999,943. The smallest of these counties was Solano County, with a population of 411,620. All counties in California had a White majority, except Alameda County. White was the only reported racial group in 142 places, comprising one in ten of the total. The largest of these places was Forest Meadows, with a population of 1,546. Most of the ten places with the lowest reported percentage of whites were in Los Angeles County, and two of these places — Buck Meadows and Lookout — reported only racial categories other than White.

Asian was the third most commonly reported race in California, behind some other race. Asians comprised 13.1 percent (4,825,271) of California's population. San Francisco County had the highest percentage of Asians of any county in California (33.5 percent). Of the thirteen counties in which Asians comprised more than 10 percent of the population, the average had a population of 1,138,957. The ten counties with the lowest percentages of Asians were small (with an average population of 28,348) and landlocked. Of the nineteen places in California with the largest percentages of Asians, thirteen were in Los Angeles County, all but two very small places had a population of at least 7,000, and all but three had a population of at least 10,000. Buck Meadows, with a reported population of 12, was the only place in which Asian was the only reported racial group. Monterey Park, with a population of 60,251, had the highest percentage of Asians (65.4 percent) for all places with a population larger than 100. Asians are a rather concentrated racial group, with roughly one-third (490) of California's places reporting no Asians whatsoever, and only about one place in ten (183) reporting percentages of Asians greater than or equal to the state percentage.

Black or African American was the fourth most commonly reported racial group in California, comprising 6.1 percent (2,252,129) of the state's population, roughly half that of Asians. Solano County had the highest percentage of those reporting Black or African American as their race (14.6 percent), and they surpassed 10 percent in two other counties: Alameda (12.5 percent) and Sacramento (10.2 percent). Alpine County was the only county which reported exclusively racial groups other than Black or African American. Of the ten counties in California with the lowest percentage of Blacks or African Americans, all are relatively small (with an average population of 86,038), and all but Santa Cruz County are landlocked. In contrast, most of the ten counties with the highest percentages of Blacks or African Americans had rather high populations, with an average population of 1,918,645. View Park-Windsor Hills had the highest percentage of Blacks or African Americans of all places in California (83.8 percent), and all places reporting a majority of this racial group were in Los Angeles County. This racial group was even more concentrated than Asians were, with roughly four in ten (603) places not reporting this racial group at all and with only about place in ten (201) reporting a concentration above that of the state.

Native Americans, defined in this article as the sum of those reported their race as American Indian, Alaska Native, Native Hawaiian, or other Pacific Islanders, comprised more than 10 percent of the population in two counties: Alpine County (22.1 percent) and Inyo County (10.4 percent). Crows Landing had the highest percentage of Native Americans of any place in California (62.8 percent), and Native Americans comprised a majority of the population in a total of six places. In no case did a place that reported more than 10 percent of its population as Native American have a population of over 5,000. The place with the highest concentration of Native Americans and with a population of over 5,000 was East Palo Alto, in which 9.8 percent of the population was Native American.

Hispanic or Latino was the most commonly reported race or ethnic group in California other than White. Hispanics or Latinos may be of any race, but they report their race as either White or some other race in the vast majority of cases (see Relation between ethnicity and race in census results). They comprised 37.2 percent (13,752,743) of California's total population and comprised the majority of the population in eight counties. Of these counties, Imperial County reported the highest concentration (79.6 percent). Notably, Imperial County also borders Mexico. Of the ten counties which reported the highest concentration of Hispanics or Latinos, all but Monterey County were landlocked. On the other hand, the ten counties which reported the lowest concentrations of Hispanic or Latinos were also all landlocked. None of these counties have populations over 200,000 and their average population was 65,633. The county that reported the lowest concentration of Hispanics or Latinos was Trinity County (6.7 percent) with a population of just 13,711. Although San Diego County also borders Mexico, it nevertheless had a lower percentage of Hispanics or Latinos than nearby counties which don't.

Hispanics or Latinos comprised roughly the entire population in twelve places, the largest of these being Del Rey, with a population of 1,625. Another one of these places, Kettleman City, also had a population of more than 1,000. These places are also all located in either Tulare County or Fresno County. Sixty-seven places in total had concentrations of Hispanics or Latinos above 90 percent; the largest of these places was East Los Angeles. Three hundred and twenty-nine places, roughly one in five, had a majority. Roughly one in ten (190) places reported no Hispanics or Latinos, and in no case did the populations of these places exceed 3,000. The largest of these places was Kelly Ridge, with a population of 2,246.

== Entire state ==
Total population	36,969,200	
White (including White Hispanic)	22,860,341	61.8%
Black or African American	2,252,129	6.1%
American Indian or Alaska Native	287,712	0.8%
Asian	4,825,271	13.1%
Native Hawaiian or other Pacific Islander	141,382	0.4%
Some other race	5,142,478	13.9%
Two or more races	1,459,887	3.9%
Hispanic or Latino (of any race)	13,752,743	37.2%

== Counties ==
County	Population	White	Other (Note: Other = Some other race + Two or more races)	Asian	Black or African American	Native American (Note: Native American = Native Hawaiian or other Pacific Islander + American Indian or Alaska Native)	Hispanic or Latino (of any race)
Alameda	1,494,876	46.2%	13.9%	26.2%	12.5%	1.3%	22.2%
Alpine	1,167	66.1%	8.5%	3.3%	0.0%	22.1%	7.0%
Amador	38,244	87.5%	6.3%	1.4%	2.3%	2.5%	12.2%
Butte	219,309	83.3%	9.6%	4.2%	1.5%	1.4%	13.9%
Calaveras	45,794	91.0%	5.3%	1.3%	1.1%	1.3%	10.2%
Colusa	21,297	68.0%	28.3%	1.2%	1.0%	1.5%	53.8%
Contra Costa	1,037,817	63.2%	12.5%	14.3%	9.1%	0.9%	23.9%
Del Norte	28,561	72.8%	14.3%	3.1%	3.3%	6.4%	17.5%
El Dorado	179,878	87.8%	6.9%	3.5%	0.8%	1.1%	11.8%
Fresno	920,623	60.0%	24.3%	9.5%	5.1%	1.1%	49.8%
Glenn	28,027	78.3%	15.7%	2.3%	0.9%	2.8%	36.6%
Humboldt	133,585	82.7%	7.7%	2.3%	1.2%	6.1%	9.6%
Imperial	171,343	67.4%	25.7%	1.6%	3.5%	1.8%	79.6%
Inyo	18,457	77.7%	9.4%	1.5%	1.1%	10.4%	18.7%
Kern	829,254	69.0%	20.1%	4.0%	5.7%	1.2%	48.5%
Kings	152,335	72.0%	15.5%	3.8%	7.2%	1.5%	50.2%
Lake	64,392	84.6%	8.7%	1.1%	2.2%	3.4%	16.7%
Lassen	35,001	70.0%	15.7%	1.3%	8.7%	4.2%	17.4%
Los Angeles	9,787,747	52.4%	24.5%	13.8%	8.6%	0.8%	47.5%
Madera	149,611	80.9%	11.6%	2.0%	3.3%	2.2%	52.8%
Marin	250,666	79.9%	11.0%	5.6%	3.0%	0.5%	14.9%
Mariposa	18,290	89.4%	6.4%	1.1%	1.0%	2.1%	9.4%
Mendocino	87,525	82.9%	9.1%	1.8%	1.1%	5.1%	21.7%
Merced	253,606	67.1%	20.3%	7.5%	3.9%	1.2%	54.4%
Modoc	9,587	87.5%	7.1%	0.8%	1.1%	3.5%	13.5%
Mono	14,016	80.7%	12.6%	0.6%	1.3%	4.9%	25.8%
Monterey	411,385	72.0%	17.3%	6.2%	3.1%	1.4%	54.6%
Napa	135,377	81.3%	8.9%	6.8%	2.0%	1.1%	31.5%
Nevada	98,392	92.4%	4.3%	1.4%	0.5%	1.4%	8.3%
Orange	2,989,948	62.0%	17.8%	17.8%	1.7%	0.7%	33.3%
Placer	343,554	84.7%	7.0%	6.0%	1.3%	1.0%	12.6%
Plumas	20,192	91.5%	3.3%	1.0%	1.4%	2.9%	8.0%
Riverside	2,154,844	66.0%	20.4%	5.9%	6.3%	1.3%	45.0%
Sacramento	1,408,480	60.0%	13.5%	14.3%	10.2%	1.9%	21.2%
San Benito	54,873	76.2%	18.8%	2.4%	1.3%	1.3%	55.6%
San Bernardino	2,023,452	61.3%	22.4%	6.3%	8.7%	1.3%	48.6%
San Diego	3,060,849	71.3%	11.6%	10.9%	5.0%	1.1%	31.6%
San Francisco	797,983	51.2%	8.2%	33.5%	6.2%	0.9%	14.9%
San Joaquin	680,277	59.3%	17.4%	14.4%	7.4%	1.5%	38.3%
San Luis Obispo	267,871	83.9%	9.6%	3.2%	2.2%	1.1%	20.4%
San Mateo	711,622	59.6%	11.1%	24.6%	2.9%	1.8%	24.9%
Santa Barbara	419,793	76.4%	15.6%	5.0%	1.8%	1.2%	41.9%
Santa Clara	1,762,754	50.9%	13.8%	31.8%	2.6%	0.9%	26.6%
Santa Cruz	259,402	82.6%	11.6%	4.2%	1.0%	0.6%	31.4%
Shasta	177,231	87.9%	6.2%	2.6%	0.9%	2.3%	8.3%
Sierra	3,277	92.5%	5.9%	0.1%	1.2%	0.3%	7.5%
Siskiyou	44,687	87.1%	7.2%	1.3%	1.2%	3.2%	10.2%
Solano	411,620	52.1%	17.5%	14.4%	14.6%	1.4%	23.6%
Sonoma	478,551	81.6%	11.3%	4.0%	1.5%	1.6%	24.3%
Stanislaus	512,469	76.4%	13.8%	5.2%	2.9%	1.7%	41.3%
Sutter	94,192	65.8%	16.7%	13.8%	1.9%	1.8%	28.3%
Tehama	62,985	85.1%	10.6%	1.2%	0.7%	2.4%	21.4%
Trinity	13,711	89.0%	7.5%	1.2%	0.4%	2.0%	6.7%
Tulare	436,234	78.7%	14.9%	3.5%	1.6%	1.4%	59.8%
Tuolumne	55,736	87.0%	7.9%	1.1%	2.1%	2.0%	10.5%
Ventura	815,745	70.9%	19.1%	6.9%	1.8%	1.3%	39.7%
Yolo	198,889	66.7%	16.1%	12.9%	2.5%	1.8%	29.8%
Yuba	71,817	69.7%	18.4%	7.0%	2.6%	2.3%	24.6%

== Cities and unincorporated places ==
Place	County/ies (Note: In the four instances where CDPs cross county lines, both counties are listed.)	Population	White	Other	Asian	Black or African American	Native American	Hispanic or Latino (of any race)
Acalanes Ridge	Contra Costa	1,431	71.6%	14.0%	11.8%	0.0%	2.6%	4.8%
Acampo	San Joaquin	387	100.0%	0.0%	0.0%	0.0%	0.0%	92.2%
Acton	Los Angeles	7,138	87.5%	10.9%	1.2%	0.2%	0.3%	15.8%
Adelanto	San Bernardino	30,670	55.5%	19.4%	2.4%	21.1%	1.5%	51.8%
Adin	Modoc	418	96.7%	0.0%	0.0%	0.0%	3.3%	2.2%
Agoura Hills	Los Angeles	20,353	83.1%	9.0%	6.4%	1.6%	0.0%	11.4%
Agua Dulce	Los Angeles	2,991	93.4%	5.4%	1.2%	0.0%	0.0%	17.6%
Aguanga	Riverside	1,540	91.2%	6.1%	0.0%	2.7%	0.0%	8.7%
Ahwahnee	Madera	1,685	99.9%	0.0%	0.1%	0.0%	0.0%	0.1%
Airport	Stanislaus	1,490	78.7%	16.3%	0.0%	0.0%	5.0%	61.7%
Alameda	Alameda	73,239	49.5%	9.8%	33.1%	6.7%	0.9%	11.8%
Alamo	Contra Costa	15,531	88.6%	3.4%	7.1%	0.6%	0.2%	3.6%
Albany	Alameda	18,217	60.7%	7.0%	29.1%	3.0%	0.1%	9.7%
Albion	Mendocino	255	80.0%	14.5%	5.5%	0.0%	0.0%	12.2%
Alderpoint	Humboldt	113	100.0%	0.0%	0.0%	0.0%	0.0%	0.0%
Alhambra	Los Angeles	83,301	28.2%	16.3%	53.4%	1.6%	0.5%	33.5%
Alhambra Valley	Contra Costa	910	98.6%	0.0%	1.4%	0.0%	0.0%	0.0%
Aliso Viejo	Orange	47,037	71.3%	11.6%	13.6%	3.3%	0.1%	17.0%
Alleghany	Sierra	65	100.0%	0.0%	0.0%	0.0%	0.0%	0.0%
Allendale	Solano	1,968	86.1%	10.7%	3.2%	0.0%	0.0%	14.7%
Allensworth	Tulare	281	90.7%	0.4%	1.8%	7.1%	0.0%	84.7%
Almanor	Plumas	10	100.0%	0.0%	0.0%	0.0%	0.0%	0.0%
Alondra Park	Los Angeles	8,358	38.8%	34.3%	14.6%	11.2%	1.1%	48.7%
Alpaugh	Tulare	847	86.3%	9.6%	0.0%	2.4%	1.8%	74.5%
Alpine	San Diego	13,332	87.9%	8.7%	1.3%	1.4%	0.7%	15.8%
Alpine Village	Alpine	180	47.2%	0.0%	0.0%	0.0%	52.8%	1.7%
Alta	Placer	549	97.6%	2.0%	0.0%	0.0%	0.4%	9.8%
Altadena	Los Angeles	45,006	62.8%	9.1%	4.0%	23.7%	0.3%	29.1%
Alta Sierra	Nevada	6,888	93.6%	3.7%	1.5%	0.0%	1.2%	8.2%
Alto	Marin	741	96.8%	3.2%	0.0%	0.0%	0.0%	16.5%
Alturas	Modoc	2,813	86.8%	5.4%	1.6%	1.3%	4.8%	6.9%
Alum Rock	Santa Clara	11,814	60.5%	25.7%	11.3%	2.0%	0.5%	73.0%
Amador City	Amador	158	100.0%	0.0%	0.0%	0.0%	0.0%	0.0%
American Canyon	Napa	18,489	48.7%	9.4%	33.4%	6.5%	2.0%	24.7%
Amesti	Santa Cruz	3,599	96.0%	3.3%	0.4%	0.0%	0.3%	69.5%
Anaheim	Orange	335,057	60.2%	21.8%	14.6%	2.7%	0.7%	53.0%
Anchor Bay	Mendocino	361	97.8%	2.2%	0.0%	0.0%	0.0%	0.0%
Anderson	Shasta	9,927	86.4%	6.5%	3.1%	1.4%	2.6%	10.4%
Angels	Calaveras	3,820	94.9%	5.1%	0.0%	0.0%	0.0%	17.7%
Angwin	Napa	3,179	69.6%	9.9%	13.1%	7.1%	0.3%	25.3%
Antelope	Sacramento	46,343	66.8%	10.5%	10.8%	10.4%	1.6%	13.7%
Antioch	Contra Costa	101,118	51.7%	19.2%	9.8%	17.5%	1.8%	32.1%
Anza	Riverside	3,111	82.9%	12.6%	0.0%	0.4%	4.2%	31.7%
Apple Valley	San Bernardino	68,316	76.6%	10.1%	2.0%	10.4%	0.9%	28.7%
Aptos	Santa Cruz	6,121	91.9%	2.3%	3.8%	1.6%	0.5%	14.9%
Aptos Hills-Larkin Valley	Santa Cruz	2,557	97.2%	2.0%	0.4%	0.0%	0.4%	29.8%
Arbuckle	Colusa	3,236	55.3%	43.9%	0.5%	0.0%	0.3%	66.0%
Arcadia	Los Angeles	55,993	33.1%	8.4%	56.9%	1.2%	0.4%	12.9%
Arcata	Humboldt	17,118	81.4%	8.0%	3.1%	2.7%	4.8%	12.2%
Arden-Arcade	Sacramento	91,132	73.4%	11.4%	5.5%	8.5%	1.2%	17.5%
Armona	Kings	3,419	74.1%	11.9%	4.6%	8.9%	0.6%	58.6%
Arnold	Calaveras	3,172	93.0%	6.7%	0.0%	0.0%	0.3%	6.9%
Aromas	Monterey; San Benito	2,532	82.7%	11.0%	4.9%	0.0%	1.4%	23.7%
Arroyo Grande	San Luis Obispo	17,132	85.8%	6.7%	5.0%	1.6%	0.8%	12.7%
Artesia	Los Angeles	16,495	37.9%	22.6%	34.8%	3.9%	0.8%	35.7%
Artois	Glenn	189	87.8%	12.2%	0.0%	0.0%	0.0%	12.2%
Arvin	Kern	18,809	65.9%	32.0%	0.6%	0.4%	1.1%	91.0%
Ashland	Alameda	22,106	53.4%	11.9%	16.4%	17.0%	1.3%	46.7%
Aspen Springs	Mono	0	0.0%	0.0%	0.0%	0.0%	0.0%	0.0%
Atascadero	San Luis Obispo	28,194	88.5%	5.7%	1.7%	1.7%	2.4%	13.7%
Atherton	San Mateo	6,883	84.8%	4.1%	10.0%	0.2%	0.9%	5.1%
Atwater	Merced	27,922	66.0%	21.6%	7.0%	4.3%	1.1%	49.2%
Auberry	Fresno	2,259	87.7%	4.3%	0.5%	0.1%	7.4%	9.3%
Auburn	Placer	13,476	90.4%	6.7%	1.2%	1.0%	0.7%	6.6%
Auburn Lake Trails	El Dorado	3,741	97.0%	1.5%	0.2%	1.0%	0.3%	2.3%
August	San Joaquin	8,017	63.3%	27.1%	4.2%	2.2%	3.2%	70.6%
Avalon	Los Angeles	3,690	93.7%	5.5%	0.4%	0.5%	0.0%	61.7%
Avenal	Kings	15,705	73.1%	23.1%	0.3%	3.1%	0.4%	86.4%
Avery	Calaveras	415	100.0%	0.0%	0.0%	0.0%	0.0%	0.0%
Avilla Beach	San Luis Obispo	1,086	91.4%	8.6%	0.0%	0.0%	0.0%	2.2%
Avocado Heights	Los Angeles	15,378	38.4%	50.3%	9.6%	1.6%	0.1%	80.2%
Azusa	Los Angeles	46,177	44.9%	41.8%	8.0%	4.0%	1.3%	67.0%
Baker	San Bernardino	713	37.0%	52.5%	0.0%	8.7%	1.8%	69.6%
Bakersfield	Kern	339,761	62.9%	21.9%	5.9%	8.2%	1.1%	44.5%
Baldwin Park	Los Angeles	75,441	35.5%	47.7%	15.1%	0.9%	0.8%	78.8%
Ballard	Santa Barbara	429	94.6%	4.4%	0.0%	0.0%	0.9%	5.4%
Ballico	Merced	384	72.1%	24.7%	1.6%	0.0%	1.6%	49.2%
Bangor	Butte	416	88.5%	5.0%	2.2%	0.0%	4.3%	0.0%
Banning	Riverside	29,414	76.9%	8.8%	6.8%	6.7%	0.7%	37.0%
Barstow	San Bernardino	22,913	58.8%	18.0%	1.7%	16.4%	5.0%	39.6%
Bass Lake	Madera	473	96.6%	0.0%	0.0%	0.0%	3.4%	3.4%
Bay Point	Contra Costa	21,987	51.0%	28.5%	7.6%	12.1%	0.8%	54.1%
Bayview (Contra Costa County)	Contra Costa	2,168	55.5%	9.7%	18.2%	15.3%	1.3%	29.6%
Bayview (Humboldt County)	Humboldt	2,818	82.9%	11.9%	0.8%	0.0%	4.4%	25.2%
Beale AFB	Yuba	1,818	65.6%	26.7%	5.2%	1.9%	0.7%	18.1%
Bear Creek	Merced	188	44.7%	55.3%	0.0%	0.0%	0.0%	89.4%
Bear Valley (Alpine County)	Alpine	71	87.3%	12.7%	0.0%	0.0%	0.0%	12.7%
Bear Valley (Mariposa County)	Mariposa	255	100.0%	0.0%	0.0%	0.0%	0.0%	0.0%
Bear Valley Springs	Kern	5,273	90.5%	7.1%	1.8%	0.4%	0.1%	8.9%
Beaumont	Riverside	34,737	72.5%	12.0%	10.1%	4.6%	0.8%	37.6%
Beckwourth	Plumas	460	94.3%	5.7%	0.0%	0.0%	0.0%	0.0%
Belden	Plumas	56	55.4%	0.0%	44.6%	0.0%	0.0%	0.0%
Bell	Los Angeles	35,602	64.5%	33.4%	0.3%	1.2%	0.6%	92.1%
Bella Vista	Shasta	2,344	97.1%	0.4%	0.8%	0.0%	1.7%	6.0%
Bell Canyon	Ventura	2,291	83.9%	3.0%	10.3%	0.0%	2.7%	3.4%
Bellflower	Los Angeles	76,243	35.0%	38.7%	11.1%	14.0%	1.3%	50.7%
Bell Gardens	Los Angeles	42,294	63.0%	35.4%	0.3%	1.0%	0.4%	97.0%
Belmont	San Mateo	25,568	66.6%	8.1%	22.4%	2.5%	0.3%	12.2%
Belvedere	Marin	2,118	95.0%	3.4%	1.2%	0.4%	0.0%	7.6%
Benbow	Humboldt	415	91.8%	8.2%	0.0%	0.0%	0.0%	8.2%
Bend	Tehama	620	93.1%	3.7%	1.5%	0.0%	1.8%	3.5%
Benicia	Solano	26,981	75.6%	10.4%	9.3%	3.1%	1.7%	12.2%
Ben Lomond	Santa Cruz	6,493	96.0%	2.7%	1.2%	0.0%	0.0%	6.4%
Benton	Mono	76	67.1%	0.0%	0.0%	0.0%	32.9%	27.6%
Berkeley	Alameda	111,008	61.5%	8.0%	20.6%	9.3%	0.6%	10.5%
Bermuda Dunes	Riverside	7,047	88.5%	4.1%	1.1%	6.3%	0.0%	25.4%
Berry Creek	Butte	1,305	85.9%	11.7%	0.2%	0.0%	2.1%	4.1%
Bertsch-Oceanview	Del Norte	2,729	77.9%	13.6%	1.1%	0.0%	7.4%	8.1%
Bethel Island	Contra Costa	1,882	92.2%	5.6%	2.2%	0.0%	0.0%	11.8%
Beverly Hills	Los Angeles	34,042	85.9%	4.3%	6.8%	2.8%	0.2%	5.7%
Bieber	Lassen	280	82.5%	16.1%	1.4%	0.0%	0.0%	16.1%
Big Bear City	San Bernardino	11,504	82.3%	13.7%	1.1%	1.3%	1.6%	23.7%
Big Bear Lake	San Bernardino	5,109	74.9%	20.9%	0.0%	1.8%	2.3%	24.0%
Big Bend	Shasta	95	89.5%	0.0%	5.3%	5.3%	0.0%	11.6%
Big Creek	Fresno	227	69.6%	26.9%	0.0%	0.0%	3.5%	11.5%
Biggs	Butte	1,927	74.2%	19.8%	3.3%	0.6%	2.1%	35.6%
Big Lagoon	Humboldt	179	48.0%	0.0%	0.0%	0.0%	52.0%	1.7%
Big Pine	Inyo	1,563	77.4%	7.8%	1.5%	1.0%	12.3%	11.5%
Big River	San Bernardino	1,213	88.0%	8.9%	0.0%	0.0%	3.1%	12.1%
Biola	Fresno	1,066	60.6%	20.7%	17.7%	0.0%	0.9%	72.2%
Bishop	Inyo	3,839	78.5%	17.6%	2.6%	0.1%	1.2%	31.2%
Blackhawk	Contra Costa	9,186	72.2%	4.9%	19.0%	4.0%	0.0%	5.8%
Blacklake	San Luis Obispo	1,014	97.1%	0.0%	1.5%	0.0%	1.4%	0.8%
Black Point-Green Point	Marin	1,204	93.4%	5.8%	0.8%	0.0%	0.0%	7.8%
Blairsden	Plumas	32	53.1%	46.9%	0.0%	0.0%	0.0%	53.1%
Bloomfield	Sonoma	186	93.0%	0.0%	7.0%	0.0%	0.0%	3.2%
Bloomington	San Bernardino	25,234	60.9%	33.2%	0.8%	3.5%	1.6%	83.5%
Blue Lake	Humboldt	1,336	84.6%	3.6%	1.6%	2.2%	8.1%	5.0%
Bluewater	San Bernardino	114	100.0%	0.0%	0.0%	0.0%	0.0%	10.5%
Blythe	Riverside	21,102	62.4%	18.8%	2.0%	15.9%	0.9%	48.5%
Bodega	Sonoma	132	100.0%	0.0%	0.0%	0.0%	0.0%	0.0%
Bodega Bay	Sonoma	772	87.2%	3.5%	9.3%	0.0%	0.0%	4.9%
Bodfish	Kern	1,982	91.2%	1.7%	0.0%	0.0%	7.2%	4.8%
Bolinas	Marin	1,117	89.3%	1.7%	3.8%	5.2%	0.0%	4.7%
Bombay Beach	Imperial	459	69.7%	0.0%	0.0%	30.3%	0.0%	0.0%
Bonadelle Ranchos-Madera Ranchos	Madera	8,400	83.1%	8.0%	3.1%	5.3%	0.4%	26.0%
Bonita	San Diego	13,824	74.1%	10.9%	9.3%	4.1%	1.6%	46.7%
Bonny Doon	Santa Cruz	2,342	89.9%	4.1%	2.1%	2.2%	1.8%	5.5%
Bonsall	San Diego	3,836	78.3%	12.0%	5.7%	3.9%	0.0%	16.3%
Boonville	Mendocino	997	68.3%	30.8%	0.0%	0.0%	0.9%	56.1%
Bootjack	Mariposa	951	85.0%	13.6%	1.5%	0.0%	0.0%	0.0%
Boron	Kern	2,323	84.1%	5.4%	0.0%	10.2%	0.3%	14.9%
Boronda	Monterey	1,606	58.0%	31.2%	9.9%	0.0%	0.9%	82.6%
Borrego Springs	San Diego	2,427	71.2%	25.3%	2.6%	0.0%	0.9%	43.3%
Bostonia	San Diego	13,705	85.3%	6.0%	2.3%	5.3%	1.0%	28.6%
Boulder Creek	Santa Cruz	5,337	93.1%	5.3%	1.6%	0.0%	0.0%	4.0%
Boulevard	San Diego	23	100.0%	0.0%	0.0%	0.0%	0.0%	17.4%
Bowles	Fresno	105	63.8%	32.4%	0.0%	1.9%	1.9%	41.0%
Boyes Hot Springs	Sonoma	7,284	74.8%	20.8%	3.4%	0.0%	1.1%	52.7%
Bradbury	Los Angeles	932	64.5%	2.3%	32.9%	0.0%	0.3%	11.6%
Bradley	Monterey	75	74.7%	20.0%	0.0%	5.3%	0.0%	2.7%
Brawley	Imperial	24,645	78.0%	16.2%	0.9%	4.2%	0.7%	80.1%
Brea	Orange	38,837	71.0%	10.1%	17.5%	1.0%	0.5%	23.6%
Brentwood	Contra Costa	48,582	73.7%	13.1%	6.7%	5.5%	1.0%	28.6%
Bret Harte	Stanislaus	4,916	62.7%	30.7%	1.4%	2.2%	3.1%	82.2%
Bridgeport	Mono	456	82.7%	1.8%	0.0%	2.6%	12.9%	5.3%
Brisbane	San Mateo	4,179	57.9%	13.0%	25.6%	1.0%	2.5%	25.1%
Broadmoor	San Mateo	4,229	45.1%	14.9%	38.0%	1.0%	0.9%	22.5%
Brookdale	Santa Cruz	1,723	98.3%	0.6%	1.0%	0.0%	0.0%	14.3%
Brooktrails	Mendocino	3,280	91.8%	2.9%	2.7%	0.0%	2.7%	3.8%
Buckhorn	Amador	2,090	98.4%	1.6%	0.0%	0.0%	0.0%	5.6%
Buck Meadows	Mariposa	31	74.2%	9.7%	0.0%	16.1%	0.0%	0.0%
Bucks Lake	Plumas	18	100.0%	0.0%	0.0%	0.0%	0.0%	0.0%
Buellton	Santa Barbara	4,712	69.9%	23.0%	4.2%	0.4%	2.5%	38.9%
Buena Park	Orange	80,214	53.4%	14.9%	26.1%	4.5%	1.1%	37.7%
Buena Vista	Amador	435	68.5%	25.1%	0.0%	0.0%	6.4%	0.0%
Burbank	Los Angeles	103,037	74.2%	12.0%	11.5%	2.0%	0.3%	25.5%
Burbank	Santa Clara	5,827	67.3%	19.2%	11.6%	1.5%	0.3%	48.5%
Burlingame	San Mateo	28,514	70.9%	6.8%	20.2%	1.4%	0.7%	11.9%
Burney	Shasta	2,824	91.5%	3.0%	0.2%	0.0%	5.2%	3.5%
Burnt Ranch	Trinity	293	92.8%	6.1%	0.0%	0.0%	1.0%	2.0%
Butte Creek Canyon	Butte	924	96.6%	2.4%	0.6%	0.0%	0.3%	3.6%
Butte Meadows	Butte	21	100.0%	0.0%	0.0%	0.0%	0.0%	0.0%
Butte Valley	Butte	954	100.0%	0.0%	0.0%	0.0%	0.0%	10.5%
Buttonwillow	Kern	1,449	76.3%	20.9%	0.1%	2.6%	0.0%	76.6%
Byron	Contra Costa	1,287	84.8%	10.4%	0.4%	4.4%	0.0%	13.8%
Bystrom	Stanislaus	3,858	73.8%	20.1%	5.8%	0.3%	0.0%	79.7%
Cabazon	Riverside	1,729	87.9%	7.6%	0.0%	3.5%	0.9%	40.8%
Calabasas	Los Angeles	22,839	81.6%	5.1%	10.1%	3.1%	0.2%	6.6%
Calexico	Imperial	37,378	64.4%	34.1%	1.0%	0.2%	0.3%	96.4%
California City	Kern	13,684	64.8%	15.9%	2.7%	16.4%	0.2%	24.4%
California Hot Springs	Tulare	67	98.5%	1.5%	0.0%	0.0%	0.0%	0.0%
California Pines	Modoc	105	81.0%	19.0%	0.0%	0.0%	0.0%	3.8%
Calimesa	Riverside	7,923	91.0%	7.6%	1.0%	0.5%	0.0%	19.5%
Calipatria	Imperial	7,292	66.8%	21.1%	1.5%	9.0%	1.7%	75.5%
Calistoga	Napa	5,159	93.3%	4.7%	0.9%	1.0%	0.0%	38.2%
Callender	San Luis Obispo	1,531	96.3%	2.2%	1.6%	0.0%	0.0%	42.5%
Calpella	Mendocino	890	79.8%	9.3%	2.7%	5.1%	3.1%	6.7%
Calpine	Sierra	194	100.0%	0.0%	0.0%	0.0%	0.0%	0.0%
Calwa	Fresno	1,467	49.5%	44.4%	6.1%	0.0%	0.0%	83.0%
Camanche North Shore	Amador	791	96.7%	3.3%	0.0%	0.0%	0.0%	16.9%
Camanche Village	Amador	704	100.0%	0.0%	0.0%	0.0%	0.0%	0.0%
Camarillo	Ventura	64,340	73.0%	13.8%	10.7%	1.4%	1.0%	24.5%
Cambria	San Luis Obispo	6,229	91.7%	4.3%	2.7%	0.0%	1.3%	17.1%
Cambrian Park	Santa Clara	3,581	78.6%	9.0%	3.9%	0.3%	8.2%	16.8%
Cameron Park	El Dorado	16,697	90.8%	6.1%	2.2%	0.6%	0.4%	15.4%
Camino	El Dorado	1,933	98.7%	0.7%	0.3%	0.4%	0.0%	3.5%
Camino Tassajara	Contra Costa	1,813	51.9%	2.5%	45.6%	0.0%	0.0%	8.3%
Campbell	Santa Clara	39,108	68.7%	12.0%	16.9%	1.4%	0.9%	16.8%
Camp Nelson	Tulare	119	100.0%	0.0%	0.0%	0.0%	0.0%	0.0%
Campo	San Diego	2,482	80.3%	4.4%	2.6%	9.5%	3.2%	33.0%
Camp Pendleton North	San Diego	6,948	65.7%	14.8%	4.3%	11.1%	4.1%	24.3%
Camp Pendleton South	San Diego	11,193	61.0%	23.4%	3.5%	11.8%	0.3%	25.4%
Camptonville	Yuba	139	97.1%	2.9%	0.0%	0.0%	0.0%	9.4%
Canby	Modoc	480	62.3%	19.4%	0.0%	10.4%	7.9%	20.8%
Cantua Creek	Fresno	289	89.6%	10.4%	0.0%	0.0%	0.0%	100.0%
Canyondam	Plumas	0	0.0%	0.0%	0.0%	0.0%	0.0%	0.0%
Canyon Lake	Riverside	10,663	92.9%	4.8%	1.1%	0.9%	0.3%	9.7%
Capitola	Santa Cruz	9,864	85.9%	9.6%	2.3%	1.1%	1.1%	22.3%
Caribou	Plumas	0	0.0%	0.0%	0.0%	0.0%	0.0%	0.0%
Carlsbad	San Diego	102,342	86.0%	5.7%	7.4%	0.6%	0.3%	13.4%
Carmel-by-the-Sea	Monterey	3,728	90.0%	3.6%	6.4%	0.0%	0.0%	8.1%
Carmel Valley Village	Monterey	4,676	88.6%	9.2%	2.2%	0.0%	0.0%	6.8%
Carmet	Sonoma	22	100.0%	0.0%	0.0%	0.0%	0.0%	0.0%
Carmichael	Sacramento	61,710	82.0%	7.2%	5.1%	4.4%	1.3%	10.6%
Carnelian Bay	Placer	289	100.0%	0.0%	0.0%	0.0%	0.0%	0.0%
Carpinteria	Santa Barbara	13,106	73.0%	21.9%	3.4%	0.4%	1.4%	42.6%
Carrick	Siskiyou	123	100.0%	0.0%	0.0%	0.0%	0.0%	0.0%
Carson	Los Angeles	91,508	31.6%	16.7%	26.0%	22.3%	3.4%	37.8%
Cartago	Inyo	84	100.0%	0.0%	0.0%	0.0%	0.0%	0.0%
Caruthers	Fresno	2,914	53.4%	39.5%	1.6%	3.2%	2.3%	78.3%
Casa Conejo	Ventura	3,424	89.0%	4.6%	2.1%	4.3%	0.0%	32.6%
Casa de Oro-Mount Helix	San Diego	18,498	84.2%	4.4%	3.0%	7.8%	0.7%	17.1%
Casmalia	Santa Barbara	224	100.0%	0.0%	0.0%	0.0%	0.0%	95.1%
Caspar	Mendocino	637	97.2%	2.8%	0.0%	0.0%	0.0%	0.2%
Cassel	Shasta	473	100.0%	0.0%	0.0%	0.0%	0.0%	4.7%
Castaic	Los Angeles	18,170	72.6%	15.4%	6.5%	5.2%	0.3%	24.3%
Castle Hill	Contra Costa	1,369	89.5%	6.6%	3.9%	0.0%	0.0%	8.2%
Castro Valley	Alameda	60,882	62.9%	7.9%	21.7%	6.8%	0.8%	17.4%
Castroville	Monterey	5,809	61.9%	31.0%	2.5%	0.0%	4.6%	94.5%
Cathedral City	Riverside	51,130	80.7%	13.0%	3.8%	1.8%	0.8%	59.8%
Catheys Valley	Mariposa	811	83.5%	16.5%	0.0%	0.0%	0.0%	11.6%
Cayucos	San Luis Obispo	2,822	97.5%	1.8%	0.5%	0.0%	0.2%	6.0%
Cazadero	Sonoma	305	92.8%	7.2%	0.0%	0.0%	0.0%	8.9%
Cedar Ridge	Tuolumne	1,071	89.8%	6.9%	0.7%	0.3%	2.3%	3.5%
Cedar Slope	Tulare	0	0.0%	0.0%	0.0%	0.0%	0.0%	0.0%
Cedarville	Modoc	545	85.3%	12.8%	0.4%	0.0%	1.5%	20.2%
Centerville	Fresno	231	93.9%	0.0%	0.0%	6.1%	0.0%	0.0%
Ceres	Stanislaus	44,731	70.9%	18.2%	7.1%	2.0%	1.7%	54.8%
Cerritos	Los Angeles	49,281	21.3%	9.0%	62.2%	6.8%	0.8%	11.4%
Chalfant	Mono	749	100.0%	0.0%	0.0%	0.0%	0.0%	1.3%
Challenge-Brownsville	Yuba	1,479	81.9%	10.0%	0.0%	3.4%	4.7%	8.2%
Channel Islands Beach	Ventura	3,299	94.0%	4.8%	1.2%	0.0%	0.0%	19.2%
Charter Oak	Los Angeles	9,747	62.9%	28.8%	5.5%	2.2%	0.5%	46.6%
Cherokee	Butte	105	86.7%	0.0%	13.3%	0.0%	0.0%	0.0%
Cherokee Strip	Kern	316	86.4%	13.6%	0.0%	0.0%	0.0%	78.5%
Cherryland	Alameda	14,394	46.8%	31.1%	9.0%	8.6%	4.5%	55.9%
Cherry Valley	Riverside	5,477	91.4%	4.7%	3.0%	0.7%	0.3%	15.2%
Chester	Plumas	1,674	97.6%	2.2%	0.0%	0.2%	0.0%	2.9%
Chico	Butte	85,605	82.0%	10.2%	4.6%	1.9%	1.2%	14.8%
Chilcoot-Vinton	Plumas	534	100.0%	0.0%	0.0%	0.0%	0.0%	0.0%
China Lake Acres	Kern	1,423	82.4%	13.3%	0.0%	0.0%	4.4%	10.3%
Chinese Camp	Tuolumne	154	90.9%	9.1%	0.0%	0.0%	0.0%	8.4%
Chino	San Bernardino	78,050	60.8%	22.2%	9.8%	6.4%	0.9%	54.3%
Chino Hills	San Bernardino	74,765	55.6%	11.8%	28.3%	3.8%	0.5%	30.2%
Chowchilla	Madera	18,465	68.1%	14.3%	2.5%	10.2%	5.0%	36.7%
Chualar	Monterey	1,182	83.0%	13.4%	1.6%	0.9%	1.1%	92.0%
Chula Vista	San Diego	236,218	64.5%	15.4%	14.3%	4.5%	1.3%	56.8%
Citrus	Los Angeles	10,441	43.3%	44.6%	7.4%	1.5%	3.1%	69.5%
Citrus Heights	Sacramento	84,112	82.2%	10.5%	2.7%	3.0%	1.6%	16.5%
Claremont	Los Angeles	34,824	72.1%	11.0%	11.0%	5.1%	0.8%	20.8%
Clarksburg	Yolo	423	87.0%	0.0%	0.0%	0.0%	13.0%	13.9%
Clay	Sacramento	1,188	68.5%	25.3%	6.2%	0.0%	0.0%	24.4%
Clayton	Contra Costa	10,856	85.3%	4.6%	7.6%	2.2%	0.3%	8.2%
Clear Creek	Lassen	138	96.4%	3.6%	0.0%	0.0%	0.0%	15.2%
Clearlake	Lake	15,134	76.9%	14.2%	1.0%	5.4%	2.5%	23.9%
Clearlake Oaks	Lake	1,291	85.8%	2.8%	0.0%	5.0%	6.4%	0.8%
Clearlake Riviera	Lake	2,850	96.3%	0.8%	0.0%	2.2%	0.7%	12.7%
Cleone	Mendocino	736	100.0%	0.0%	0.0%	0.0%	0.0%	20.5%
Clio	Plumas	41	46.3%	53.7%	0.0%	0.0%	0.0%	53.7%
Clipper Mills	Butte	91	100.0%	0.0%	0.0%	0.0%	0.0%	0.0%
Cloverdale	Sonoma	8,390	81.1%	13.6%	4.6%	0.2%	0.5%	30.2%
Clovis	Fresno	93,304	69.2%	16.5%	9.8%	3.1%	1.4%	24.2%
Clyde	Contra Costa	529	78.8%	9.8%	11.3%	0.0%	0.0%	37.4%
Coachella	Riverside	39,442	63.5%	34.8%	0.1%	1.3%	0.4%	96.6%
Coalinga	Fresno	13,246	66.6%	22.1%	1.9%	7.3%	2.1%	52.0%
Coarsegold	Madera	1,490	98.2%	1.8%	0.0%	0.0%	0.0%	4.9%
Cobb	Lake	1,810	92.6%	3.6%	3.8%	0.0%	0.0%	5.2%
Coffee Creek	Trinity	219	96.3%	3.7%	0.0%	0.0%	0.0%	3.7%
Cohasset	Butte	955	98.4%	1.0%	0.0%	0.5%	0.0%	3.0%
Cold Springs (El Dorado County)	El Dorado	569	90.9%	9.1%	0.0%	0.0%	0.0%	3.3%
Cold Springs (Tuolumne County)	Tuolumne	293	94.2%	5.8%	0.0%	0.0%	0.0%	6.5%
Coleville	Mono	652	89.0%	7.7%	0.0%	3.4%	0.0%	38.3%
Colfax	Placer	1,999	92.1%	5.0%	2.7%	0.1%	0.2%	4.1%
College City	Colusa	70	100.0%	0.0%	0.0%	0.0%	0.0%	35.7%
Collierville	San Joaquin	1,891	81.8%	17.1%	0.0%	1.2%	0.0%	23.1%
Colma	San Mateo	1,785	32.2%	21.8%	44.0%	1.3%	0.7%	40.0%
Coloma	El Dorado	353	82.4%	17.3%	0.3%	0.0%	0.0%	20.1%
Colton	San Bernardino	52,283	50.2%	32.5%	5.2%	10.4%	1.6%	68.0%
Columbia	Tuolumne	2,258	74.1%	20.8%	0.1%	0.0%	5.0%	11.3%
Colusa	Colusa	5,951	62.2%	32.2%	1.9%	0.9%	2.8%	56.4%
Commerce	Los Angeles	12,791	60.3%	34.9%	1.5%	2.1%	1.2%	94.5%
Comptche	Mendocino	133	100.0%	0.0%	0.0%	0.0%	0.0%	33.1%
Compton	Los Angeles	96,102	38.2%	29.1%	0.3%	31.2%	1.1%	65.5%
Concord	Contra Costa	121,989	69.2%	15.0%	11.8%	3.1%	1.0%	27.9%
Concow	Butte	581	78.0%	12.4%	2.4%	3.8%	3.4%	1.0%
Contra Costa Centre	Contra Costa	5,773	69.2%	8.2%	20.6%	2.0%	0.0%	10.3%
Copperopolis	Calaveras	4,177	93.0%	3.4%	0.7%	2.9%	0.0%	3.6%
Corcoran	Kings	25,113	59.8%	23.8%	2.0%	12.2%	2.3%	63.0%
Corning	Tehama	7,624	77.7%	18.3%	1.4%	0.0%	2.6%	42.0%
Corona	Riverside	152,111	65.8%	17.4%	9.2%	5.7%	1.9%	42.8%
Coronado	San Diego	19,423	89.4%	5.2%	2.8%	2.0%	0.6%	14.5%
Coronita	Riverside	3,117	58.9%	35.6%	3.1%	2.4%	0.0%	54.5%
Corralitos	Santa Cruz	2,439	83.8%	14.4%	1.0%	0.8%	0.0%	24.4%
Corte Madera	Marin	9,191	82.5%	3.7%	12.6%	1.2%	0.0%	3.7%
Costa Mesa	Orange	109,796	70.6%	18.4%	8.7%	1.3%	1.0%	34.7%
Cotati	Sonoma	7,154	87.9%	6.2%	4.4%	1.2%	0.2%	10.5%
Coto de Caza	Orange	14,974	87.7%	4.8%	5.9%	1.5%	0.0%	6.1%
Cottonwood	Shasta	3,426	81.8%	14.7%	0.0%	0.4%	3.1%	18.9%
Coulterville	Mariposa	190	100.0%	0.0%	0.0%	0.0%	0.0%	7.4%
Country Club	San Joaquin	9,311	67.0%	20.7%	4.7%	6.4%	1.1%	36.4%
Courtland	Sacramento	484	52.5%	44.6%	2.9%	0.0%	0.0%	80.8%
Covelo	Mendocino	1,473	60.8%	0.2%	3.4%	0.5%	35.1%	11.3%
Covina	Los Angeles	47,662	53.2%	30.7%	10.1%	5.0%	0.9%	51.7%
Cowan	Stanislaus	302	75.8%	11.6%	0.0%	0.0%	12.6%	25.5%
Crescent City	Del Norte	7,673	54.0%	26.9%	3.9%	9.9%	5.3%	27.7%
Crescent Mills	Plumas	188	54.3%	45.7%	0.0%	0.0%	0.0%	45.7%
Cressey	Merced	614	57.0%	42.3%	0.7%	0.0%	0.0%	63.7%
Crest	San Diego	2,138	96.9%	1.6%	0.8%	0.0%	0.7%	11.6%
Crestline	San Bernardino	8,743	87.5%	9.7%	0.8%	1.2%	0.8%	14.2%
Crestmore Heights	Riverside	665	100.0%	0.0%	0.0%	0.0%	0.0%	82.1%
Creston	San Luis Obispo	94	79.8%	20.2%	0.0%	0.0%	0.0%	0.0%
C-Road	Plumas	126	100.0%	0.0%	0.0%	0.0%	0.0%	0.0%
Crockett	Contra Costa	2,921	85.6%	7.6%	4.9%	1.0%	0.9%	11.7%
Cromberg	Plumas	130	100.0%	0.0%	0.0%	0.0%	0.0%	0.0%
Crowley Lake	Mono	496	100.0%	0.0%	0.0%	0.0%	0.0%	8.9%
Crows Landing	Stanislaus	425	37.2%	0.0%	0.0%	0.0%	62.8%	75.5%
Cudahy	Los Angeles	23,846	61.9%	36.7%	0.5%	0.8%	0.1%	96.7%
Culver City	Los Angeles	38,899	60.3%	13.5%	14.7%	11.2%	0.3%	23.4%
Cupertino	Santa Clara	57,459	34.6%	3.9%	60.7%	0.4%	0.4%	4.3%
Cutler	Tulare	4,312	80.6%	17.6%	1.9%	0.0%	0.0%	97.4%
Cutten	Humboldt	3,166	89.5%	2.7%	4.5%	0.0%	3.3%	0.6%
Cuyama	Santa Barbara	88	100.0%	0.0%	0.0%	0.0%	0.0%	50.0%
Cypress	Orange	47,610	58.5%	7.5%	31.1%	2.1%	0.7%	18.1%
Daly City	San Mateo	100,556	27.0%	13.4%	55.0%	3.0%	1.6%	24.2%
Dana Point	Orange	33,510	89.4%	7.1%	2.8%	0.4%	0.3%	15.3%
Danville	Contra Costa	41,994	81.7%	5.7%	11.6%	0.8%	0.1%	5.9%
Daphnedale Park	Modoc	35	100.0%	0.0%	0.0%	0.0%	0.0%	0.0%
Darwin	Inyo	32	100.0%	0.0%	0.0%	0.0%	0.0%	0.0%
Davenport	Santa Cruz	271	90.0%	7.0%	1.1%	1.8%	0.0%	25.8%
Davis	Yolo	65,359	63.8%	11.1%	22.0%	1.9%	1.2%	13.5%
Day Valley	Santa Cruz	3,662	89.5%	8.7%	0.9%	0.0%	1.0%	11.6%
Deer Park	Napa	1,047	92.0%	2.8%	5.3%	0.0%	0.0%	3.5%
Del Aire	Los Angeles	9,791	66.7%	15.0%	14.2%	3.8%	0.3%	44.6%
Delano	Kern	52,342	62.8%	16.8%	13.4%	5.8%	1.2%	72.6%
Delft Colony	Tulare	492	61.6%	38.4%	0.0%	0.0%	0.0%	93.1%
Delhi	Merced	9,892	59.0%	28.9%	7.1%	2.2%	2.8%	67.8%
Delleker	Plumas	672	89.3%	5.4%	0.0%	1.3%	4.0%	19.6%
Del Mar	San Diego	4,175	93.8%	4.1%	2.0%	0.0%	0.0%	4.0%
Del Monte Forest	Monterey	4,312	82.1%	1.9%	15.2%	0.0%	0.7%	2.7%
Del Rey	Fresno	1,625	33.0%	64.5%	0.0%	0.0%	2.5%	100.0%
Del Rey Oaks	Monterey	1,734	87.1%	8.2%	3.4%	1.3%	0.0%	16.3%
Del Rio	Stanislaus	1,071	94.3%	0.0%	5.7%	0.0%	0.0%	8.2%
Denair	Stanislaus	4,529	87.3%	11.3%	1.2%	0.0%	0.2%	37.7%
Derby Acres	Kern	360	90.8%	5.0%	0.0%	0.0%	4.2%	5.0%
Descanso	San Diego	1,310	93.1%	0.9%	4.7%	0.8%	0.5%	4.8%
Desert Center	Riverside	150	83.3%	16.0%	0.0%	0.7%	0.0%	26.7%
Desert Edge	Riverside	4,223	87.7%	11.4%	0.8%	0.0%	0.0%	17.5%
Desert Hot Springs	Riverside	25,793	54.1%	33.3%	1.6%	8.2%	2.8%	51.4%
Desert Palms	Riverside	6,592	95.7%	1.4%	2.2%	0.2%	0.5%	3.1%
Desert Shores	Imperial	852	94.4%	5.6%	0.0%	0.0%	0.0%	86.3%
Desert View Highlands	Los Angeles	2,431	43.8%	51.9%	0.0%	3.5%	0.8%	61.1%
Diablo	Contra Costa	1,083	70.0%	16.6%	11.0%	0.0%	2.4%	0.0%
Diablo Grande	Stanislaus	551	78.4%	11.8%	2.2%	7.6%	0.0%	29.0%
Diamond Bar	Los Angeles	55,668	34.9%	8.5%	53.0%	3.5%	0.2%	19.3%
Diamond Springs	El Dorado	11,367	93.6%	2.3%	1.3%	0.7%	2.1%	9.4%
Dillon Beach	Marin	132	100.0%	0.0%	0.0%	0.0%	0.0%	0.0%
Dinuba	Tulare	21,163	70.7%	26.6%	1.9%	0.0%	0.8%	85.8%
Discovery Bay	Contra Costa	12,506	86.2%	5.1%	2.0%	5.7%	1.0%	10.1%
Dixon	Solano	18,141	74.9%	17.0%	3.8%	3.0%	1.3%	39.4%
Dixon Lane-Meadow Creek	Inyo	2,800	86.1%	11.3%	0.0%	0.0%	2.5%	23.0%
Dobbins	Yuba	280	66.8%	33.2%	0.0%	0.0%	0.0%	42.1%
Dogtown	San Joaquin	2,407	91.4%	7.1%	1.5%	0.0%	0.0%	32.4%
Dollar Point	Placer	1,091	98.4%	1.6%	0.0%	0.1%	0.0%	8.9%
Dorrington	Calaveras	466	88.4%	11.6%	0.0%	0.0%	0.0%	16.7%
Dorris	Siskiyou	872	83.9%	11.6%	1.0%	0.0%	3.4%	25.1%
Dos Palos	Merced	4,940	79.6%	18.1%	0.0%	2.0%	0.3%	66.5%
Dos Palos Y	Merced	207	77.3%	22.7%	0.0%	0.0%	0.0%	65.2%
Douglas City	Trinity	647	87.6%	10.7%	1.4%	0.0%	0.3%	5.6%
Downey	Los Angeles	111,329	55.6%	33.5%	6.9%	3.7%	0.3%	70.9%
Downieville	Sierra	192	100.0%	0.0%	0.0%	0.0%	0.0%	0.0%
Doyle	Lassen	367	96.5%	3.5%	0.0%	0.0%	0.0%	0.8%
Drytown	Amador	138	100.0%	0.0%	0.0%	0.0%	0.0%	0.0%
Duarte	Los Angeles	21,363	51.1%	24.9%	16.1%	7.5%	0.4%	46.1%
Dublin	Alameda	44,171	57.5%	8.7%	26.2%	6.9%	0.7%	12.9%
Ducor	Tulare	454	66.1%	33.9%	0.0%	0.0%	0.0%	65.4%
Dunnigan	Yolo	1,043	68.6%	9.7%	8.5%	13.1%	0.0%	21.4%
Dunsmuir	Siskiyou	1,663	85.9%	8.5%	1.5%	1.6%	2.4%	7.5%
Durham	Butte	5,829	91.8%	2.6%	3.8%	0.2%	1.5%	11.6%
Dustin Acres	Kern	590	73.4%	26.6%	0.0%	0.0%	0.0%	26.9%
Dutch Flat	Placer	114	100.0%	0.0%	0.0%	0.0%	0.0%	3.5%
Eagleville	Modoc	53	86.8%	0.0%	0.0%	0.0%	13.2%	0.0%
Earlimart	Tulare	7,225	84.2%	13.6%	2.0%	0.0%	0.1%	96.4%
East Foothills	Santa Clara	6,983	67.3%	17.4%	13.4%	1.9%	0.1%	31.4%
East Hemet	Riverside	18,334	74.4%	18.7%	2.2%	2.8%	1.8%	36.4%
East La Mirada	Los Angeles	10,195	68.9%	27.5%	3.0%	0.1%	0.5%	51.6%
East Los Angeles	Los Angeles	124,222	57.3%	40.8%	0.7%	0.4%	0.8%	97.8%
East Nicolaus	Sutter	301	36.9%	46.5%	16.6%	0.0%	0.0%	46.5%
East Oakdale	Stanislaus	3,118	96.5%	2.3%	0.9%	0.0%	0.3%	13.5%
Easton	Fresno	1,994	56.4%	37.7%	2.3%	1.5%	2.2%	57.6%
East Orosi	Tulare	231	59.7%	40.3%	0.0%	0.0%	0.0%	100.0%
East Palo Alto	San Mateo	28,077	54.3%	15.5%	3.0%	17.5%	9.8%	62.1%
East Pasadena	Los Angeles	5,774	61.6%	13.9%	22.0%	1.0%	1.4%	34.6%
East Porterville	Tulare	6,585	78.1%	18.3%	2.3%	0.1%	1.2%	75.4%
East Quincy	Plumas	2,847	92.9%	1.8%	0.0%	3.1%	2.3%	2.6%
East Rancho Dominguez	Los Angeles	13,891	53.4%	29.5%	0.8%	15.8%	0.6%	80.7%
East Richmond Heights	Contra Costa	3,157	66.0%	4.6%	9.8%	18.9%	0.7%	7.9%
East San Gabriel	Los Angeles	15,453	35.5%	14.3%	49.0%	0.5%	0.7%	23.7%
East Shore	Plumas	246	76.0%	0.0%	24.0%	0.0%	0.0%	0.0%
East Sonora	Tuolumne	2,050	89.6%	5.6%	1.0%	0.0%	3.9%	7.9%
East Tulare Villa	Tulare	1,004	81.6%	13.1%	4.7%	0.6%	0.0%	70.6%
Eastvale	Riverside	53,437	48.8%	17.4%	21.9%	10.9%	1.1%	40.1%
Edgewood	Siskiyou	49	85.7%	14.3%	0.0%	0.0%	0.0%	14.3%
Edmundson Acres	Kern	306	43.8%	49.3%	0.0%	3.9%	2.9%	84.0%
Edna	San Luis Obispo	80	100.0%	0.0%	0.0%	0.0%	0.0%	0.0%
Edwards AFB	Kern	2,373	68.2%	8.2%	6.1%	16.8%	0.7%	17.9%
El Cajon	San Diego	98,813	77.4%	11.9%	4.2%	5.0%	1.5%	31.6%
El Centro	Imperial	42,141	65.1%	28.6%	2.6%	3.1%	0.7%	79.6%
El Cerrito	Contra Costa	23,482	58.3%	9.3%	24.9%	7.2%	0.3%	12.0%
El Cerrito	Riverside	5,059	75.0%	23.2%	0.8%	1.0%	0.0%	52.5%
El Dorado Hills	El Dorado	43,563	84.0%	5.4%	8.9%	1.7%	0.1%	7.3%
Eldridge	Sonoma	1,899	74.6%	22.9%	1.8%	0.5%	0.2%	19.0%
El Granada	San Mateo	4,683	91.5%	6.2%	2.0%	0.3%	0.0%	9.3%
Elizabeth Lake	Los Angeles	1,462	93.1%	3.7%	1.4%	1.8%	0.0%	10.0%
Elk Creek	Glenn	89	93.3%	3.4%	0.0%	0.0%	3.4%	3.4%
Elk Grove	Sacramento	146,537	44.3%	17.3%	25.2%	11.1%	2.1%	19.4%
Elkhorn	Monterey	1,828	90.9%	7.1%	2.0%	0.0%	0.0%	30.1%
Elmira	Solano	251	97.2%	2.8%	0.0%	0.0%	0.0%	2.8%
El Monte	Los Angeles	113,763	38.8%	34.5%	25.1%	0.8%	0.8%	68.5%
El Nido	Merced	297	44.1%	55.9%	0.0%	0.0%	0.0%	72.4%
El Paso de Robles (Paso Robles)	San Luis Obispo	29,270	76.6%	15.1%	2.0%	4.5%	1.8%	35.1%
El Portal	Mariposa	509	72.5%	7.1%	6.1%	7.3%	7.1%	19.4%
El Rancho	Tulare	41	100.0%	0.0%	0.0%	0.0%	0.0%	100.0%
El Rio	Ventura	6,014	60.2%	35.9%	1.6%	1.5%	0.9%	79.5%
El Segundo	Los Angeles	16,597	83.0%	8.3%	6.3%	0.7%	1.8%	19.3%
El Sobrante (Contra Costa County)	Contra Costa	13,823	62.6%	11.0%	14.6%	11.4%	0.5%	23.4%
El Sobrante (Riverside County)	Riverside	12,617	57.9%	16.4%	17.2%	8.6%	0.0%	21.3%
El Verano	Sonoma	3,555	80.6%	13.3%	5.5%	0.0%	0.5%	28.2%
Elverta	Sacramento	5,203	83.0%	8.6%	5.0%	1.1%	2.3%	10.4%
Emerald Lake Hills	San Mateo	4,273	86.3%	1.8%	10.9%	1.0%	0.0%	4.6%
Emeryville	Alameda	9,698	44.1%	5.7%	36.3%	13.8%	0.2%	8.8%
Empire	Stanislaus	4,071	84.6%	14.9%	0.3%	0.0%	0.1%	54.7%
Encinitas	San Diego	59,223	88.7%	5.6%	4.4%	0.5%	0.8%	14.4%
Escalon	San Joaquin	7,106	90.8%	5.0%	1.6%	0.8%	1.8%	21.4%
Escondido	San Diego	142,573	79.9%	11.6%	5.8%	1.8%	1.0%	47.6%
Esparto	Yolo	2,877	62.8%	35.2%	2.0%	0.0%	0.0%	55.3%
Etna	Siskiyou	721	86.8%	10.1%	0.6%	0.0%	2.5%	9.3%
Eucalyptus Hills	San Diego	5,776	79.2%	10.7%	1.9%	6.2%	2.0%	16.0%
Eureka	Humboldt	27,027	82.3%	6.6%	3.9%	1.8%	5.4%	9.3%
Exeter	Tulare	10,255	86.4%	11.0%	0.0%	1.6%	1.0%	45.8%
Fairbanks Ranch	San Diego	2,164	94.8%	3.2%	1.9%	0.0%	0.0%	4.3%
Fairfax	Marin	7,410	91.7%	6.6%	0.9%	0.8%	0.0%	6.4%
Fairfield	Solano	104,404	47.1%	19.4%	15.5%	16.6%	1.5%	25.7%
Fairmead	Madera	1,042	77.7%	17.9%	0.8%	3.6%	0.0%	53.3%
Fair Oaks	Sacramento	30,297	86.9%	5.9%	5.2%	1.5%	0.5%	9.3%
Fairview	Alameda	9,597	49.2%	13.5%	18.1%	17.7%	1.5%	18.5%
Fallbrook	San Diego	30,949	74.9%	20.7%	1.5%	2.0%	0.8%	43.7%
Fall River Mills	Shasta	572	76.9%	21.2%	1.9%	0.0%	0.0%	35.1%
Farmersville	Tulare	10,445	83.2%	15.3%	0.4%	0.0%	1.1%	81.7%
Farmington	San Joaquin	299	75.9%	14.0%	0.0%	10.0%	0.0%	0.0%
Fellows	Kern	118	89.8%	4.2%	0.0%	0.0%	5.9%	4.2%
Felton	Santa Cruz	4,534	88.9%	1.9%	4.9%	1.4%	2.9%	3.4%
Ferndale	Humboldt	1,503	92.0%	5.6%	0.2%	0.0%	2.2%	2.5%
Fetters Hot Springs-Agua Caliente	Sonoma	4,034	88.7%	7.1%	2.9%	0.7%	0.6%	41.2%
Fiddletown	Amador	121	100.0%	0.0%	0.0%	0.0%	0.0%	0.0%
Fieldbrook	Humboldt	1,053	83.1%	11.4%	0.9%	1.4%	3.2%	4.8%
Fields Landing	Humboldt	195	100.0%	0.0%	0.0%	0.0%	0.0%	0.0%
Fillmore	Ventura	14,863	60.4%	35.0%	3.2%	0.6%	0.9%	74.8%
Firebaugh	Fresno	7,474	78.9%	20.2%	0.1%	0.7%	0.0%	89.9%
Fish Camp	Mariposa	53	41.5%	0.0%	0.0%	0.0%	58.5%	0.0%
Florence-Graham	Los Angeles	61,333	74.6%	15.8%	0.1%	9.0%	0.6%	90.1%
Florin	Sacramento	49,869	42.9%	13.2%	26.4%	14.4%	3.1%	30.8%
Floriston	Nevada	35	100.0%	0.0%	0.0%	0.0%	0.0%	0.0%
Flournoy	Tehama	115	99.1%	0.9%	0.0%	0.0%	0.0%	29.6%
Folsom	Sacramento	70,564	71.6%	7.3%	13.4%	6.7%	1.1%	11.4%
Fontana	San Bernardino	192,779	58.2%	24.8%	6.4%	9.7%	0.9%	65.9%
Foothill Farms	Sacramento	32,798	68.1%	15.1%	5.0%	10.7%	1.1%	21.6%
Forbestown	Butte	291	72.9%	24.7%	0.0%	0.0%	2.4%	10.0%
Ford City	Kern	4,013	70.9%	27.3%	0.5%	0.0%	1.3%	41.5%
Foresthill	Placer	1,823	84.5%	7.2%	2.1%	0.0%	6.1%	0.6%
Forest Meadows	Calaveras	1,546	100.0%	0.0%	0.0%	0.0%	0.0%	0.0%
Forest Ranch	Butte	1,294	93.9%	6.1%	0.0%	0.0%	0.0%	0.5%
Forestville	Sonoma	3,268	86.6%	10.0%	3.1%	0.0%	0.2%	10.7%
Fort Bidwell	Modoc	151	39.1%	1.3%	2.0%	0.0%	57.6%	1.3%
Fort Bragg	Mendocino	7,211	82.2%	12.8%	0.9%	0.5%	3.6%	33.1%
Fort Irwin	San Bernardino	9,781	69.4%	10.1%	7.1%	10.2%	3.2%	25.5%
Fort Jones	Siskiyou	595	91.8%	3.2%	0.2%	2.4%	2.5%	6.6%
Fortuna	Humboldt	11,753	80.8%	13.2%	2.7%	1.1%	2.3%	12.5%
Fort Washington	Fresno	406	86.2%	13.8%	0.0%	0.0%	0.0%	0.0%
Foster City	San Mateo	30,133	46.1%	6.1%	45.2%	2.0%	0.7%	6.4%
Fountain Valley	Orange	55,209	55.9%	7.1%	35.1%	1.4%	0.5%	12.6%
Fowler	Fresno	5,434	47.6%	38.5%	11.3%	2.2%	0.4%	63.9%
Franklin (Merced County)	Merced	5,766	71.4%	14.8%	6.6%	2.5%	4.7%	56.4%
Franklin (Sacramento County)	Sacramento	0	0.0%	0.0%	0.0%	0.0%	0.0%	0.0%
Frazier Park	Kern	2,467	91.9%	7.0%	0.0%	0.0%	1.1%	13.5%
Freedom	Santa Cruz	3,078	51.5%	43.9%	4.1%	0.0%	0.5%	66.4%
Freeport	Sacramento	23	100.0%	0.0%	0.0%	0.0%	0.0%	0.0%
Fremont	Alameda	211,748	33.9%	12.8%	49.0%	3.3%	1.1%	15.4%
French Camp	San Joaquin	4,702	70.8%	15.8%	2.2%	10.1%	1.1%	55.4%
French Gulch	Shasta	222	85.6%	10.4%	3.2%	0.0%	0.9%	0.0%
French Valley	Riverside	23,097	66.7%	11.6%	17.2%	2.7%	1.7%	24.2%
Fresno	Fresno	489,922	54.0%	25.0%	12.4%	7.5%	1.1%	46.4%
Friant	Fresno	372	99.5%	0.3%	0.0%	0.3%	0.0%	0.8%
Fruitdale	Santa Clara	1,087	82.9%	1.0%	9.6%	3.2%	3.3%	7.2%
Fruitridge Pocket	Sacramento	5,675	37.9%	21.3%	22.4%	15.0%	3.3%	43.5%
Fuller Acres	Kern	912	43.0%	53.8%	0.0%	0.0%	3.2%	84.9%
Fullerton	Orange	134,079	53.6%	19.3%	23.3%	3.0%	0.7%	33.1%
Fulton	Sonoma	691	54.6%	36.0%	9.4%	0.0%	0.0%	36.0%
Furnace Creek	Inyo	115	79.1%	0.0%	0.0%	0.0%	20.9%	8.7%
Galt	Sacramento	23,393	67.5%	26.3%	2.0%	2.7%	1.5%	38.5%
Garberville	Humboldt	610	97.0%	3.0%	0.0%	0.0%	0.0%	3.4%
Gardena	Los Angeles	58,743	23.1%	24.5%	28.1%	22.8%	1.4%	36.9%
Garden Acres	San Joaquin	10,516	60.5%	32.6%	2.4%	2.3%	2.1%	68.0%
Garden Farms	San Luis Obispo	335	100.0%	0.0%	0.0%	0.0%	0.0%	0.0%
Garden Grove	Orange	170,148	43.2%	16.4%	37.8%	1.2%	1.4%	36.3%
Garey	Santa Barbara	160	40.6%	59.4%	0.0%	0.0%	0.0%	65.6%
Garnet	Riverside	5,701	66.0%	28.2%	1.8%	3.7%	0.2%	69.4%
Gasquet	Del Norte	551	100.0%	0.0%	0.0%	0.0%	0.0%	14.3%
Gazelle	Siskiyou	153	71.2%	24.8%	0.0%	0.0%	3.9%	22.2%
Georgetown	El Dorado	2,338	89.9%	8.2%	0.0%	0.1%	1.8%	10.7%
Gerber	Tehama	855	72.7%	24.3%	0.0%	0.0%	2.9%	51.0%
Geyserville	Sonoma	1,024	58.1%	37.6%	2.4%	0.0%	1.9%	56.7%
Gilroy	Santa Clara	47,808	70.4%	19.3%	6.4%	2.0%	1.9%	56.0%
Glen Avon	Riverside	20,393	56.8%	35.9%	2.3%	4.4%	0.7%	69.0%
Glendale	Los Angeles	192,069	74.3%	7.5%	16.2%	1.7%	0.4%	17.2%
Glendora	Los Angeles	50,000	77.8%	11.5%	7.0%	2.4%	1.3%	29.4%
Glen Ellen	Sonoma	549	91.4%	7.3%	0.0%	1.3%	0.0%	10.4%
Golden Hills	Kern	8,106	89.7%	8.4%	1.4%	0.3%	0.2%	18.4%
Gold Mountain	Plumas	0	0.0%	0.0%	0.0%	0.0%	0.0%	0.0%
Gold River	Sacramento	8,272	71.5%	7.0%	18.2%	3.3%	0.0%	5.8%
Goleta	Santa Barbara	29,634	74.5%	14.5%	9.6%	1.1%	0.4%	30.5%
Gonzales	Monterey	8,074	79.9%	17.9%	0.8%	1.4%	0.0%	89.4%
Good Hope	Riverside	9,194	40.9%	48.1%	1.1%	8.4%	1.5%	75.2%
Goodyears Bar	Sierra	156	100.0%	0.0%	0.0%	0.0%	0.0%	0.0%
Goshen	Tulare	3,586	81.6%	14.2%	1.2%	2.5%	0.5%	80.0%
Graeagle	Plumas	749	100.0%	0.0%	0.0%	0.0%	0.0%	1.6%
Grand Terrace	San Bernardino	12,132	65.4%	20.8%	7.6%	5.6%	0.6%	37.9%
Grangeville	Kings	464	95.7%	4.3%	0.0%	0.0%	0.0%	19.0%
Granite Bay	Placer	22,201	88.0%	5.3%	5.2%	0.4%	1.2%	5.3%
Granite Hills	San Diego	3,434	87.0%	10.4%	1.0%	0.0%	1.6%	16.6%
Graniteville	Nevada	0	0.0%	0.0%	0.0%	0.0%	0.0%	0.0%
Grass Valley	Nevada	12,793	87.4%	4.3%	2.0%	0.9%	5.4%	14.7%
Graton	Sonoma	1,621	83.0%	14.4%	0.0%	0.3%	2.3%	22.8%
Grayson	Stanislaus	1,324	74.5%	13.2%	0.0%	12.3%	0.0%	83.5%
Greeley Hill	Mariposa	805	97.8%	0.6%	0.0%	0.1%	1.5%	6.3%
Greenacres	Kern	5,875	83.5%	14.4%	1.6%	0.3%	0.3%	20.9%
Green Acres	Riverside	1,832	78.7%	12.6%	0.7%	3.8%	4.2%	25.2%
Greenfield	Kern	3,628	82.4%	16.2%	0.0%	1.4%	0.0%	59.8%
Greenfield	Monterey	15,864	66.4%	21.3%	4.2%	1.0%	7.1%	87.9%
Greenhorn	Plumas	159	100.0%	0.0%	0.0%	0.0%	0.0%	0.0%
Green Valley (Los Angeles County)	Los Angeles	1,113	80.8%	16.4%	2.9%	0.0%	0.0%	8.7%
Green Valley (Solano County)	Solano	1,719	85.7%	8.7%	2.4%	3.1%	0.0%	8.0%
Greenview	Siskiyou	376	89.4%	10.6%	0.0%	0.0%	0.0%	0.0%
Greenville	Plumas	936	77.9%	1.6%	0.0%	0.0%	20.5%	1.4%
Grenada	Siskiyou	322	81.4%	8.7%	0.0%	0.0%	9.9%	2.8%
Gridley	Butte	6,509	79.8%	18.8%	0.0%	1.0%	0.4%	50.5%
Grimes	Colusa	517	64.2%	35.8%	0.0%	0.0%	0.0%	81.8%
Grizzly Flats	El Dorado	923	97.4%	0.0%	0.9%	0.0%	1.7%	6.7%
Groveland	Tuolumne	612	97.2%	2.8%	0.0%	0.0%	0.0%	0.0%
Grover Beach	San Luis Obispo	13,175	81.6%	9.9%	6.0%	1.4%	1.0%	21.0%
Guadalupe	Santa Barbara	6,901	82.2%	13.4%	1.2%	1.2%	2.0%	85.3%
Guerneville	Sonoma	4,187	90.6%	5.4%	0.3%	2.1%	1.6%	11.6%
Guinda	Yolo	450	50.0%	14.4%	2.4%	33.1%	0.0%	12.2%
Gustine	Merced	5,484	85.8%	13.2%	0.3%	0.0%	0.6%	56.1%
Hacienda Heights	Los Angeles	55,684	46.0%	15.6%	36.6%	1.0%	0.8%	43.6%
Half Moon Bay	San Mateo	11,228	84.7%	10.4%	3.7%	1.1%	0.0%	29.8%
Hamilton Branch	Plumas	687	100.0%	0.0%	0.0%	0.0%	0.0%	0.0%
Hamilton City	Glenn	1,992	66.1%	32.4%	0.0%	1.5%	0.0%	91.1%
Hanford	Kings	53,159	76.2%	11.9%	4.6%	6.7%	0.6%	44.3%
Happy Camp	Siskiyou	1,170	61.3%	12.2%	6.9%	0.8%	18.8%	4.6%
Harbison Canyon	San Diego	4,131	86.7%	9.7%	1.3%	0.3%	1.9%	13.3%
Hardwick	Kings	107	33.6%	64.5%	1.9%	0.0%	0.0%	64.5%
Hartland	Tulare	0	0.0%	0.0%	0.0%	0.0%	0.0%	0.0%
Hartley	Solano	2,229	85.3%	4.4%	1.7%	7.3%	1.3%	12.7%
Hasley Canyon	Los Angeles	1,301	84.5%	14.7%	0.8%	0.0%	0.0%	17.2%
Hat Creek	Shasta	183	100.0%	0.0%	0.0%	0.0%	0.0%	24.0%
Hawaiian Gardens	Los Angeles	14,309	58.7%	27.6%	9.5%	3.2%	0.9%	78.1%
Hawthorne	Los Angeles	84,293	47.0%	18.7%	6.2%	27.1%	0.9%	53.0%
Hayfork	Trinity	2,063	83.9%	10.9%	3.6%	0.0%	1.6%	7.7%
Hayward	Alameda	142,936	36.9%	24.9%	23.6%	11.4%	3.2%	39.9%
Healdsburg	Sonoma	11,161	79.1%	17.7%	0.3%	0.8%	2.2%	33.0%
Heber	Imperial	5,662	57.7%	39.0%	0.0%	0.0%	3.2%	98.6%
Hemet	Riverside	77,752	73.5%	16.6%	2.7%	5.2%	2.0%	34.1%
Herald	Sacramento	1,019	93.3%	6.7%	0.0%	0.0%	0.0%	9.6%
Hercules	Contra Costa	23,556	28.3%	9.0%	43.8%	16.7%	2.1%	12.2%
Herlong	Lassen	1,260	32.0%	38.5%	1.0%	24.4%	4.1%	47.0%
Hermosa Beach	Los Angeles	19,422	85.6%	6.3%	7.0%	1.0%	0.2%	8.4%
Hesperia	San Bernardino	88,247	74.9%	15.0%	2.1%	6.3%	1.7%	47.9%
Hickman	Stanislaus	490	95.1%	4.3%	0.6%	0.0%	0.0%	9.8%
Hidden Hills	Los Angeles	2,370	94.1%	3.7%	2.3%	0.0%	0.0%	5.6%
Hidden Meadows	San Diego	3,892	85.0%	3.8%	9.4%	1.5%	0.3%	6.6%
Hidden Valley Lake	Lake	6,243	87.2%	9.4%	1.4%	0.0%	2.0%	17.1%
Highgrove	Riverside	4,155	72.8%	15.0%	5.9%	4.1%	2.2%	67.3%
Highland	San Bernardino	52,777	52.4%	29.5%	7.1%	10.1%	0.9%	47.9%
Highlands-Baywood Park	San Mateo	4,198	65.5%	10.5%	23.1%	0.5%	0.4%	5.9%
Hillsborough	San Mateo	10,748	67.8%	5.3%	26.0%	0.6%	0.2%	2.1%
Hilmar-Irwin	Merced	5,224	95.1%	3.6%	1.0%	0.2%	0.0%	9.2%
Hiouchi	Del Norte	472	91.9%	6.8%	1.3%	0.0%	0.0%	8.3%
Hollister	San Benito	34,733	71.2%	23.2%	2.7%	1.6%	1.4%	65.7%
Holtville	Imperial	5,908	68.0%	29.0%	1.0%	0.4%	1.6%	80.5%
Home Garden	Kings	1,726	59.4%	18.3%	0.9%	16.7%	4.7%	59.1%
Home Gardens	Riverside	11,179	61.9%	25.6%	8.4%	3.5%	0.6%	70.4%
Homeland	Riverside	6,441	68.1%	30.0%	0.5%	0.0%	1.5%	55.7%
Homestead Valley	San Bernardino	3,072	94.7%	3.6%	1.3%	0.0%	0.4%	3.8%
Homewood Canyon	Inyo	79	100.0%	0.0%	0.0%	0.0%	0.0%	0.0%
Honcut	Butte	745	54.6%	43.9%	0.0%	1.5%	0.0%	52.5%
Hood	Sacramento	206	78.2%	18.4%	3.4%	0.0%	0.0%	69.9%
Hopland	Mendocino	743	91.5%	7.0%	0.0%	0.0%	1.5%	44.3%
Hornbrook	Siskiyou	334	89.8%	1.5%	2.4%	0.0%	6.3%	5.7%
Hornitos	Mariposa	67	100.0%	0.0%	0.0%	0.0%	0.0%	0.0%
Hughson	Stanislaus	6,425	78.2%	18.5%	1.7%	0.4%	1.2%	49.4%
Humboldt Hill	Humboldt	4,145	76.5%	7.3%	1.9%	2.6%	11.8%	12.4%
Huntington Beach	Orange	189,744	77.8%	9.5%	11.0%	0.8%	0.9%	17.1%
Huntington Park	Los Angeles	58,465	66.3%	31.7%	0.8%	0.6%	0.6%	97.6%
Huron	Fresno	6,733	83.6%	15.9%	0.1%	0.4%	0.0%	99.1%
Hyampom	Trinity	190	71.1%	28.9%	0.0%	0.0%	0.0%	0.0%
Hydesville	Humboldt	1,114	88.4%	3.6%	4.7%	1.3%	2.0%	7.2%
Idlewild	Tulare	29	82.8%	0.0%	0.0%	0.0%	17.2%	0.0%
Idyllwild-Pine Cove	Riverside	2,309	95.5%	1.0%	3.5%	0.0%	0.0%	16.5%
Imperial	Imperial	14,017	76.4%	17.5%	2.3%	2.4%	1.4%	76.1%
Imperial Beach	San Diego	26,348	72.9%	13.1%	8.0%	4.7%	1.4%	45.9%
Independence	Inyo	520	73.8%	7.1%	0.6%	2.1%	16.3%	7.9%
Indian Falls	Plumas	25	100.0%	0.0%	0.0%	0.0%	0.0%	0.0%
Indianola	Humboldt	1,167	83.7%	6.4%	1.8%	0.0%	8.1%	0.9%
Indian Wells	Riverside	4,937	93.0%	2.5%	2.9%	1.6%	0.0%	6.0%
Indio	Riverside	74,402	62.6%	33.0%	1.7%	1.8%	0.8%	68.4%
Indio Hills	Riverside	876	60.7%	36.2%	0.0%	3.1%	0.0%	69.5%
Industry	Los Angeles	518	79.0%	8.9%	6.0%	6.2%	0.0%	49.8%
Inglewood	Los Angeles	109,967	23.5%	30.4%	1.4%	43.9%	0.7%	49.4%
Interlaken	Santa Cruz	7,002	73.5%	22.2%	3.8%	0.4%	0.1%	72.5%
Inverness	Marin	1,335	97.1%	1.1%	0.0%	1.8%	0.0%	3.7%
Inyokern	Kern	1,321	81.1%	6.8%	0.0%	0.0%	12.1%	8.6%
Ione	Amador	7,873	70.7%	14.6%	2.6%	9.7%	2.4%	25.3%
Iron Horse	Plumas	237	100.0%	0.0%	0.0%	0.0%	0.0%	19.4%
Irvine	Orange	205,057	53.7%	6.2%	37.5%	1.8%	0.7%	9.4%
Irwindale	Los Angeles	1,525	49.1%	44.5%	1.0%	1.0%	4.3%	92.5%
Isla Vista	Santa Barbara	23,640	66.1%	15.7%	14.6%	2.0%	1.5%	21.9%
Isleton	Sacramento	702	72.4%	16.0%	10.4%	1.3%	0.0%	40.3%
Ivanhoe	Tulare	4,614	86.0%	13.2%	0.9%	0.0%	0.0%	81.3%
Jackson	Amador	4,626	90.7%	4.8%	1.2%	0.8%	2.5%	16.6%
Jacumba	San Diego	375	91.7%	2.7%	0.0%	0.0%	5.6%	74.7%
Jamestown	Tuolumne	4,031	89.4%	10.4%	0.2%	0.0%	0.0%	19.7%
Jamul	San Diego	5,145	84.8%	8.9%	2.2%	3.6%	0.5%	17.4%
Janesville	Lassen	1,302	92.8%	1.2%	6.0%	0.0%	0.0%	2.5%
Jenner	Sonoma	113	100.0%	0.0%	0.0%	0.0%	0.0%	0.0%
Johannesburg	Kern	179	100.0%	0.0%	0.0%	0.0%	0.0%	0.0%
Johnstonville	Lassen	656	97.0%	0.9%	0.0%	0.0%	2.1%	5.6%
Johnsville	Plumas	82	48.8%	51.2%	0.0%	0.0%	0.0%	0.0%
Joshua Tree	San Bernardino	7,194	82.4%	10.6%	2.7%	3.0%	1.3%	16.4%
Julian	San Diego	1,403	93.5%	3.2%	0.6%	0.0%	2.7%	9.0%
Junction City	Trinity	955	96.1%	3.4%	0.0%	0.0%	0.5%	5.1%
June Lake	Mono	406	100.0%	0.0%	0.0%	0.0%	0.0%	0.0%
Keddie	Plumas	153	100.0%	0.0%	0.0%	0.0%	0.0%	0.0%
Keeler	Inyo	88	100.0%	0.0%	0.0%	0.0%	0.0%	0.0%
Keene	Kern	340	89.7%	1.2%	0.0%	9.1%	0.0%	9.1%
Kelly Ridge	Butte	2,246	99.2%	0.0%	0.0%	0.8%	0.0%	0.0%
Kelseyville	Lake	2,923	65.8%	26.5%	0.0%	0.3%	7.4%	33.3%
Kennedy	San Joaquin	3,756	61.1%	28.8%	0.8%	9.2%	0.1%	81.2%
Kennedy Meadows	Tulare	18	100.0%	0.0%	0.0%	0.0%	0.0%	0.0%
Kensington	Contra Costa	5,117	78.6%	7.7%	12.3%	1.0%	0.4%	4.3%
Kentfield	Marin	6,669	90.4%	3.7%	3.0%	1.2%	1.8%	5.5%
Kenwood	Sonoma	509	80.6%	17.3%	2.2%	0.0%	0.0%	18.3%
Kerman	Fresno	13,093	75.6%	17.0%	7.3%	0.0%	0.1%	70.6%
Kernville	Kern	1,595	85.3%	6.1%	0.4%	2.4%	5.8%	10.2%
Keswick	Shasta	660	96.5%	3.5%	0.0%	0.0%	0.0%	3.0%
Kettleman City	Kings	1,207	80.9%	14.5%	0.0%	0.0%	4.6%	100.0%
Keyes	Stanislaus	5,809	76.7%	19.8%	2.0%	0.7%	0.7%	60.9%
King City	Monterey	12,629	74.6%	22.8%	1.5%	0.8%	0.3%	87.2%
Kings Beach	Placer	3,136	95.7%	2.8%	0.0%	0.3%	1.2%	61.3%
Kingsburg	Fresno	11,221	69.1%	24.8%	4.9%	0.3%	0.9%	49.0%
Kingvale	Nevada; Placer	158	100.0%	0.0%	0.0%	0.0%	0.0%	0.0%
Kirkwood	Alpine; Amador	123	46.3%	50.4%	3.3%	0.0%	0.0%	50.4%
Klamath	Del Norte	956	49.0%	21.8%	4.0%	0.3%	25.0%	8.3%
Knightsen	Contra Costa	1,484	78.3%	19.6%	0.6%	1.1%	0.3%	30.6%
Knights Landing	Yolo	958	94.6%	1.5%	0.0%	0.0%	4.0%	47.6%
La Cañada Flintridge	Los Angeles	20,248	71.0%	2.9%	25.7%	0.3%	0.1%	4.9%
La Crescenta-Montrose	Los Angeles	19,785	62.1%	7.8%	28.3%	0.5%	1.3%	12.1%
Ladera	San Mateo	1,649	95.8%	1.6%	2.5%	0.0%	0.0%	3.7%
Ladera Heights	Los Angeles	6,624	13.8%	2.5%	1.7%	79.7%	2.3%	3.2%
Ladera Ranch	Orange	21,412	79.4%	8.4%	11.3%	0.8%	0.1%	15.6%
Lafayette	Contra Costa	23,863	86.7%	4.6%	8.1%	0.6%	0.0%	6.3%
Laguna Beach	Orange	22,808	91.2%	4.2%	3.7%	0.7%	0.2%	7.3%
Laguna Hills	Orange	30,477	74.0%	13.4%	11.7%	0.5%	0.4%	18.6%
Laguna Niguel	Orange	62,855	79.5%	8.2%	9.7%	2.1%	0.5%	12.5%
Laguna Woods	Orange	16,276	88.0%	1.6%	9.5%	0.9%	0.0%	3.8%
Lagunitas-Forest Knolls	Marin	2,307	73.0%	17.3%	2.0%	5.5%	2.2%	19.1%
La Habra	Orange	60,117	54.8%	35.4%	7.2%	2.0%	0.6%	58.0%
La Habra Heights	Los Angeles	5,304	78.5%	8.4%	12.6%	0.5%	0.0%	24.1%
La Honda	San Mateo	1,035	92.5%	4.3%	2.6%	0.3%	0.3%	6.9%
Lake Almanor Country Club	Plumas	827	81.5%	5.7%	2.8%	0.0%	10.0%	5.7%
Lake Almanor Peninsula	Plumas	234	85.5%	0.0%	0.0%	0.0%	14.5%	0.0%
Lake Almanor West	Plumas	334	100.0%	0.0%	0.0%	0.0%	0.0%	0.0%
Lake Arrowhead	San Bernardino	9,434	81.0%	16.4%	0.6%	1.4%	0.6%	23.7%
Lake California	Tehama	2,855	90.2%	4.9%	0.5%	0.0%	4.3%	4.5%
Lake City	Modoc	66	100.0%	0.0%	0.0%	0.0%	0.0%	0.0%
Lake Davis	Plumas	13	100.0%	0.0%	0.0%	0.0%	0.0%	0.0%
Lake Don Pedro	Mariposa	1,088	88.4%	7.1%	3.4%	1.1%	0.0%	14.8%
Lake Elsinore	Riverside	50,405	61.3%	26.1%	5.1%	6.0%	1.6%	47.9%
Lake Forest	Orange	77,111	67.3%	14.9%	15.1%	1.9%	0.7%	22.8%
Lakehead	Shasta	347	78.1%	1.7%	12.1%	0.0%	8.1%	4.0%
Lake Hughes	Los Angeles	680	68.1%	25.1%	0.0%	2.8%	4.0%	25.7%
Lake Isabella	Kern	2,960	96.0%	2.3%	0.0%	1.7%	0.0%	18.8%
Lakeland Village	Riverside	11,558	67.7%	22.8%	4.0%	2.8%	2.5%	39.6%
Lake Los Angeles	Los Angeles	12,053	73.4%	16.0%	0.6%	9.7%	0.2%	52.5%
Lake Mathews	Riverside	5,651	58.3%	28.5%	1.6%	10.1%	1.5%	35.4%
Lake Nacimiento	San Luis Obispo	2,397	96.0%	4.0%	0.0%	0.0%	0.0%	12.3%
Lake of the Pines	Nevada	3,684	92.3%	5.0%	1.8%	0.4%	0.4%	6.4%
Lake of the Woods	Kern	814	78.9%	10.3%	5.8%	0.0%	5.0%	12.5%
Lakeport	Lake	4,799	86.2%	10.9%	0.8%	1.2%	0.9%	9.1%
Lake Riverside	Riverside	1,384	95.2%	2.5%	0.0%	1.4%	0.9%	26.9%
Lake San Marcos	San Diego	5,240	86.7%	10.0%	2.0%	1.0%	0.2%	10.9%
Lake Sherwood	Ventura	1,396	88.4%	6.0%	0.5%	2.5%	2.6%	2.9%
Lakeside	San Diego	20,831	92.4%	4.7%	1.1%	1.0%	0.8%	20.3%
Lakeview	Riverside	1,337	67.1%	31.1%	0.0%	0.0%	1.8%	79.9%
Lake Wildwood	Nevada	5,666	94.8%	3.3%	0.3%	0.0%	1.6%	8.7%
Lakewood	Los Angeles	79,994	52.8%	21.4%	16.1%	7.8%	1.9%	30.4%
La Mesa	San Diego	56,722	74.6%	10.5%	6.5%	7.6%	0.8%	18.8%
La Mirada	Los Angeles	48,363	54.8%	23.9%	18.4%	2.1%	0.8%	40.1%
Lamont	Kern	15,883	66.8%	30.9%	1.3%	0.2%	0.9%	94.9%
Lanare	Fresno	428	48.4%	51.6%	0.0%	0.0%	0.0%	100.0%
Lancaster	Los Angeles	152,678	59.5%	13.7%	5.7%	20.0%	1.1%	36.7%
La Palma	Orange	15,536	40.4%	6.3%	45.7%	6.5%	1.1%	13.7%
La Porte	Plumas	32	100.0%	0.0%	0.0%	0.0%	0.0%	0.0%
La Presa	San Diego	34,607	65.5%	10.3%	10.4%	13.0%	0.9%	46.7%
La Puente	Los Angeles	39,957	63.5%	26.1%	7.6%	1.6%	1.2%	86.0%
La Quinta	Riverside	36,600	82.4%	11.8%	2.8%	1.7%	1.3%	30.1%
La Riviera	Sacramento	10,971	68.0%	12.3%	7.6%	11.4%	0.7%	16.8%
Larkfield-Wikiup	Sonoma	8,569	88.3%	7.7%	3.3%	0.2%	0.5%	17.6%
Larkspur	Marin	11,870	88.6%	6.4%	3.1%	1.2%	0.7%	9.6%
La Selva Beach	Santa Cruz	2,597	95.0%	1.2%	3.2%	0.7%	0.0%	5.2%
Las Flores (Orange County)	Orange	5,911	76.3%	8.1%	14.2%	1.0%	0.4%	12.5%
Las Flores (Tehama County)	Tehama	100	74.0%	26.0%	0.0%	0.0%	0.0%	0.0%
Las Lomas	Monterey	2,820	84.8%	15.2%	0.0%	0.0%	0.0%	89.3%
Lathrop	San Joaquin	17,488	51.4%	16.2%	24.4%	5.8%	2.1%	44.7%
Laton	Fresno	1,274	70.6%	27.6%	0.6%	1.2%	0.0%	63.6%
La Verne	Los Angeles	31,139	76.6%	10.7%	8.0%	4.1%	0.5%	29.2%
La Vina	Madera	788	100.0%	0.0%	0.0%	0.0%	0.0%	100.0%
Lawndale	Los Angeles	32,652	48.4%	31.1%	10.9%	8.4%	1.1%	59.9%
Laytonville	Mendocino	1,384	81.7%	1.4%	0.9%	0.0%	16.0%	11.0%
Lebec	Kern	1,676	80.0%	17.4%	0.0%	0.0%	2.6%	30.9%
Lee Vining	Mono	406	32.8%	13.1%	0.0%	0.0%	54.2%	50.7%
Leggett	Mendocino	51	100.0%	0.0%	0.0%	0.0%	0.0%	3.9%
Le Grand	Merced	1,893	51.8%	47.4%	0.0%	0.0%	0.8%	88.4%
Lemon Cove	Tulare	202	93.1%	2.0%	0.0%	5.0%	0.0%	27.7%
Lemon Grove	San Diego	25,250	59.8%	22.6%	5.4%	11.1%	1.1%	41.7%
Lemon Hill	Sacramento	13,348	45.7%	22.2%	19.2%	9.5%	3.4%	46.2%
Lemoore	Kings	24,217	68.2%	14.4%	6.5%	8.7%	2.3%	36.2%
Lemoore Station	Kings	7,129	69.2%	11.1%	9.9%	9.5%	0.3%	17.2%
Lennox	Los Angeles	22,303	32.7%	59.8%	0.4%	5.9%	1.1%	91.0%
Lenwood	San Bernardino	3,784	63.3%	25.1%	0.4%	9.4%	1.8%	44.7%
Leona Valley	Los Angeles	1,981	93.1%	4.7%	2.1%	0.0%	0.0%	5.6%
Lewiston	Trinity	1,391	89.1%	6.8%	0.0%	0.0%	4.1%	5.6%
Lexington Hills	Santa Clara	2,298	88.7%	3.4%	6.4%	0.4%	1.1%	2.3%
Likely	Modoc	100	100.0%	0.0%	0.0%	0.0%	0.0%	0.0%
Lincoln	Placer	40,177	79.0%	11.6%	6.2%	2.2%	1.0%	18.7%
Lincoln Village	San Joaquin	4,363	64.6%	23.2%	8.2%	3.3%	0.7%	30.5%
Linda	Yuba	17,883	61.9%	22.7%	11.1%	1.4%	2.8%	32.3%
Lindcove	Tulare	350	85.1%	12.0%	0.0%	0.0%	2.9%	54.0%
Linden	San Joaquin	1,874	94.1%	4.7%	0.0%	1.2%	0.0%	17.6%
Lindsay	Tulare	11,664	79.4%	17.2%	2.6%	0.7%	0.1%	86.5%
Linnell Camp	Tulare	735	96.6%	3.4%	0.0%	0.0%	0.0%	100.0%
Litchfield	Lassen	95	100.0%	0.0%	0.0%	0.0%	0.0%	0.0%
Little Grass Valley	Plumas	20	100.0%	0.0%	0.0%	0.0%	0.0%	0.0%
Little River	Mendocino	261	100.0%	0.0%	0.0%	0.0%	0.0%	0.0%
Littlerock	Los Angeles	1,237	64.1%	31.8%	0.9%	3.2%	0.0%	42.4%
Live Oak	Santa Cruz	16,550	79.8%	12.6%	6.6%	0.6%	0.4%	28.2%
Live Oak	Sutter	8,244	58.4%	30.7%	8.3%	0.4%	2.2%	50.3%
Livermore	Alameda	79,710	78.9%	8.4%	10.3%	1.8%	0.5%	19.0%
Livingston	Merced	12,899	48.0%	32.8%	17.5%	0.9%	0.9%	71.5%
Lockeford	San Joaquin	3,241	94.0%	5.9%	0.1%	0.0%	0.0%	31.1%
Lockwood	Monterey	255	96.1%	0.0%	0.0%	3.9%	0.0%	14.1%
Lodi	San Joaquin	62,354	79.1%	11.7%	6.5%	1.7%	1.0%	33.8%
Lodoga	Colusa	185	85.4%	5.9%	0.0%	4.3%	4.3%	0.0%
Loleta	Humboldt	705	87.5%	9.2%	3.3%	0.0%	0.0%	3.8%
Loma Linda	San Bernardino	23,081	48.4%	15.0%	28.7%	6.8%	1.1%	22.8%
Loma Mar	San Mateo	72	79.2%	20.8%	0.0%	0.0%	0.0%	0.0%
Loma Rica	Yuba	2,648	86.1%	12.6%	1.3%	0.0%	0.0%	8.3%
Lomita	Los Angeles	20,246	61.8%	18.2%	16.4%	1.9%	1.8%	38.2%
Lompico	Santa Cruz	931	87.3%	8.6%	4.1%	0.0%	0.0%	10.0%
Lompoc	Santa Barbara	42,178	64.8%	24.3%	2.9%	5.8%	2.2%	51.7%
London	Tulare	1,927	76.6%	18.9%	2.6%	0.0%	1.8%	90.4%
Lone Pine	Inyo	2,076	79.1%	5.3%	3.0%	1.3%	11.2%	18.3%
Long Barn	Tuolumne	353	100.0%	0.0%	0.0%	0.0%	0.0%	0.0%
Long Beach	Los Angeles	462,197	49.7%	22.1%	13.2%	13.5%	1.5%	40.1%
Lookout	Modoc	5	0.0%	100.0%	0.0%	0.0%	0.0%	0.0%
Loomis	Placer	6,511	92.2%	3.1%	3.7%	0.8%	0.2%	3.1%
Los Alamitos	Orange	11,442	73.0%	9.6%	13.7%	3.3%	0.4%	20.5%
Los Alamos	Santa Barbara	1,430	63.2%	30.9%	2.4%	0.0%	3.4%	49.9%
Los Altos	Santa Clara	28,752	71.4%	6.2%	21.6%	0.6%	0.3%	5.9%
Los Altos Hills	Santa Clara	7,912	66.2%	1.9%	31.7%	0.1%	0.0%	1.9%
Los Angeles	Los Angeles	3,782,544	51.9%	26.4%	11.4%	9.6%	0.7%	48.1%
Los Banos	Merced	35,252	81.0%	11.3%	3.3%	3.9%	0.5%	67.4%
Los Berros	San Luis Obispo	920	86.2%	13.8%	0.0%	0.0%	0.0%	19.8%
Los Gatos	Santa Clara	29,165	84.0%	4.3%	9.2%	1.6%	0.8%	5.6%
Los Molinos	Tehama	2,479	84.0%	15.4%	0.0%	0.0%	0.6%	24.7%
Los Olivos	Santa Barbara	928	95.7%	3.2%	0.4%	0.0%	0.6%	6.6%
Los Osos	San Luis Obispo	14,950	85.3%	7.5%	6.3%	0.4%	0.5%	12.4%
Los Ranchos	San Luis Obispo	1,578	91.4%	3.1%	1.5%	0.8%	3.2%	2.1%
Lost Hills	Kern	2,075	97.1%	2.9%	0.0%	0.0%	0.0%	98.5%
Lower Lake	Lake	1,308	71.9%	11.7%	0.5%	0.0%	15.9%	13.3%
Loyalton	Sierra	890	89.0%	8.1%	0.2%	1.5%	1.2%	12.5%
Loyola	Santa Clara	3,747	74.0%	3.9%	20.9%	0.0%	1.2%	2.3%
Lucas Valley-Marinwood	Marin	5,909	85.8%	6.1%	6.2%	1.4%	0.4%	5.6%
Lucerne	Lake	2,493	76.1%	2.4%	0.5%	5.3%	15.6%	4.6%
Lucerne Valley	San Bernardino	6,029	76.4%	6.6%	1.7%	12.1%	3.1%	21.3%
Lynwood	Los Angeles	69,818	33.4%	56.1%	0.8%	9.2%	0.5%	87.2%
Lytle Creek	San Bernardino	735	86.8%	2.3%	8.2%	0.0%	2.7%	27.3%
Mabie	Plumas	108	100.0%	0.0%	0.0%	0.0%	0.0%	0.0%
McArthur	Shasta	229	100.0%	0.0%	0.0%	0.0%	0.0%	21.8%
McClellan Park	Sacramento	946	35.1%	20.6%	26.7%	17.5%	0.0%	24.4%
McClenney Tract	Tulare	6	100.0%	0.0%	0.0%	0.0%	0.0%	0.0%
McCloud	Siskiyou	1,288	94.5%	1.6%	2.2%	0.8%	1.0%	5.1%
Macdoel	Siskiyou	108	38.0%	62.0%	0.0%	0.0%	0.0%	72.2%
McFarland	Kern	12,530	82.1%	14.1%	0.8%	2.4%	0.6%	89.2%
McGee Creek	Mono	107	100.0%	0.0%	0.0%	0.0%	0.0%	0.0%
McKinleyville	Humboldt	16,701	87.5%	6.4%	1.2%	0.1%	4.8%	7.9%
McKittrick	Kern	113	90.3%	8.0%	0.0%	0.0%	1.8%	39.8%
McSwain	Merced	4,041	82.8%	8.8%	6.7%	0.3%	1.4%	20.6%
Madera	Madera	60,221	80.2%	12.7%	2.9%	3.0%	1.3%	74.9%
Madera Acres	Madera	9,201	80.2%	14.6%	0.3%	2.4%	2.5%	63.7%
Madison	Yolo	287	54.4%	45.6%	0.0%	0.0%	0.0%	76.0%
Mad River	Trinity	391	90.8%	2.3%	0.0%	0.0%	6.9%	1.8%
Magalia	Butte	11,188	90.5%	5.7%	1.8%	0.2%	1.8%	9.2%
Malaga	Fresno	827	37.0%	63.0%	0.0%	0.0%	0.0%	100.0%
Malibu	Los Angeles	12,746	88.0%	5.7%	3.9%	1.5%	0.8%	6.1%
Mammoth Lakes	Mono	8,081	75.4%	18.6%	0.8%	1.8%	3.3%	35.7%
Manchester	Mendocino	163	81.6%	18.4%	0.0%	0.0%	0.0%	56.4%
Manhattan Beach	Los Angeles	34,986	84.5%	7.4%	7.5%	0.3%	0.3%	8.2%
Manila	Humboldt	810	91.2%	6.0%	0.0%	0.0%	2.7%	1.2%
Manteca	San Joaquin	66,081	75.5%	13.2%	6.5%	3.5%	1.4%	37.4%
Manton	Tehama	313	87.9%	8.3%	0.0%	3.8%	0.0%	7.0%
March ARB	Riverside	791	91.7%	0.1%	3.0%	5.1%	0.1%	11.4%
Maricopa	Kern	1,280	85.1%	12.2%	1.1%	0.9%	0.8%	27.3%
Marina	Monterey	19,636	54.8%	17.9%	15.5%	8.6%	3.2%	29.5%
Marina del Rey	Los Angeles	8,840	78.5%	5.3%	8.5%	7.3%	0.4%	6.4%
Marin City	Marin	2,711	37.1%	13.4%	4.2%	45.0%	0.4%	14.8%
Mariposa	Mariposa	2,479	74.4%	18.3%	0.0%	0.4%	7.0%	27.4%
Markleeville	Alpine	262	92.4%	7.6%	0.0%	0.0%	0.0%	1.1%
Martell	Amador	140	100.0%	0.0%	0.0%	0.0%	0.0%	0.0%
Martinez	Contra Costa	35,808	79.7%	7.4%	7.6%	4.6%	0.6%	13.6%
Marysville	Yuba	12,248	71.1%	15.7%	6.1%	5.7%	1.3%	26.9%
Matheny	Tulare	1,116	72.5%	16.6%	0.0%	9.3%	1.6%	55.7%
Mather	Sacramento	4,650	54.8%	12.5%	16.9%	10.2%	5.5%	14.3%
Maxwell	Colusa	1,144	77.4%	22.2%	0.3%	0.0%	0.0%	65.2%
Mayfair	Fresno	4,346	45.0%	38.9%	11.0%	4.8%	0.3%	46.9%
Mayflower Village	Los Angeles	5,673	53.9%	14.8%	30.5%	0.6%	0.2%	26.4%
Maywood	Los Angeles	27,454	65.8%	32.3%	0.2%	0.8%	0.8%	98.1%
Meadowbrook	Riverside	2,995	40.8%	49.5%	5.0%	4.4%	0.3%	66.7%
Meadow Valley	Plumas	448	98.7%	0.0%	0.0%	1.3%	0.0%	2.2%
Meadow Vista	Placer	3,095	92.5%	2.9%	1.5%	0.0%	3.0%	2.7%
Mead Valley	Riverside	17,498	50.0%	37.5%	1.8%	9.9%	0.8%	69.3%
Mecca	Riverside	8,233	55.3%	43.2%	0.4%	0.0%	1.1%	96.2%
Meiners Oaks	Ventura	3,339	79.5%	15.4%	0.8%	1.1%	3.2%	29.3%
Mendocino	Mendocino	936	93.2%	4.7%	2.1%	0.0%	0.0%	8.5%
Mendota	Fresno	10,729	85.9%	9.2%	2.2%	0.8%	1.9%	96.3%
Menifee	Riverside	75,023	72.7%	13.0%	7.1%	6.0%	1.2%	31.1%
Menlo Park	San Mateo	31,669	73.1%	9.9%	10.2%	6.0%	0.9%	18.1%
Mentone	San Bernardino	8,670	75.5%	12.0%	4.2%	7.7%	0.7%	29.7%
Merced	Merced	78,111	56.1%	24.1%	11.4%	6.8%	1.7%	49.6%
Meridian	Sutter	485	97.3%	2.7%	0.0%	0.0%	0.0%	17.5%
Mesa	Inyo	442	77.4%	17.0%	5.7%	0.0%	0.0%	16.1%
Mesa Verde	Riverside	1,102	59.2%	38.3%	0.0%	2.5%	0.0%	74.6%
Mesa Vista	Alpine	185	88.6%	0.0%	1.1%	0.0%	10.3%	0.0%
Mettler	Kern	145	86.9%	13.1%	0.0%	0.0%	0.0%	94.5%
Mexican Colony	Kern	127	66.1%	33.9%	0.0%	0.0%	0.0%	92.1%
Middletown	Lake	1,848	78.3%	15.5%	0.0%	4.2%	1.9%	41.0%
Midpines	Mariposa	661	91.8%	5.6%	1.7%	0.9%	0.0%	7.1%
Midway City	Orange	8,052	35.2%	15.5%	47.1%	0.2%	1.9%	27.7%
Milford	Lassen	99	100.0%	0.0%	0.0%	0.0%	0.0%	0.0%
Millbrae	San Mateo	21,275	52.6%	5.8%	39.2%	1.9%	0.4%	13.7%
Mill Valley	Marin	13,810	87.8%	5.8%	5.2%	1.0%	0.1%	6.9%
Millville	Shasta	833	94.6%	2.0%	0.0%	0.1%	3.2%	3.1%
Milpitas	Santa Clara	66,038	21.8%	14.6%	59.0%	3.5%	1.1%	17.1%
Mineral	Tehama	133	97.0%	3.0%	0.0%	0.0%	0.0%	4.5%
Minkler	Fresno	831	83.3%	13.0%	2.4%	1.3%	0.0%	23.5%
Mira Loma	Riverside	20,923	58.6%	36.2%	1.7%	3.2%	0.3%	67.5%
Mira Monte	Ventura	7,666	86.7%	9.2%	1.8%	0.9%	1.4%	15.7%
Miranda	Humboldt	100	100.0%	0.0%	0.0%	0.0%	0.0%	0.0%
Mission Canyon	Santa Barbara	1,885	91.5%	8.5%	0.0%	0.0%	0.0%	10.9%
Mission Hills	Santa Barbara	3,512	86.1%	9.9%	1.7%	1.5%	0.9%	37.2%
Mission Viejo	Orange	93,076	79.8%	9.1%	9.2%	1.3%	0.6%	15.3%
Mi-Wuk Village	Tuolumne	761	68.3%	11.8%	0.8%	0.0%	19.1%	7.6%
Modesto	Stanislaus	201,886	74.6%	12.6%	6.8%	3.9%	2.1%	35.7%
Mohawk Vista	Plumas	84	100.0%	0.0%	0.0%	0.0%	0.0%	0.0%
Mojave	Kern	3,987	57.3%	34.5%	0.7%	6.6%	0.8%	49.6%
Mokelumne Hill	Calaveras	717	94.8%	1.5%	0.0%	0.0%	3.6%	11.2%
Monmouth	Fresno	108	63.9%	33.3%	0.0%	2.8%	0.0%	62.0%
Mono City	Mono	126	89.7%	10.3%	0.0%	0.0%	0.0%	0.0%
Mono Vista	Tuolumne	2,638	94.2%	3.0%	0.0%	2.4%	0.4%	13.4%
Monrovia	Los Angeles	36,622	55.4%	25.1%	12.5%	6.7%	0.2%	37.4%
Monson	Tulare	33	75.8%	0.0%	0.0%	0.0%	24.2%	33.3%
Montague	Siskiyou	1,510	80.7%	12.5%	0.6%	0.2%	6.0%	16.9%
Montalvin Manor	Contra Costa	2,614	68.4%	11.0%	11.1%	3.6%	5.9%	49.5%
Montara	San Mateo	2,739	88.6%	5.1%	6.3%	0.0%	0.0%	11.2%
Montclair	San Bernardino	36,802	43.1%	39.8%	10.2%	4.6%	2.3%	67.1%
Montebello	Los Angeles	62,470	57.0%	30.8%	10.2%	1.1%	1.0%	79.1%
Montecito	Santa Barbara	9,079	92.0%	4.6%	1.9%	0.7%	0.8%	6.4%
Monterey	Monterey	27,861	76.4%	10.5%	10.0%	2.6%	0.6%	14.7%
Monterey Park	Los Angeles	60,251	18.8%	14.9%	65.4%	0.3%	0.6%	27.7%
Monterey Park Tract	Stanislaus	350	97.7%	2.3%	0.0%	0.0%	0.0%	27.7%
Monte Rio	Sonoma	1,044	91.9%	5.9%	0.8%	0.0%	1.4%	2.4%
Monte Sereno	Santa Clara	3,338	80.0%	3.5%	14.3%	2.2%	0.0%	6.1%
Montgomery Creek	Shasta	103	77.7%	20.4%	0.0%	1.9%	0.0%	0.0%
Monument Hills	Yolo	1,512	85.6%	9.7%	3.0%	1.7%	0.0%	17.1%
Moorpark	Ventura	34,100	75.1%	18.3%	5.4%	1.0%	0.2%	31.2%
Morada	San Joaquin	4,481	66.3%	18.4%	12.2%	2.3%	0.8%	16.1%
Moraga	Contra Costa	16,033	78.8%	3.5%	14.8%	2.1%	0.7%	7.3%
Moreno Valley	Riverside	190,977	50.4%	25.6%	5.4%	17.6%	1.0%	54.4%
Morgan Hill	Santa Clara	37,278	69.2%	15.9%	11.5%	2.4%	1.0%	34.9%
Morongo Valley	San Bernardino	3,550	81.7%	15.3%	0.1%	0.0%	2.9%	25.4%
Morro Bay	San Luis Obispo	10,263	96.0%	1.7%	1.8%	0.1%	0.4%	17.8%
Moskowite Corner	Napa	151	84.8%	15.2%	0.0%	0.0%	0.0%	0.0%
Moss Beach	San Mateo	2,439	82.3%	17.2%	0.3%	0.2%	0.1%	27.2%
Moss Landing	Monterey	232	95.3%	4.7%	0.0%	0.0%	0.0%	52.6%
Mountain Center	Riverside	66	100.0%	0.0%	0.0%	0.0%	0.0%	0.0%
Mountain Gate	Shasta	1,293	81.4%	15.4%	0.0%	0.0%	3.2%	0.0%
Mountain House	San Joaquin	8,895	37.2%	13.0%	32.3%	13.6%	3.8%	17.8%
Mountain Mesa	Kern	964	83.2%	13.5%	0.0%	3.3%	0.0%	4.7%
Mountain Ranch	Calaveras	1,541	93.3%	0.9%	0.0%	5.8%	0.0%	5.9%
Mountain View	Contra Costa	2,032	89.7%	4.7%	1.5%	2.3%	1.8%	18.7%
Mountain View	Santa Clara	73,394	58.8%	12.8%	25.1%	2.6%	0.8%	21.0%
Mountain View Acres	San Bernardino	3,376	68.5%	18.2%	1.9%	11.1%	0.4%	58.4%
Mount Hebron	Siskiyou	72	94.4%	0.0%	0.0%	0.0%	5.6%	31.9%
Mount Hermon	Santa Cruz	1,017	97.7%	0.9%	0.8%	0.0%	0.6%	28.0%
Mount Laguna	San Diego	0	0.0%	0.0%	0.0%	0.0%	0.0%	0.0%
Mount Shasta	Siskiyou	3,411	93.3%	6.5%	0.0%	0.2%	0.0%	8.6%
Muir Beach	Marin	306	93.8%	0.0%	2.9%	3.3%	0.0%	0.0%
Murphys	Calaveras	1,965	92.6%	3.7%	2.5%	0.0%	1.2%	5.6%
Murrieta	Riverside	99,476	68.2%	15.1%	8.9%	6.5%	1.3%	27.2%
Muscoy	San Bernardino	11,573	52.2%	41.8%	3.2%	1.7%	1.0%	82.8%
Myers Flat	Humboldt	89	100.0%	0.0%	0.0%	0.0%	0.0%	0.0%
Myrtletown	Humboldt	4,586	86.6%	9.4%	1.9%	0.2%	1.9%	9.8%
Napa	Napa	76,560	85.9%	10.0%	2.2%	0.9%	1.0%	38.1%
National City	San Diego	58,015	62.3%	12.9%	20.0%	4.5%	0.4%	64.2%
Needles	San Bernardino	4,910	74.5%	9.3%	1.6%	3.0%	11.5%	16.0%
Nevada City	Nevada	3,081	88.4%	3.2%	6.0%	0.8%	1.5%	10.5%
Newark	Alameda	42,322	42.1%	24.4%	26.2%	4.3%	3.0%	35.2%
Newcastle	Placer	1,166	87.7%	7.5%	0.0%	0.0%	4.9%	10.5%
New Cuyama	Santa Barbara	473	82.9%	11.8%	0.0%	1.1%	4.2%	56.9%
Newell	Modoc	473	88.6%	5.5%	4.2%	0.0%	1.7%	50.3%
Newman	Stanislaus	9,989	73.6%	22.7%	2.0%	1.2%	0.6%	62.6%
New Pine Creek	Modoc	104	93.3%	6.7%	0.0%	0.0%	0.0%	0.0%
Newport Beach	Orange	84,417	87.7%	3.9%	7.6%	0.6%	0.1%	7.1%
Nicasio	Marin	15	100.0%	0.0%	0.0%	0.0%	0.0%	0.0%
Nice	Lake	2,289	95.3%	3.4%	0.0%	1.1%	0.2%	10.2%
Nicolaus	Sutter	183	81.4%	4.4%	13.1%	1.1%	0.0%	0.0%
Niland	Imperial	1,112	86.7%	8.7%	0.0%	1.2%	3.4%	61.7%
Nipinnawasee	Madera	644	90.1%	9.9%	0.0%	0.0%	0.0%	7.1%
Nipomo	San Luis Obispo	16,622	84.1%	12.7%	1.3%	1.3%	0.6%	35.0%
Norco	Riverside	27,131	72.9%	14.8%	4.4%	6.6%	1.2%	28.0%
Nord	Butte	196	100.0%	0.0%	0.0%	0.0%	0.0%	20.4%
Norris Canyon	Contra Costa	941	65.9%	1.2%	32.9%	0.0%	0.0%	0.0%
North Auburn	Placer	13,184	83.0%	10.2%	4.9%	1.1%	0.8%	16.2%
North Edwards	Kern	1,107	74.7%	5.4%	0.0%	19.0%	0.9%	11.3%
North El Monte	Los Angeles	4,075	45.1%	20.0%	33.7%	0.8%	0.4%	35.1%
North Fair Oaks	San Mateo	14,666	70.1%	22.6%	4.0%	1.7%	1.6%	74.3%
North Gate	Contra Costa	387	92.5%	0.0%	7.5%	0.0%	0.0%	0.0%
North Highlands	Sacramento	42,888	62.0%	17.0%	4.5%	14.3%	2.3%	22.8%
North Lakeport	Lake	3,514	89.8%	6.4%	2.0%	0.6%	1.1%	21.7%
North Richmond	Contra Costa	3,214	31.5%	17.8%	16.5%	34.2%	0.0%	43.9%
North San Juan	Nevada	158	60.8%	39.2%	0.0%	0.0%	0.0%	0.0%
North Shore	Riverside	2,600	56.3%	38.5%	0.0%	1.2%	3.9%	93.2%
North Tustin	Orange	24,572	84.9%	4.8%	8.9%	0.5%	0.9%	12.1%
Norwalk	Los Angeles	105,348	49.1%	32.1%	13.7%	4.4%	0.7%	69.0%
Novato	Marin	51,206	76.8%	13.5%	6.4%	2.8%	0.4%	16.9%
Nubieber	Lassen	38	92.1%	7.9%	0.0%	0.0%	0.0%	7.9%
Nuevo	Riverside	5,582	76.4%	19.2%	1.2%	1.7%	1.5%	49.0%
Oakdale	Stanislaus	20,364	87.7%	6.0%	3.2%	0.4%	2.7%	23.3%
Oak Glen	San Bernardino	502	95.6%	1.4%	0.0%	3.0%	0.0%	20.9%
Oak Hills	San Bernardino	8,780	84.2%	9.6%	3.5%	0.7%	2.1%	34.5%
Oakhurst	Madera	3,014	85.7%	12.2%	0.0%	0.6%	1.5%	12.9%
Oakland	Alameda	389,397	39.0%	15.7%	16.1%	28.1%	1.1%	25.0%
Oakley	Contra Costa	34,410	65.3%	20.0%	5.8%	7.8%	1.2%	39.7%
Oak Park	Ventura	14,045	85.4%	4.3%	9.6%	0.6%	0.0%	6.2%
Oak Shores	San Luis Obispo	187	100.0%	0.0%	0.0%	0.0%	0.0%	5.3%
Oak View	Ventura	4,166	81.0%	17.3%	0.0%	0.0%	1.7%	27.8%
Oakville	Napa	137	72.3%	0.0%	0.0%	19.0%	8.8%	1.5%
Oasis	Riverside	6,160	53.7%	42.9%	1.3%	1.2%	0.8%	96.8%
Occidental	Sonoma	1,264	88.8%	5.9%	4.0%	1.3%	0.0%	4.8%
Oceano	San Luis Obispo	7,456	77.3%	19.4%	1.5%	0.0%	1.8%	47.6%
Oceanside	San Diego	166,139	65.1%	21.3%	7.2%	4.5%	1.8%	36.6%
Ocotillo	Imperial	253	98.8%	0.0%	0.0%	0.0%	1.2%	7.1%
Oildale	Kern	32,253	86.1%	10.2%	0.6%	1.4%	1.7%	19.2%
Ojai	Ventura	7,496	84.4%	13.4%	2.0%	0.0%	0.1%	17.0%
Olancha	Inyo	245	52.2%	47.8%	0.0%	0.0%	0.0%	38.8%
Old Fig Garden	Fresno	5,022	79.9%	11.4%	8.4%	0.1%	0.2%	18.5%
Old Station	Shasta	41	100.0%	0.0%	0.0%	0.0%	0.0%	0.0%
Olivehurst	Yuba	13,817	64.3%	26.7%	5.2%	0.8%	3.0%	34.7%
Ontario	San Bernardino	165,120	52.6%	33.9%	4.6%	7.6%	1.4%	66.5%
Onyx	Kern	155	100.0%	0.0%	0.0%	0.0%	0.0%	0.0%
Orange	Orange	135,582	61.5%	24.3%	12.3%	1.3%	0.5%	37.9%
Orange Cove	Fresno	8,889	53.9%	44.1%	0.0%	2.0%	0.0%	95.8%
Orangevale	Sacramento	33,733	88.0%	5.9%	2.8%	2.1%	1.1%	9.5%
Orcutt	Santa Barbara	28,591	85.8%	8.0%	3.6%	1.3%	1.3%	19.8%
Orick	Humboldt	325	79.1%	15.1%	0.0%	0.0%	5.8%	8.3%
Orinda	Contra Costa	17,599	82.0%	6.0%	10.1%	1.7%	0.3%	3.8%
Orland	Glenn	7,214	79.6%	18.0%	1.1%	0.1%	1.2%	43.2%
Orosi	Tulare	9,347	59.0%	28.5%	11.2%	0.5%	0.7%	84.8%
Oroville	Butte	15,445	71.0%	12.8%	11.4%	3.3%	1.4%	11.3%
Oroville East	Butte	9,663	82.1%	9.7%	2.4%	1.2%	4.6%	7.9%
Oxnard	Ventura	194,972	59.7%	26.6%	7.9%	3.2%	2.6%	71.6%
Pacheco	Contra Costa	4,022	76.2%	7.4%	11.9%	2.2%	2.3%	13.9%
Pacifica	San Mateo	37,043	67.3%	10.1%	19.5%	2.2%	0.9%	17.1%
Pacific Grove	Monterey	14,995	85.7%	5.3%	6.5%	1.7%	0.8%	7.9%
Pajaro	Monterey	2,939	88.5%	8.4%	2.4%	0.5%	0.1%	95.1%
Pajaro Dunes	Santa Cruz	243	90.9%	0.0%	5.8%	3.3%	0.0%	0.0%
Palermo	Butte	4,775	77.0%	19.7%	0.8%	1.0%	1.4%	23.2%
Palmdale	Los Angeles	149,001	42.6%	37.8%	4.2%	14.4%	0.9%	53.6%
Palm Desert	Riverside	48,769	86.7%	7.1%	4.2%	1.0%	1.0%	22.2%
Palm Springs	Riverside	45,045	82.0%	8.1%	4.5%	4.5%	0.8%	23.8%
Palo Alto	Santa Clara	63,475	65.5%	5.5%	25.4%	3.3%	0.3%	7.6%
Palo Cedro	Shasta	1,217	87.3%	6.7%	0.0%	1.8%	4.1%	10.6%
Palos Verdes Estates	Los Angeles	13,412	76.0%	3.3%	19.4%	1.3%	0.0%	4.4%
Palo Verde	Imperial	74	73.0%	15.0%	1.0%	1.0%	3.0%	19.0%
Panorama Heights	Tulare	43	74.4%	25.6%	0.0%	0.0%	0.0%	0.0%
Paradise	Butte	26,348	91.0%	6.0%	1.4%	0.8%	0.7%	7.7%
Paradise	Mono	383	94.5%	4.4%	1.0%	0.0%	0.0%	12.0%
Paradise Park	Santa Cruz	413	100.0%	0.0%	0.0%	0.0%	0.0%	0.0%
Paramount	Los Angeles	54,196	33.2%	52.7%	2.6%	9.8%	1.7%	79.5%
Parklawn	Stanislaus	1,180	74.7%	14.9%	10.4%	0.0%	0.0%	76.6%
Parksdale	Madera	3,094	75.0%	19.5%	0.0%	1.1%	4.4%	92.5%
Parkway	Sacramento	14,149	56.1%	14.2%	12.3%	16.6%	0.9%	44.7%
Parkwood	Madera	2,500	66.6%	23.1%	6.1%	4.3%	0.0%	79.3%
Parlier	Fresno	14,204	60.0%	38.4%	0.3%	0.9%	0.4%	97.1%
Pasadena	Los Angeles	136,807	63.4%	11.4%	13.7%	10.9%	0.6%	33.7%
Pasatiempo	Santa Cruz	1,201	89.9%	4.8%	4.4%	0.0%	0.8%	11.2%
Paskenta	Tehama	71	100.0%	0.0%	0.0%	0.0%	0.0%	0.0%
Patterson	Stanislaus	19,697	60.9%	23.1%	4.5%	8.9%	2.6%	57.6%
Patterson Tract	Tulare	1,817	66.5%	17.5%	5.2%	0.0%	10.8%	63.2%
Patton Village	Lassen	624	58.0%	9.6%	0.0%	19.2%	13.1%	8.0%
Paxton	Plumas	0	0.0%	0.0%	0.0%	0.0%	0.0%	0.0%
Paynes Creek	Tehama	56	92.9%	0.0%	0.0%	0.0%	7.1%	14.3%
Pearsonville	Inyo	6	100.0%	0.0%	0.0%	0.0%	0.0%	0.0%
Pedley	Riverside	11,229	72.3%	18.9%	4.1%	3.9%	0.8%	47.9%
Penngrove	Sonoma	2,428	90.6%	8.6%	0.8%	0.0%	0.0%	12.8%
Penn Valley	Nevada	1,328	99.1%	0.9%	0.0%	0.0%	0.0%	1.7%
Penryn	Placer	665	99.1%	0.0%	0.9%	0.0%	0.0%	0.0%
Perris	Riverside	65,993	43.8%	38.8%	3.6%	12.4%	1.4%	70.7%
Pescadero	San Mateo	514	64.4%	35.6%	0.0%	0.0%	0.0%	48.6%
Petaluma	Sonoma	57,265	83.5%	9.2%	5.1%	1.0%	1.1%	21.3%
Peters	San Joaquin	697	83.8%	16.2%	0.0%	0.0%	0.0%	39.3%
Phelan	San Bernardino	12,851	78.5%	14.8%	4.0%	1.2%	1.4%	29.5%
Phillipsville	Humboldt	130	100.0%	0.0%	0.0%	0.0%	0.0%	0.0%
Philo	Mendocino	325	94.2%	2.5%	3.4%	0.0%	0.0%	80.0%
Phoenix Lake	Tuolumne	4,452	98.2%	0.6%	0.4%	0.6%	0.2%	9.5%
Pico Rivera	Los Angeles	63,004	61.8%	34.2%	2.8%	0.5%	0.8%	91.2%
Piedmont	Alameda	10,640	76.1%	3.4%	19.5%	0.9%	0.1%	3.9%
Pierpoint	Tulare	19	100.0%	0.0%	0.0%	0.0%	0.0%	0.0%
Pike	Sierra	174	88.5%	3.4%	0.0%	8.0%	0.0%	3.4%
Pine Canyon	Monterey	2,235	70.8%	18.8%	0.0%	0.0%	10.3%	50.5%
Pine Flat	Tulare	114	64.9%	35.1%	0.0%	0.0%	0.0%	0.0%
Pine Grove	Amador	2,573	93.0%	5.9%	1.1%	0.0%	0.0%	7.3%
Pine Hills	Humboldt	2,483	92.6%	6.2%	0.3%	0.4%	0.4%	3.1%
Pine Mountain Club	Kern	1,541	95.7%	2.4%	0.0%	1.0%	0.9%	15.0%
Pine Mountain Lake	Tuolumne	2,695	95.5%	2.3%	0.9%	0.0%	1.3%	6.8%
Pine Valley	San Diego	1,005	96.7%	3.3%	0.0%	0.0%	0.0%	4.8%
Pinole	Contra Costa	18,470	49.8%	16.8%	23.0%	10.1%	0.3%	21.7%
Piñon Hills	San Bernardino	6,130	93.4%	5.1%	0.4%	1.0%	0.0%	18.0%
Pioneer	Amador	1,226	82.1%	2.6%	0.0%	0.0%	15.3%	0.0%
Piru	Ventura	1,638	60.0%	39.9%	0.0%	0.2%	0.0%	83.6%
Pismo Beach	San Luis Obispo	7,753	87.6%	7.7%	2.8%	0.6%	1.3%	10.3%
Pittsburg	Contra Costa	62,528	40.6%	24.6%	15.1%	17.8%	1.9%	41.7%
Pixley	Tulare	2,957	74.5%	16.5%	2.6%	5.7%	0.7%	75.5%
Placentia	Orange	50,089	66.4%	16.6%	15.0%	1.6%	0.4%	38.2%
Placerville	El Dorado	10,394	82.5%	12.0%	2.0%	0.7%	2.9%	19.4%
Plainview	Tulare	1,101	58.0%	40.7%	0.0%	0.0%	1.3%	91.6%
Planada	Merced	4,366	52.3%	44.2%	1.2%	1.6%	0.8%	96.2%
Pleasant Hill	Contra Costa	33,045	75.4%	9.0%	13.5%	2.0%	0.2%	14.0%
Pleasanton	Alameda	69,220	68.0%	6.2%	22.9%	2.5%	0.4%	10.6%
Pleasure Point	Santa Cruz	5,195	84.3%	12.3%	2.1%	0.7%	0.7%	21.1%
Plumas Eureka	Plumas	164	100.0%	0.0%	0.0%	0.0%	0.0%	0.0%
Plumas Lake	Yuba	5,834	69.6%	13.5%	8.5%	7.3%	1.1%	14.4%
Plymouth	Amador	1,055	94.0%	3.2%	0.6%	0.0%	2.2%	11.7%
Point Arena	Mendocino	439	90.2%	9.8%	0.0%	0.0%	0.0%	43.5%
Point Reyes Station	Marin	853	61.9%	34.8%	0.0%	3.3%	0.0%	37.2%
Pollock Pines	El Dorado	6,953	95.2%	3.6%	0.8%	0.0%	0.4%	9.8%
Pomona	Los Angeles	148,946	54.3%	28.2%	8.1%	8.7%	0.8%	70.1%
Ponderosa	Tulare	52	100.0%	0.0%	0.0%	0.0%	0.0%	0.0%
Poplar-Cotton Center	Tulare	1,991	69.9%	7.8%	21.8%	0.0%	0.4%	61.9%
Port Costa	Contra Costa	274	90.5%	4.7%	4.7%	0.0%	0.0%	0.0%
Porterville	Tulare	53,531	72.8%	18.9%	5.1%	1.0%	2.2%	61.0%
Port Hueneme	Ventura	21,717	63.6%	19.5%	7.1%	5.1%	4.7%	51.3%
Portola	Plumas	3,069	87.0%	7.5%	0.6%	1.1%	3.8%	30.4%
Portola Valley	San Mateo	4,326	92.4%	1.5%	5.9%	0.0%	0.2%	6.2%
Posey	Tulare	6	100.0%	0.0%	0.0%	0.0%	0.0%	0.0%
Poso Park	Tulare	0	0.0%	0.0%	0.0%	0.0%	0.0%	0.0%
Potrero	San Diego	1,366	78.9%	21.1%	0.0%	0.0%	0.0%	84.6%
Potter Valley	Mendocino	835	83.0%	17.0%	0.0%	0.0%	0.0%	18.9%
Poway	San Diego	47,762	80.3%	8.9%	9.3%	1.4%	0.2%	16.3%
Prattville	Plumas	12	100.0%	0.0%	0.0%	0.0%	0.0%	0.0%
Princeton	Colusa	209	92.8%	2.9%	0.0%	0.0%	4.3%	7.7%
Proberta	Tehama	254	100.0%	0.0%	0.0%	0.0%	0.0%	0.0%
Prunedale	Monterey	18,938	80.0%	11.7%	5.5%	1.3%	1.4%	41.4%
Quartz Hill	Los Angeles	10,845	77.4%	8.5%	3.4%	9.4%	1.3%	22.6%
Quincy	Plumas	1,376	93.8%	0.0%	0.0%	3.4%	2.8%	7.7%
Rackerby	Butte	254	100.0%	0.0%	0.0%	0.0%	0.0%	3.5%
Rail Road Flat	Calaveras	410	82.2%	0.0%	0.0%	17.8%	0.0%	8.3%
Rainbow	San Diego	1,819	77.5%	20.6%	0.9%	0.3%	0.6%	36.1%
Raisin City	Fresno	272	34.2%	41.5%	0.0%	0.0%	24.3%	95.6%
Ramona	San Diego	21,673	85.5%	11.9%	1.2%	0.6%	0.8%	33.5%
Rancho Calaveras	Calaveras	5,997	88.8%	8.9%	0.4%	0.3%	1.6%	12.2%
Rancho Cordova	Sacramento	64,072	62.7%	14.3%	12.5%	8.8%	1.7%	20.1%
Rancho Cucamonga	San Bernardino	163,151	63.2%	16.4%	10.5%	8.4%	1.5%	34.8%
Rancho Mirage	Riverside	17,022	91.2%	4.1%	1.3%	2.4%	1.0%	11.2%
Rancho Murieta	Sacramento	6,376	86.0%	4.8%	4.9%	4.2%	0.0%	6.0%
Rancho Palos Verdes	Los Angeles	41,575	61.1%	6.3%	29.1%	3.0%	0.5%	8.1%
Rancho San Diego	San Diego	21,495	82.4%	7.7%	4.7%	5.1%	0.1%	15.2%
Rancho Santa Fe	San Diego	3,128	93.9%	3.6%	1.9%	0.0%	0.6%	6.2%
Rancho Santa Margarita	Orange	47,769	78.0%	9.5%	10.6%	1.4%	0.5%	16.9%
Rancho Tehama	Tehama	1,356	82.4%	17.6%	0.0%	0.0%	0.0%	16.2%
Randsburg	Kern	26	100.0%	0.0%	0.0%	0.0%	0.0%	0.0%
Red Bluff	Tehama	14,026	89.3%	7.4%	0.9%	0.4%	2.0%	21.2%
Red Corral	Amador	1,757	84.4%	11.8%	2.3%	0.2%	1.4%	2.9%
Redcrest	Humboldt	53	100.0%	0.0%	0.0%	0.0%	0.0%	0.0%
Redding	Shasta	89,674	87.6%	6.3%	2.8%	1.1%	2.2%	8.7%
Redlands	San Bernardino	68,995	69.6%	15.9%	7.9%	5.3%	1.3%	29.5%
Redondo Beach	Los Angeles	66,397	76.9%	8.3%	11.3%	2.9%	0.6%	16.2%
Redway	Humboldt	953	96.2%	0.0%	0.0%	0.0%	3.8%	0.0%
Redwood City	San Mateo	76,031	75.0%	10.3%	10.6%	2.7%	1.3%	37.3%
Redwood Valley	Mendocino	1,378	100.0%	0.0%	0.0%	0.0%	0.0%	2.5%
Reedley	Fresno	23,968	62.1%	33.7%	3.0%	0.7%	0.4%	75.9%
Reliez Valley	Contra Costa	3,141	85.6%	4.2%	9.7%	0.5%	0.0%	11.2%
Rialto	San Bernardino	99,501	59.2%	22.5%	2.4%	14.9%	0.9%	67.2%
Richfield	Tehama	243	88.9%	3.3%	3.7%	0.0%	4.1%	0.8%
Richgrove	Tulare	2,592	56.2%	41.6%	2.3%	0.0%	0.0%	97.3%
Richmond	Contra Costa	103,161	43.8%	14.4%	14.7%	26.5%	0.6%	37.9%
Richvale	Butte	155	83.9%	16.1%	0.0%	0.0%	0.0%	16.1%
Ridgecrest	Kern	27,587	77.7%	11.2%	4.1%	5.6%	1.4%	14.6%
Ridgemark	San Benito	3,370	86.3%	7.9%	2.8%	2.2%	0.8%	21.5%
Rio Dell	Humboldt	3,342	83.9%	9.7%	1.5%	1.9%	3.0%	15.7%
Rio del Mar	Santa Cruz	9,200	94.1%	3.0%	2.0%	0.8%	0.1%	7.8%
Rio Linda	Sacramento	14,366	76.1%	14.0%	5.7%	3.7%	0.6%	18.8%
Rio Oso	Sutter	349	100.0%	0.0%	0.0%	0.0%	0.0%	15.2%
Rio Vista	Solano	7,088	76.5%	10.0%	4.0%	7.9%	1.5%	14.9%
Ripley	Riverside	706	45.6%	45.2%	0.0%	9.2%	0.0%	87.1%
Ripon	San Joaquin	14,021	86.7%	5.4%	5.4%	1.6%	1.0%	20.7%
Riverbank	Stanislaus	22,198	77.5%	13.7%	4.1%	3.7%	1.1%	51.9%
Riverdale	Fresno	3,633	58.1%	37.3%	2.9%	1.5%	0.2%	68.2%
Riverdale Park	Stanislaus	1,243	81.6%	18.3%	0.0%	0.2%	0.0%	70.0%
River Pines	Amador	578	97.1%	0.0%	2.9%	0.0%	0.0%	6.9%
Riverside	Riverside	303,569	65.1%	20.2%	6.9%	6.6%	1.2%	49.4%
Robbins	Sutter	285	82.1%	16.5%	0.0%	0.0%	1.4%	54.0%
Robinson Mill	Butte	136	84.6%	15.4%	0.0%	0.0%	0.0%	15.4%
Rocklin	Placer	55,713	83.1%	6.0%	8.2%	1.7%	1.1%	10.5%
Rodeo	Contra Costa	8,786	50.1%	12.3%	22.8%	14.2%	0.5%	21.4%
Rodriguez Camp	Tulare	205	51.2%	21.5%	0.0%	0.0%	27.3%	100.0%
Rohnert Park	Sonoma	40,741	78.6%	11.5%	6.6%	2.0%	1.4%	23.3%
Rolling Hills	Los Angeles	1,790	69.3%	7.0%	21.4%	1.5%	0.8%	6.4%
Rolling Hills	Madera	927	88.2%	4.5%	6.8%	0.4%	0.0%	8.8%
Rolling Hills Estates	Los Angeles	8,040	66.1%	4.3%	23.6%	5.6%	0.5%	4.2%
Rollingwood	Contra Costa	2,790	53.3%	17.0%	25.2%	3.0%	1.5%	57.8%
Romoland	Riverside	1,604	78.1%	9.9%	0.0%	12.0%	0.0%	21.9%
Rosamond	Kern	17,997	62.8%	22.6%	3.3%	9.7%	1.6%	37.8%
Rosedale	Kern	14,765	88.1%	7.5%	1.5%	1.3%	1.6%	21.8%
Rose Hills	Los Angeles	2,977	62.7%	23.1%	11.6%	2.6%	0.0%	54.8%
Roseland	Sonoma	6,628	67.6%	27.1%	2.9%	1.8%	0.5%	58.5%
Rosemead	Los Angeles	53,725	21.8%	15.8%	60.8%	0.6%	0.9%	31.9%
Rosemont	Sacramento	23,020	62.7%	14.1%	10.1%	12.1%	1.0%	21.6%
Roseville	Placer	116,613	81.4%	7.7%	8.4%	1.7%	0.8%	15.1%
Ross	Marin	2,079	95.5%	2.6%	1.5%	0.0%	0.4%	4.7%
Rossmoor	Orange	10,099	88.0%	3.3%	8.1%	0.4%	0.2%	8.9%
Rough and Ready	Nevada	891	98.0%	1.0%	1.0%	0.0%	0.0%	0.0%
Round Mountain	Shasta	124	81.5%	0.0%	0.0%	0.0%	18.5%	0.0%
Round Valley	Inyo	396	87.4%	4.5%	0.5%	0.0%	7.6%	14.6%
Rouse	Stanislaus	1,437	61.7%	23.4%	12.2%	2.7%	0.0%	70.4%
Rowland Heights	Los Angeles	50,663	22.1%	17.9%	58.2%	1.2%	0.6%	28.7%
Rubidoux	Riverside	37,874	46.9%	42.0%	3.5%	5.8%	1.8%	68.7%
Running Springs	San Bernardino	5,027	84.4%	11.2%	0.9%	0.4%	3.1%	17.6%
Ruth	Trinity	144	100.0%	0.0%	0.0%	0.0%	0.0%	0.0%
Rutherford	Napa	161	100.0%	0.0%	0.0%	0.0%	0.0%	26.7%
Sacramento	Sacramento	463,537	49.3%	15.2%	19.1%	13.9%	2.5%	26.0%
St. Helena	Napa	5,838	85.5%	8.7%	2.8%	1.7%	1.4%	25.1%
Salida	Stanislaus	15,156	80.6%	10.8%	5.1%	2.9%	0.6%	42.8%
Salinas	Monterey	148,780	68.6%	22.7%	6.4%	1.7%	0.6%	75.1%
Salmon Creek	Sonoma	95	93.7%	0.0%	0.0%	0.0%	6.3%	0.0%
Salton City	Imperial	2,338	77.2%	20.0%	0.0%	2.8%	0.0%	47.9%
Salton Sea Beach	Imperial	598	63.0%	10.2%	1.8%	0.0%	24.9%	53.8%
Samoa	Humboldt	364	78.8%	16.2%	0.0%	0.3%	4.7%	29.1%
San Andreas	Calaveras	2,941	92.0%	5.4%	0.5%	1.3%	0.8%	16.1%
San Anselmo	Marin	12,273	86.4%	7.0%	5.1%	1.3%	0.1%	6.6%
San Antonio Heights	San Bernardino	3,914	74.0%	18.0%	7.1%	0.1%	0.8%	21.5%
San Ardo	Monterey	591	66.7%	32.5%	0.0%	0.0%	0.8%	85.3%
San Bernardino	San Bernardino	210,100	44.8%	34.9%	4.4%	14.9%	1.1%	58.8%
San Bruno	San Mateo	40,677	52.9%	14.6%	26.3%	2.4%	3.8%	28.0%
San Buenaventura (Ventura)	Ventura	105,809	73.4%	21.0%	3.2%	1.4%	1.0%	32.8%
San Carlos	San Mateo	28,130	82.1%	6.7%	10.3%	0.5%	0.3%	9.0%
San Clemente	Orange	62,052	83.4%	10.7%	4.6%	0.6%	0.8%	14.8%
Sand City	Monterey	292	75.7%	19.5%	2.4%	2.4%	0.0%	38.4%
San Diego	San Diego	1,296,437	65.8%	10.6%	15.8%	6.8%	1.0%	28.2%
San Diego Country Estates	San Diego	10,392	91.1%	4.6%	1.5%	1.5%	1.3%	11.0%
San Dimas	Los Angeles	33,523	70.4%	14.4%	11.9%	2.8%	0.5%	26.1%
San Fernando	Los Angeles	23,638	66.0%	32.1%	0.9%	0.4%	0.7%	90.7%
San Francisco	San Francisco	797,983	51.2%	8.2%	33.5%	6.2%	0.9%	14.9%
San Gabriel	Los Angeles	39,703	26.8%	11.7%	59.8%	0.9%	0.9%	26.3%
Sanger	Fresno	23,814	62.5%	29.8%	4.3%	2.8%	0.5%	76.6%
San Geronimo	Marin	383	93.5%	0.0%	1.3%	5.2%	0.0%	0.0%
San Jacinto	Riverside	42,722	61.4%	26.4%	5.1%	4.7%	2.5%	53.4%
San Joaquin	Fresno	3,965	96.7%	3.0%	0.3%	0.0%	0.0%	97.0%
San Jose	Santa Clara	939,688	47.6%	16.2%	32.1%	3.0%	1.0%	33.0%
San Juan Bautista	San Benito	1,619	83.8%	6.4%	4.1%	4.4%	1.4%	37.6%
San Juan Capistrano	Orange	34,455	70.6%	25.3%	3.3%	0.3%	0.5%	37.7%
San Leandro	Alameda	83,877	44.9%	10.2%	29.6%	13.4%	1.9%	26.0%
San Lorenzo	Alameda	24,096	54.1%	17.2%	20.8%	6.5%	1.4%	35.9%
San Lucas	Monterey	242	69.4%	26.4%	0.0%	4.1%	0.0%	96.3%
San Luis Obispo	San Luis Obispo	45,130	83.2%	8.4%	6.4%	1.6%	0.6%	16.6%
San Marcos	San Diego	80,709	75.2%	12.1%	8.9%	3.1%	0.7%	36.6%
San Marino	Los Angeles	13,131	43.7%	4.3%	51.9%	0.0%	0.1%	6.5%
San Martin	Santa Clara	6,799	66.8%	21.0%	10.5%	0.8%	0.9%	39.3%
San Mateo	San Mateo	95,957	65.3%	10.4%	19.8%	2.3%	2.1%	25.0%
San Miguel (Contra Costa County)	Contra Costa	3,382	92.9%	1.7%	4.3%	0.9%	0.1%	2.4%
San Miguel (San Luis Obispo County)	San Luis Obispo	2,782	64.6%	29.6%	1.3%	0.0%	4.6%	50.8%
San Pablo	Contra Costa	29,224	53.7%	14.4%	15.9%	14.7%	1.3%	55.8%
San Pasqual	Los Angeles	2,111	71.2%	2.7%	22.9%	3.2%	0.0%	7.9%
San Rafael	Marin	57,374	72.1%	17.9%	6.3%	2.8%	0.9%	28.4%
San Ramon	Contra Costa	69,241	53.4%	7.8%	35.9%	2.3%	0.5%	9.9%
San Simeon	San Luis Obispo	571	48.0%	52.0%	0.0%	0.0%	0.0%	72.5%
Santa Ana	Orange	325,517	42.1%	46.0%	10.1%	1.2%	0.7%	78.7%
Santa Barbara	Santa Barbara	88,192	74.8%	18.6%	3.8%	1.9%	0.9%	38.4%
Santa Clara	Santa Clara	114,482	46.0%	12.0%	38.2%	2.5%	1.3%	19.4%
Santa Clarita	Los Angeles	210,480	72.6%	15.5%	9.0%	2.4%	0.4%	29.8%
Santa Cruz	Santa Cruz	59,022	81.8%	8.4%	6.4%	2.4%	1.0%	18.1%
Santa Fe Springs	Los Angeles	16,333	62.0%	30.6%	2.4%	3.6%	1.4%	80.9%
Santa Margarita	San Luis Obispo	1,429	95.7%	4.3%	0.0%	0.0%	0.0%	18.0%
Santa Maria	Santa Barbara	96,803	78.6%	13.8%	5.4%	1.3%	0.9%	70.1%
Santa Monica	Los Angeles	89,153	77.9%	8.2%	9.9%	3.8%	0.3%	12.1%
Santa Nella	Merced	1,292	84.1%	12.0%	0.0%	3.9%	0.0%	70.4%
Santa Paula	Ventura	29,248	53.0%	45.5%	0.6%	0.2%	0.7%	78.8%
Santa Rosa	Sonoma	164,976	78.2%	12.5%	5.1%	2.3%	1.9%	28.2%
Santa Rosa Valley	Ventura	3,143	91.8%	3.3%	4.9%	0.0%	0.0%	6.5%
Santa Susana	Ventura	1,115	92.4%	4.8%	0.0%	2.8%	0.0%	8.1%
Santa Venetia	Marin	4,799	85.3%	10.3%	3.8%	0.0%	0.6%	16.9%
Santa Ynez	Santa Barbara	5,018	81.0%	10.9%	0.3%	0.5%	7.3%	18.8%
Santee	San Diego	53,302	85.6%	8.9%	3.4%	1.4%	0.8%	16.5%
Saranap	Contra Costa	4,486	85.2%	3.8%	5.8%	5.1%	0.0%	6.4%
Saratoga	Santa Clara	29,781	51.8%	3.6%	44.0%	0.5%	0.1%	3.0%
Saticoy	Ventura	851	59.3%	36.3%	0.0%	0.0%	4.3%	74.7%
Sattley	Sierra	28	100.0%	0.0%	0.0%	0.0%	0.0%	0.0%
Sausalito	Marin	7,047	93.4%	1.7%	4.8%	0.0%	0.1%	4.6%
Scotia	Humboldt	863	78.6%	13.4%	0.0%	7.2%	0.8%	11.5%
Scotts Valley	Santa Cruz	11,480	83.4%	7.7%	7.2%	1.0%	0.9%	8.9%
Seacliff	Santa Cruz	3,141	84.3%	8.2%	6.4%	1.0%	0.1%	27.2%
Seal Beach	Orange	24,157	83.2%	6.2%	9.6%	0.5%	0.5%	10.6%
Sea Ranch	Sonoma	812	97.9%	0.7%	1.4%	0.0%	0.0%	7.4%
Searles Valley	San Bernardino	1,812	91.9%	5.0%	0.0%	2.2%	0.8%	9.9%
Seaside	Monterey	32,735	58.9%	20.8%	8.5%	9.1%	2.7%	40.3%
Sebastopol	Sonoma	7,359	88.8%	6.8%	1.2%	0.7%	2.5%	10.8%
Seeley	Imperial	1,683	79.8%	17.8%	0.0%	2.4%	0.0%	79.1%
Selma	Fresno	22,939	58.1%	35.2%	4.2%	1.7%	0.8%	79.7%
Sequoia Crest	Tulare	28	100.0%	0.0%	0.0%	0.0%	0.0%	0.0%
Sereno del Mar	Sonoma	119	100.0%	0.0%	0.0%	0.0%	0.0%	0.0%
Seville	Tulare	732	81.8%	17.5%	0.0%	0.0%	0.7%	98.0%
Shackelford	Stanislaus	2,829	68.8%	22.1%	0.7%	4.9%	3.4%	71.4%
Shafter	Kern	16,709	76.7%	20.7%	0.1%	0.6%	1.9%	80.0%
Shandon	San Luis Obispo	1,150	82.3%	6.9%	0.0%	10.6%	0.3%	46.1%
Shasta	Shasta	1,576	92.4%	2.9%	2.6%	0.0%	2.2%	11.4%
Shasta Lake	Shasta	10,121	87.6%	5.6%	4.2%	0.4%	2.2%	6.1%
Shaver Lake	Fresno	710	98.2%	0.8%	1.0%	0.0%	0.0%	8.5%
Shell Ridge	Contra Costa	1,123	80.1%	10.2%	9.7%	0.0%	0.0%	19.0%
Shelter Cove	Humboldt	508	100.0%	0.0%	0.0%	0.0%	0.0%	1.0%
Sheridan	Placer	1,444	85.9%	6.8%	0.0%	0.0%	7.3%	13.8%
Shingle Springs	El Dorado	4,797	92.7%	2.0%	0.0%	0.7%	4.6%	16.7%
Shingletown	Shasta	2,240	85.8%	4.6%	3.7%	1.2%	4.6%	0.5%
Shoshone	Inyo	36	94.4%	0.0%	0.0%	0.0%	5.6%	8.3%
Sierra Brooks	Sierra	237	100.0%	0.0%	0.0%	0.0%	0.0%	0.0%
Sierra City	Sierra	279	96.8%	3.2%	0.0%	0.0%	0.0%	0.0%
Sierra Madre	Los Angeles	10,881	77.7%	12.8%	8.0%	1.5%	0.0%	15.5%
Sierra Village	Tuolumne	209	100.0%	0.0%	0.0%	0.0%	0.0%	0.0%
Sierraville	Sierra	229	49.3%	45.9%	0.0%	4.8%	0.0%	45.9%
Signal Hill	Los Angeles	10,842	40.4%	20.6%	24.1%	13.1%	1.8%	33.3%
Silverado Resort	Napa	1,199	90.2%	5.7%	4.1%	0.0%	0.0%	0.0%
Silver City	Tulare	0	0.0%	0.0%	0.0%	0.0%	0.0%	0.0%
Silver Lakes	San Bernardino	4,508	88.1%	4.3%	3.7%	3.2%	0.7%	14.2%
Simi Valley	Ventura	122,864	74.8%	14.3%	8.8%	1.2%	0.9%	24.3%
Sisquoc	Santa Barbara	211	56.4%	26.5%	0.0%	0.0%	17.1%	44.5%
Sky Valley	Riverside	2,021	75.0%	23.8%	1.1%	0.0%	0.0%	40.3%
Sleepy Hollow	Marin	2,277	93.6%	3.2%	3.2%	0.0%	0.0%	3.0%
Smartsville	Yuba	196	99.0%	1.0%	0.0%	0.0%	0.0%	1.5%
Smith Corner	Kern	275	86.2%	13.8%	0.0%	0.0%	0.0%	85.8%
Smith River	Del Norte	649	80.4%	18.2%	1.4%	0.0%	0.0%	13.6%
Snelling	Merced	97	100.0%	0.0%	0.0%	0.0%	0.0%	3.1%
Soda Bay	Lake	874	94.6%	4.3%	0.0%	1.0%	0.0%	17.0%
Soda Springs	Nevada	126	100.0%	0.0%	0.0%	0.0%	0.0%	0.0%
Solana Beach	San Diego	12,864	86.1%	6.7%	4.0%	2.7%	0.5%	16.8%
Soledad	Monterey	25,548	66.6%	17.0%	2.7%	12.0%	1.7%	69.4%
Solvang	Santa Barbara	5,237	91.0%	5.3%	1.1%	0.1%	2.6%	20.1%
Sonoma	Sonoma	10,430	87.5%	8.0%	2.1%	0.4%	1.9%	16.6%
Sonora	Tuolumne	4,899	93.2%	3.4%	1.0%	1.4%	0.9%	5.1%
Soquel	Santa Cruz	9,474	85.2%	10.4%	4.1%	0.0%	0.3%	17.6%
Soulsbyville	Tuolumne	2,008	99.0%	0.0%	0.7%	0.0%	0.3%	1.7%
South Dos Palos	Merced	2,144	88.9%	10.0%	0.0%	1.1%	0.0%	94.1%
South El Monte	Los Angeles	20,197	63.6%	24.5%	10.7%	0.1%	1.1%	85.7%
South Gate	Los Angeles	94,586	46.6%	51.4%	1.0%	0.5%	0.4%	95.3%
South Lake Tahoe	El Dorado	21,814	76.8%	16.8%	4.5%	0.6%	1.3%	31.3%
South Monrovia Island	Los Angeles	6,043	50.4%	37.7%	4.5%	7.2%	0.2%	74.3%
South Oroville	Butte	5,982	63.9%	7.8%	17.3%	8.3%	2.7%	15.2%
South Pasadena	Los Angeles	25,465	57.7%	9.0%	30.8%	2.0%	0.4%	21.0%
South San Francisco	San Mateo	62,822	41.5%	16.8%	35.9%	2.4%	3.5%	33.7%
South San Gabriel	Los Angeles	7,872	23.9%	19.9%	54.5%	0.8%	0.9%	38.5%
South San Jose Hills	Los Angeles	20,442	71.8%	18.1%	9.1%	0.6%	0.4%	85.5%
South Taft	Kern	2,279	85.7%	9.3%	0.5%	2.1%	2.4%	46.0%
South Whittier	Los Angeles	58,012	51.9%	42.2%	4.1%	0.8%	1.0%	77.3%
Spaulding	Lassen	137	94.9%	0.0%	0.0%	0.0%	5.1%	0.0%
Spreckels	Monterey	803	87.9%	9.7%	0.0%	1.5%	0.9%	14.3%
Spring Garden	Plumas	0	0.0%	0.0%	0.0%	0.0%	0.0%	0.0%
Spring Valley (Lake County)	Lake	1,120	97.1%	1.0%	0.0%	1.9%	0.0%	4.6%
Spring Valley (San Diego County)	San Diego	27,827	74.4%	9.3%	4.4%	10.4%	1.5%	29.2%
Spring Valley Lake	San Bernardino	8,080	91.3%	5.4%	1.9%	1.0%	0.3%	21.1%
Springville	Tulare	1,071	75.2%	24.0%	0.0%	0.0%	0.8%	27.8%
Squaw Valley	Fresno	1,900	93.8%	4.9%	0.8%	0.0%	0.4%	16.8%
Squirrel Mountain Valley	Kern	635	100.0%	0.0%	0.0%	0.0%	0.0%	6.0%
Stallion Springs	Kern	3,244	90.7%	9.3%	0.0%	0.0%	0.0%	7.8%
Stanford	Santa Clara	13,416	59.9%	8.3%	26.2%	4.6%	1.0%	12.2%
Stanton	Orange	38,141	44.4%	29.5%	22.0%	2.8%	1.3%	47.7%
Stevenson Ranch	Los Angeles	17,116	65.9%	6.7%	23.5%	3.8%	0.2%	13.5%
Stevinson	Merced	132	53.8%	46.2%	0.0%	0.0%	0.0%	46.2%
Stinson Beach	Marin	448	86.4%	6.7%	6.9%	0.0%	0.0%	6.7%
Stirling City	Butte	271	100.0%	0.0%	0.0%	0.0%	0.0%	0.0%
Stockton	San Joaquin	289,926	45.6%	19.1%	21.8%	12.0%	1.6%	40.0%
Stonyford	Colusa	104	99.0%	0.0%	0.0%	1.0%	0.0%	0.0%
Storrie	Plumas	0	0.0%	0.0%	0.0%	0.0%	0.0%	0.0%
Stratford	Kings	1,436	68.7%	30.6%	0.0%	0.7%	0.0%	91.9%
Strathmore	Tulare	3,758	78.1%	21.9%	0.0%	0.0%	0.0%	85.5%
Strawberry (Marin County)	Marin	5,765	75.1%	8.2%	11.3%	4.9%	0.5%	6.1%
Strawberry (Tuolumne County)	Tuolumne	168	100.0%	0.0%	0.0%	0.0%	0.0%	0.0%
Sugarloaf Mountain Park	Tulare	0	0.0%	0.0%	0.0%	0.0%	0.0%	0.0%
Sugarloaf Saw Mill	Tulare	0	0.0%	0.0%	0.0%	0.0%	0.0%	0.0%
Sugarloaf Village	Tulare	15	100.0%	0.0%	0.0%	0.0%	0.0%	0.0%
Suisun City	Solano	27,900	34.4%	24.9%	19.9%	19.7%	1.1%	25.6%
Sultana	Tulare	391	73.1%	26.9%	0.0%	0.0%	0.0%	64.5%
Summerland	Santa Barbara	1,381	80.4%	9.0%	10.6%	0.0%	0.0%	3.1%
Sunnyside	Fresno	4,586	54.5%	20.6%	17.1%	6.0%	1.8%	37.3%
Sunnyside-Tahoe City	Placer	1,667	95.4%	2.8%	0.0%	1.7%	0.0%	15.6%
Sunnyslope	Riverside	4,919	51.7%	40.8%	6.6%	0.9%	0.0%	65.1%
Sunny Slopes	Mono	149	100.0%	0.0%	0.0%	0.0%	0.0%	0.0%
Sunnyvale	Santa Clara	138,436	44.6%	12.3%	40.6%	1.8%	0.8%	17.8%
Sunol	Alameda	760	84.3%	11.6%	4.1%	0.0%	0.0%	15.8%
Sunset Beach	Orange	1,486	87.7%	5.1%	2.7%	4.5%	0.0%	5.5%
Sun Village	Los Angeles	11,165	42.7%	50.2%	0.4%	6.4%	0.3%	66.5%
Susanville	Lassen	17,728	65.0%	17.3%	1.5%	10.7%	5.5%	19.9%
Sutter	Sutter	2,892	88.1%	9.2%	0.2%	0.6%	1.8%	9.0%
Sutter Creek	Amador	2,497	93.4%	1.5%	4.8%	0.0%	0.3%	5.3%
Swall Meadows	Mono	461	100.0%	0.0%	0.0%	0.0%	0.0%	0.0%
Taft	Kern	9,413	86.7%	8.5%	2.3%	1.6%	0.9%	31.5%
Taft Heights	Kern	1,873	88.3%	5.2%	2.2%	0.7%	3.6%	5.1%
Taft Mosswood	San Joaquin	1,406	30.4%	30.4%	16.1%	21.4%	1.6%	65.0%
Tahoe Vista	Placer	1,376	86.4%	9.4%	4.1%	0.0%	0.0%	42.5%
Tahoma	El Dorado; Placer	924	89.5%	10.5%	0.0%	0.0%	0.0%	9.2%
Talmage	Mendocino	974	67.1%	15.4%	14.6%	1.2%	1.6%	25.7%
Tamalpais-Homestead Valley	Marin	10,538	85.4%	5.0%	8.7%	0.8%	0.1%	3.9%
Tara Hills	Contra Costa	4,565	59.6%	13.2%	10.5%	14.9%	1.8%	37.3%
Tarpey Village	Fresno	3,714	71.7%	19.9%	4.3%	3.4%	0.7%	25.7%
Taylorsville	Plumas	92	100.0%	0.0%	0.0%	0.0%	0.0%	34.8%
Tecopa	Inyo	98	100.0%	0.0%	0.0%	0.0%	0.0%	5.1%
Tehachapi	Kern	14,332	82.4%	7.3%	0.7%	7.9%	1.6%	32.8%
Tehama	Tehama	383	85.9%	12.5%	0.0%	0.0%	1.6%	13.3%
Temecula	Riverside	98,189	72.2%	12.2%	9.5%	3.7%	2.4%	25.2%
Temelec	Sonoma	1,510	97.3%	1.7%	1.1%	0.0%	0.0%	10.2%
Temescal Valley	Riverside	23,288	74.6%	10.0%	9.9%	4.4%	1.1%	30.4%
Temple City	Los Angeles	35,372	32.1%	10.4%	56.8%	0.4%	0.2%	17.0%
Templeton	San Luis Obispo	7,645	88.9%	9.5%	0.7%	0.5%	0.4%	16.4%
Tennant	Siskiyou	55	65.5%	5.5%	29.1%	0.0%	0.0%	0.0%
Terminous	San Joaquin	367	93.7%	6.3%	0.0%	0.0%	0.0%	0.0%
Terra Bella	Tulare	3,299	59.3%	39.9%	0.7%	0.0%	0.2%	90.7%
Teviston	Tulare	1,217	87.9%	2.1%	1.7%	7.3%	1.0%	84.1%
Thermal	Riverside	3,372	57.1%	39.7%	0.0%	3.2%	0.0%	94.7%
Thermalito	Butte	6,295	80.2%	5.9%	10.8%	1.3%	1.7%	12.7%
Thornton	San Joaquin	783	73.1%	24.8%	1.0%	0.8%	0.4%	67.4%
Thousand Oaks	Ventura	125,633	79.6%	9.1%	9.8%	1.1%	0.4%	16.0%
Thousand Palms	Riverside	7,578	65.5%	30.8%	0.7%	1.6%	1.3%	60.9%
Three Rivers	Tulare	2,155	95.1%	2.9%	1.1%	0.4%	0.5%	6.3%
Three Rocks	Fresno	159	94.3%	5.7%	0.0%	0.0%	0.0%	100.0%
Tiburon	Marin	8,895	91.5%	3.3%	4.4%	0.4%	0.3%	7.0%
Timber Cove	Sonoma	165	100.0%	0.0%	0.0%	0.0%	0.0%	13.9%
Tipton	Tulare	2,050	90.3%	9.3%	0.0%	0.1%	0.2%	79.5%
Tobin	Plumas	0	0.0%	0.0%	0.0%	0.0%	0.0%	0.0%
Tomales	Marin	271	70.1%	18.5%	11.4%	0.0%	0.0%	11.1%
Tonyville	Tulare	299	70.6%	17.1%	0.0%	0.0%	12.4%	100.0%
Tooleville	Tulare	129	91.5%	8.5%	0.0%	0.0%	0.0%	65.1%
Topanga	Los Angeles	9,065	88.9%	4.8%	2.4%	3.6%	0.2%	8.8%
Topaz	Mono	75	100.0%	0.0%	0.0%	0.0%	0.0%	0.0%
Toro Canyon	Santa Barbara	1,205	92.9%	2.1%	5.0%	0.0%	0.0%	2.5%
Torrance	Los Angeles	144,622	50.5%	11.5%	34.7%	2.9%	0.4%	16.6%
Tracy	San Joaquin	81,115	53.9%	22.5%	16.0%	6.3%	1.4%	38.0%
Tranquillity	Fresno	1,180	89.5%	0.0%	0.0%	0.0%	10.5%	83.9%
Traver	Tulare	1,046	83.1%	14.0%	1.7%	0.0%	1.2%	87.1%
Tres Pinos	San Benito	313	97.8%	2.2%	0.0%	0.0%	0.0%	32.6%
Trinidad	Humboldt	286	95.5%	2.4%	0.0%	0.0%	2.1%	1.7%
Trinity Center	Trinity	173	100.0%	0.0%	0.0%	0.0%	0.0%	0.0%
Trinity Village	Trinity	163	100.0%	0.0%	0.0%	0.0%	0.0%	0.0%
Trona	Inyo	0	0.0%	0.0%	0.0%	0.0%	0.0%	0.0%
Trowbridge	Sutter	112	95.5%	4.5%	0.0%	0.0%	0.0%	0.0%
Truckee	Nevada	16,009	91.0%	6.0%	1.9%	0.4%	0.7%	18.0%
Tulare	Tulare	58,150	78.7%	12.9%	2.5%	4.7%	1.2%	56.6%
Tulelake	Siskiyou	981	83.1%	8.1%	1.0%	5.2%	2.7%	55.2%
Tuolumne City	Tuolumne	2,152	88.6%	11.2%	0.1%	0.0%	0.1%	10.2%
Tupman	Kern	102	73.5%	20.6%	0.0%	0.0%	5.9%	11.8%
Turlock	Stanislaus	67,953	78.1%	12.3%	6.3%	2.0%	1.3%	34.7%
Tustin	Orange	74,625	56.6%	19.5%	20.8%	2.0%	1.1%	37.9%
Tuttle	Merced	21	100.0%	0.0%	0.0%	0.0%	0.0%	0.0%
Tuttletown	Tuolumne	903	100.0%	0.0%	0.0%	0.0%	0.0%	0.0%
Twain	Plumas	50	100.0%	0.0%	0.0%	0.0%	0.0%	0.0%
Twain Harte	Tuolumne	2,151	91.7%	5.8%	1.2%	0.0%	1.3%	13.0%
Twentynine Palms	San Bernardino	25,786	74.8%	10.1%	3.6%	7.4%	4.1%	19.8%
Twin Lakes	Santa Cruz	5,023	84.8%	8.8%	3.2%	2.6%	0.6%	16.3%
Ukiah	Mendocino	15,979	81.6%	9.8%	2.0%	2.7%	3.9%	27.8%
Union City	Alameda	68,830	21.5%	17.8%	53.3%	6.2%	1.2%	21.5%
University of California, Davis	Yolo	6,805	43.6%	10.8%	41.2%	1.6%	2.8%	13.9%
University of California, Merced	Merced	0	0.0%	0.0%	0.0%	0.0%	0.0%	0.0%
Upland	San Bernardino	74,021	61.0%	22.5%	9.3%	5.5%	1.8%	37.8%
Upper Lake	Lake	939	80.1%	15.0%	1.2%	0.0%	3.7%	25.2%
Vacaville	Solano	92,217	64.8%	17.0%	5.9%	11.1%	1.2%	21.7%
Valinda	Los Angeles	22,326	58.8%	27.3%	12.3%	1.4%	0.2%	79.0%
Vallecito	Calaveras	841	100.0%	0.0%	0.0%	0.0%	0.0%	3.6%
Vallejo	Solano	116,021	36.2%	17.2%	23.9%	21.0%	1.6%	23.3%
Valle Vista	Riverside	14,579	77.0%	13.8%	2.3%	3.5%	3.4%	26.2%
Valley Acres	Kern	651	99.2%	0.8%	0.0%	0.0%	0.0%	23.5%
Valley Center	San Diego	9,381	75.9%	14.0%	7.4%	0.8%	2.0%	27.4%
Valley Ford	Sonoma	85	100.0%	0.0%	0.0%	0.0%	0.0%	43.5%
Valley Home	Stanislaus	327	93.3%	5.8%	0.9%	0.0%	0.0%	4.6%
Valley Ranch	Plumas	150	100.0%	0.0%	0.0%	0.0%	0.0%	0.0%
Valley Springs	Calaveras	4,196	92.3%	2.8%	4.9%	0.0%	0.0%	20.8%
Valley Wells	Inyo	0	0.0%	0.0%	0.0%	0.0%	0.0%	0.0%
Val Verde	Los Angeles	2,325	71.1%	22.6%	2.5%	3.7%	0.0%	66.1%
Vandenberg AFB	Santa Barbara	3,886	66.3%	18.0%	4.9%	8.3%	2.4%	19.0%
Vandenberg Village	Santa Barbara	6,797	85.5%	8.6%	2.8%	1.7%	1.4%	15.0%
Verdi	Sierra	158	100.0%	0.0%	0.0%	0.0%	0.0%	0.0%
Vernon	Los Angeles	64	37.5%	48.4%	10.9%	0.0%	3.1%	70.3%
Victor	San Joaquin	244	93.4%	6.6%	0.0%	0.0%	0.0%	21.7%
Victorville	San Bernardino	111,704	62.0%	17.1%	4.5%	15.4%	1.1%	47.5%
View Park-Windsor Hills	Los Angeles	10,814	6.7%	6.2%	1.8%	83.8%	1.5%	3.7%
Villa Park	Orange	5,825	76.1%	8.4%	15.3%	0.1%	0.0%	8.1%
Vina	Tehama	107	93.5%	0.0%	0.0%	0.0%	6.5%	15.0%
Vincent	Los Angeles	16,736	42.0%	47.9%	6.8%	3.1%	0.2%	71.7%
Vine Hill	Contra Costa	3,620	69.7%	11.9%	8.6%	7.3%	2.4%	31.7%
Vineyard	Sacramento	25,993	47.3%	10.3%	28.2%	12.3%	1.9%	15.1%
Visalia	Tulare	121,882	80.6%	10.6%	5.4%	2.3%	1.2%	44.1%
Vista	San Diego	93,293	75.1%	17.0%	4.0%	2.8%	1.0%	47.3%
Vista Santa Rosa	Riverside	2,973	60.1%	34.2%	0.5%	0.0%	5.2%	78.5%
Volcano	Amador	183	100.0%	0.0%	0.0%	0.0%	0.0%	0.0%
Volta	Merced	126	100.0%	0.0%	0.0%	0.0%	0.0%	55.6%
Walker	Mono	750	79.6%	13.2%	0.0%	0.0%	7.2%	10.7%
Wallace	Calaveras	131	100.0%	0.0%	0.0%	0.0%	0.0%	0.0%
Walnut	Los Angeles	29,269	21.7%	10.5%	64.8%	2.7%	0.2%	17.6%
Walnut Creek	Contra Costa	64,168	80.7%	4.7%	12.0%	2.3%	0.3%	10.2%
Walnut Grove	Sacramento	1,294	62.1%	20.2%	17.2%	0.0%	0.5%	18.3%
Walnut Park	Los Angeles	16,272	63.8%	35.7%	0.0%	0.0%	0.5%	98.6%
Warm Springs	Riverside	2,196	55.8%	35.5%	7.3%	1.0%	0.3%	40.1%
Warner Valley	Plumas	0	0.0%	0.0%	0.0%	0.0%	0.0%	0.0%
Wasco	Kern	25,457	77.1%	11.6%	1.4%	8.9%	1.0%	74.0%
Washington	Nevada	19	100.0%	0.0%	0.0%	0.0%	0.0%	0.0%
Waterford	Stanislaus	8,395	80.3%	17.7%	0.3%	0.5%	1.3%	45.7%
Waterloo	San Joaquin	227	81.5%	18.5%	0.0%	0.0%	0.0%	33.0%
Watsonville	Santa Cruz	50,291	70.7%	25.1%	3.6%	0.1%	0.5%	80.1%
Waukena	Tulare	148	95.3%	4.7%	0.0%	0.0%	0.0%	66.9%
Wawona	Mariposa	80	56.2%	0.0%	43.8%	0.0%	0.0%	0.0%
Weaverville	Trinity	3,703	92.1%	6.3%	0.0%	0.5%	1.1%	11.4%
Weed	Siskiyou	2,947	87.8%	5.0%	1.1%	3.7%	2.5%	15.8%
Weedpatch	Kern	2,391	57.8%	35.5%	2.7%	0.4%	3.6%	90.8%
Weldon	Kern	2,383	82.6%	3.8%	0.0%	0.1%	13.5%	8.4%
Weott	Humboldt	87	81.6%	0.0%	0.0%	0.0%	18.4%	0.0%
West Athens	Los Angeles	8,431	26.9%	20.4%	1.1%	51.2%	0.4%	45.9%
West Bishop	Inyo	3,019	89.7%	4.1%	1.5%	4.3%	0.4%	15.8%
West Carson	Los Angeles	20,641	38.5%	18.7%	27.6%	11.9%	3.3%	34.6%
West Covina	Los Angeles	105,810	37.4%	32.4%	24.8%	5.0%	0.4%	53.6%
West Goshen	Tulare	597	92.8%	5.9%	0.0%	1.3%	0.0%	78.6%
Westhaven-Moonstone	Humboldt	1,041	88.4%	6.2%	1.2%	0.0%	4.2%	0.0%
West Hollywood	Los Angeles	34,564	84.4%	8.5%	4.7%	1.8%	0.6%	12.8%
Westlake Village	Los Angeles	8,276	89.6%	4.1%	4.9%	1.2%	0.2%	8.0%
Westley	Stanislaus	861	95.0%	5.0%	0.0%	0.0%	0.0%	90.8%
West Menlo Park	San Mateo	3,600	84.0%	3.7%	10.2%	2.2%	0.0%	5.6%
Westminster	Orange	89,440	40.1%	11.1%	47.2%	0.8%	0.8%	22.3%
West Modesto	Stanislaus	6,470	69.4%	20.0%	7.9%	2.0%	0.6%	56.8%
Westmont	Los Angeles	30,915	16.8%	30.0%	0.0%	52.5%	0.6%	45.9%
Westmorland	Imperial	1,714	90.7%	6.2%	0.0%	1.1%	2.0%	87.9%
West Park	Fresno	1,070	53.5%	39.9%	2.1%	4.6%	0.0%	81.2%
West Point	Calaveras	654	95.3%	4.7%	0.0%	0.0%	0.0%	1.2%
West Puente Valley	Los Angeles	22,485	45.2%	44.6%	9.1%	0.8%	0.4%	85.5%
West Rancho Dominguez	Los Angeles	5,474	25.8%	25.2%	4.9%	43.9%	0.3%	40.3%
West Sacramento	Yolo	47,278	64.9%	18.3%	8.4%	5.3%	3.1%	32.9%
West Whittier-Los Nietos	Los Angeles	25,358	48.4%	48.5%	1.2%	0.6%	1.3%	87.1%
Westwood	Lassen	1,473	92.7%	2.9%	0.6%	0.1%	3.7%	2.6%
Wheatland	Yuba	3,381	63.6%	24.8%	5.8%	4.1%	1.7%	23.0%
Whitehawk	Plumas	14	100.0%	0.0%	0.0%	0.0%	0.0%	0.0%
Whitewater	Riverside	533	55.5%	34.0%	10.5%	0.0%	0.0%	31.7%
Whitley Gardens	San Luis Obispo	244	58.6%	33.6%	0.0%	7.8%	0.0%	41.4%
Whittier	Los Angeles	85,161	55.7%	38.6%	3.5%	1.1%	1.0%	66.2%
Wildomar	Riverside	31,452	68.0%	23.4%	3.6%	3.9%	1.1%	37.7%
Wilkerson	Inyo	484	100.0%	0.0%	0.0%	0.0%	0.0%	0.0%
Williams	Colusa	5,003	65.0%	32.7%	0.7%	1.0%	0.7%	74.3%
Willits	Mendocino	4,896	88.9%	6.9%	2.0%	0.2%	2.1%	22.1%
Willowbrook	Los Angeles	34,322	39.2%	21.2%	0.3%	39.0%	0.2%	58.5%
Willow Creek	Humboldt	1,141	86.9%	12.2%	0.0%	0.0%	1.0%	4.0%
Willows	Glenn	6,190	76.5%	12.7%	4.8%	2.2%	3.8%	27.4%
Wilsonia	Tulare	0	0.0%	0.0%	0.0%	0.0%	0.0%	0.0%
Wilton	Sacramento	4,364	70.4%	13.8%	8.7%	1.0%	6.1%	17.0%
Winchester	Riverside	2,955	63.8%	30.7%	5.5%	0.0%	0.0%	33.4%
Windsor	Sonoma	26,229	80.1%	12.7%	3.0%	0.6%	3.7%	32.2%
Winter Gardens	San Diego	20,143	89.1%	8.2%	0.7%	1.6%	0.4%	16.1%
Winterhaven	Imperial	493	50.9%	5.9%	10.8%	0.0%	32.5%	81.5%
Winters	Yolo	6,616	78.6%	16.9%	4.0%	0.0%	0.6%	49.8%
Winton	Merced	11,742	61.2%	28.4%	8.2%	1.6%	0.7%	74.5%
Wofford Heights	Kern	2,284	96.9%	2.5%	0.0%	0.0%	0.6%	2.1%
Woodacre	Marin	1,470	92.7%	0.0%	4.2%	3.1%	0.0%	2.3%
Woodbridge	San Joaquin	4,153	77.4%	16.5%	6.0%	0.0%	0.0%	23.3%
Woodcrest	Riverside	14,519	78.0%	13.6%	4.1%	3.8%	0.4%	33.0%
Woodlake	Tulare	7,252	73.6%	25.2%	0.4%	0.2%	0.5%	86.8%
Woodland	Yolo	55,229	70.6%	20.0%	6.5%	1.4%	1.5%	44.8%
Woodlands	San Luis Obispo	417	89.2%	3.6%	3.8%	0.0%	3.4%	11.8%
Woodside	San Mateo	5,263	91.1%	4.0%	4.4%	0.2%	0.4%	6.6%
Woodville	Tulare	1,992	86.2%	13.0%	0.0%	0.0%	0.8%	88.5%
Wrightwood	San Bernardino	4,556	96.6%	2.5%	0.9%	0.0%	0.0%	10.1%
Yankee Hill	Butte	240	88.8%	11.2%	0.0%	0.0%	0.0%	2.5%
Yettem	Tulare	279	99.3%	0.7%	0.0%	0.0%	0.0%	99.3%
Yolo	Yolo	335	33.1%	44.5%	0.0%	0.0%	22.4%	94.0%
Yorba Linda	Orange	63,578	75.7%	6.4%	15.5%	1.6%	0.7%	14.5%
Yosemite Lakes	Madera	4,655	94.4%	2.2%	1.6%	0.2%	1.6%	12.3%
Yosemite Valley	Mariposa	779	90.9%	2.1%	1.0%	6.0%	0.0%	6.0%
Yountville	Napa	2,943	91.8%	4.2%	1.6%	1.9%	0.5%	12.8%
Yreka	Siskiyou	7,696	84.6%	8.9%	1.9%	1.3%	3.4%	10.3%
Yuba City	Sutter	64,224	62.2%	16.2%	17.3%	2.4%	1.9%	28.5%
Yucaipa	San Bernardino	50,862	81.0%	13.6%	2.5%	1.9%	1.0%	26.3%
Yucca Valley	San Bernardino	20,508	82.7%	11.0%	2.6%	2.4%	1.4%	14.1%
Zayante	Santa Cruz	781	97.6%	2.4%	0.0%	0.0%	0.0%	14.1%

== See also ==
- California
- California locations by crime rate
- California locations by income
- California locations by voter registration
- Demographics of California
