= List of California locations by income =

The following is a list of California locations by income.

California had a per capita income of $29,906 during the five-year period 2010 through 2014. About every third county in California had per capita incomes above the state average. Although somewhat counterintuitive, this implies that counties with per capita incomes even slightly exceeding that of the state can be classified as "high income" given the natural division of places into a top third (high), middle third (medium), and lower third (low) when ranked by per capita income. Hence, the upper third of all places in this ranking have a per capita income with a lower bound roughly equal to that of the state, about $30,000. The median place and county in California had a per capita income of roughly $25,000, and the lower third of both types of geographies had per capita incomes with an upper bound of about $20,000. Places and counties with the highest per capita income were concentrated in the San Francisco Bay Area, which has a relatively high cost of living. Those with the lowest per capita incomes were concentrated in the Central Valley, an economy in which agriculture assumes a primary role.

== Entire state ==
Population	39,242,141
Population density	253.7
Per capita income	$48,013
Median household income	$95,521
Median family income	$109,349

== Counties ==
The average population of counties with per capita incomes above the state's was twice as high (921,098) as that of those with a per capita income below the state average (546,543). Even this difference is minuscule when population density is considered: Counties with a per capita income above that of the state were eight times as dense on average (1,540.2 persons per square mile) as those with per capita income below that of the state (192.1 persons per square mile).

Marin County had by far the highest per capita income during that period ($58,004); its per capita income was almost $10,000 higher than San Francisco County, which ranked second in that regard. Of the ten counties in California with the highest per capita income, all but Orange County were in Northern California, and all but three are located in the San Francisco Bay Area. Of the three not located there, two are smaller counties located in the Sacramento metropolitan area. Orange County's per capita income ranks last among these ten, and its per capita income is about $5,000 more than that of the state.

Seven of the ten counties in California with the lowest per capita incomes are located in the Central Valley. Two of the remaining three are rural counties in Northern California. This leaves Imperial County, which shares California's portion of the U.S.-Mexico border with San Diego County. All of these counties had populations not exceeding 1,000,000, and all of them are landlocked, with the exception of Del Norte County.

Of counties with a population exceeding 1,000,000, Santa Clara County had the highest per capita income ($42,666), followed by Contra Costa County ($38,770). San Diego ($31,043), Los Angeles ($27,987), and Sacramento ($27,071) counties all had per capita incomes near that of the state.

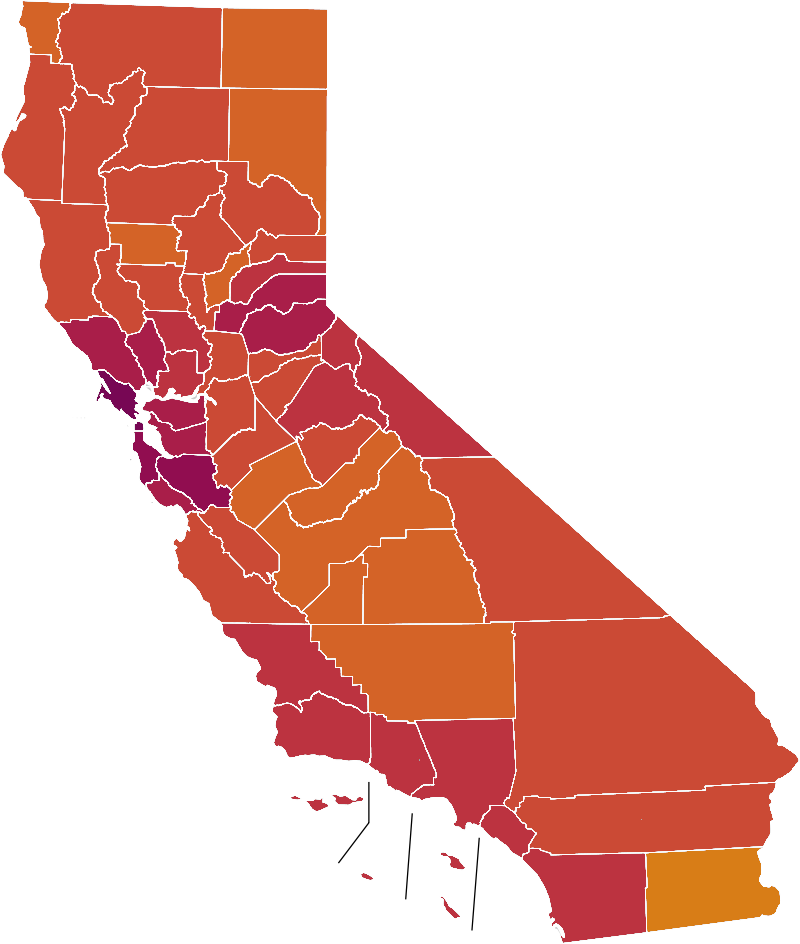
Map of counties by per capita income (ACS 2016–2020). Areas with higher income are shaded more purple, areas with lower income are shaded more orange.

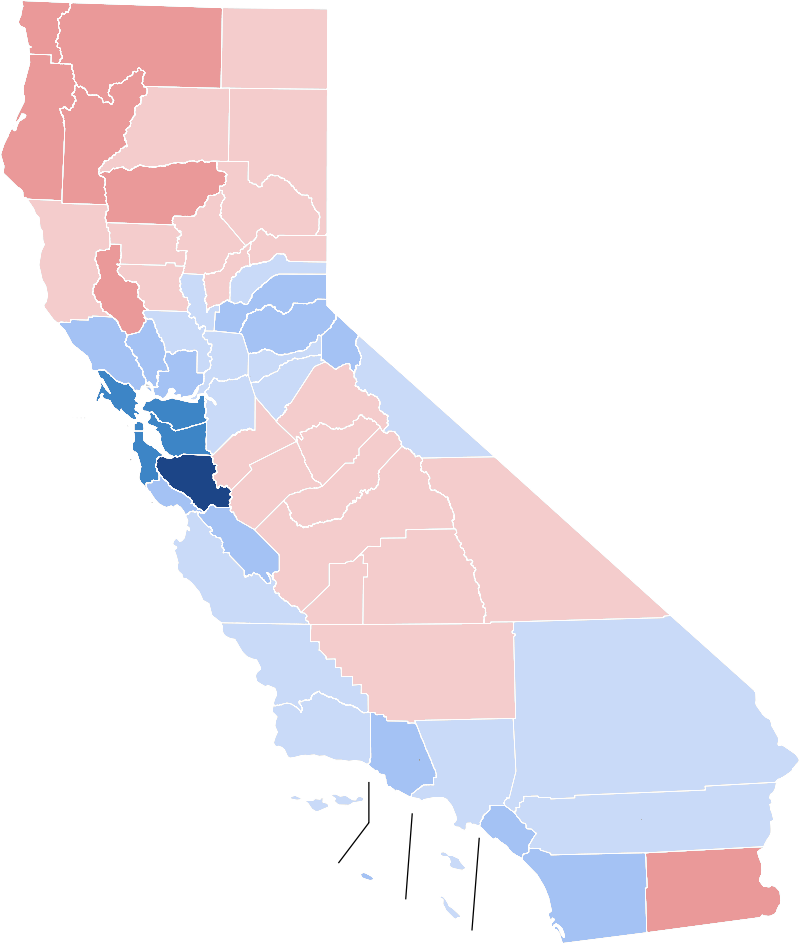
Map of counties by median household income (ACS 2016–2020). Areas with higher income are shaded more blue, areas with lower income are shaded more red.

County	Population	Population density per sq. mile (Note: Total population divided by land area in square miles.)	Income		
County	Population	Population density per sq. mile	Per capita	Median household	Median family
Alameda	1,559,308	2,109.8	$36,439	$73,775	$90,822
Alpine	1,202	1.6	$24,375	$61,343	$71,932
Amador	37,159	62.5	$27,373	$52,964	$68,765
Butte	221,578	135.4	$24,430	$43,165	$56,934
Calaveras	44,921	44.0	$29,296	$54,936	$67,100
Colusa	21,424	18.6	$22,211	$50,503	$56,472
Contra Costa	1,081,232	1496.0	$38,770	$79,799	$95,087
Del Norte	28,066	27.9	$19,424	$39,302	$52,452
El Dorado	181,465	106.3	$35,128	$68,507	$84,690
Fresno	948,844	159.2	$20,231	$45,201	$50,046
Glenn	28,019	21.3	$21,698	$40,106	$51,940
Humboldt	134,876	37.8	$23,516	$42,153	$53,532
Imperial	177,026	42.4	$16,409	$41,772	$46,555
Inyo	18,439	1.8	$27,028	$45,625	$69,041
Kern	857,730	105.5	$20,467	$48,574	$52,541
Kings	151,390	109.0	$18,518	$47,341	$50,202
Lake	64,209	51.1	$21,310	$35,997	$47,773
Lassen	33,356	7.3	$19,847	$53,351	$66,717
Los Angeles	9,974,203	2,457.9	$27,987	$55,870	$62,289
Madera	152,452	71.3	$17,797	$45,490	$49,964
Marin	256,802	493.4	$58,004	$91,529	$120,030
Mariposa	17,946	12.4	$28,327	$50,560	$63,520
Mendocino	87,612	25.0	$23,712	$43,290	$53,996
Merced	261,609	135.2	$18,464	$43,066	$47,729
Modoc	9,335	2.4	$21,830	$38,560	$46,536
Mono	14,193	4.7	$29,578	$61,814	$73,494
Monterey	424,927	129.5	$25,048	$58,582	$62,370
Napa	139,253	186.1	$35,092	$70,925	$81,275
Nevada	98,606	103.0	$32,117	$56,949	$69,649
Orange	3,086,331	3,903.6	$34,416	$75,998	$85,472
Placer	361,518	256.9	$35,711	$73,747	$88,615
Plumas	19,286	7.6	$29,167	$48,032	$60,709
Riverside	2,266,899	314.6	$23,660	$56,592	$63,523
Sacramento	1,450,277	1,503.0	$27,071	$55,615	$64,496
San Benito	56,888	41.0	$26,317	$67,874	$71,124
San Bernardino	2,078,586	103.6	$21,384	$54,100	$59,626
San Diego	3,183,143	756.7	$31,043	$63,996	$74,569
San Francisco	829,072	17,680.1	$49,986	$78,378	$93,391
San Joaquin	701,050	503.9	$22,642	$53,253	$59,614
San Luis Obispo	274,184	83.1	$30,392	$59,454	$75,828
San Mateo	739,837	1,649.7	$47,198	$91,421	$108,088
Santa Barbara	431,555	157.8	$30,526	$63,409	$73,636
Santa Clara	1,841,569	1,427.3	$42,666	$93,854	$106,401
Santa Cruz	267,203	600.2	$33,050	$66,923	$81,495
Shasta	178,520	47.3	$23,763	$44,556	$55,028
Sierra	3,019	3.2	$28,030	$43,107	$57,708
Siskiyou	44,261	7.1	$22,482	$37,495	$46,079
Solano	421,624	513.1	$29,132	$67,341	$77,634
Sonoma	491,790	312.1	$33,361	$63,799	$76,614
Stanislaus	522,794	349.8	$21,729	$49,573	$55,357
Sutter	95,067	157.8	$23,828	$51,527	$58,434
Tehama	63,284	21.5	$21,002	$42,369	$49,731
Trinity	13,515	4.3	$23,145	$36,862	$49,221
Tulare	451,108	93.5	$17,888	$42,863	$45,296
Tuolumne	54,347	24.5	$26,063	$48,493	$58,355
Ventura	835,790	453.5	$33,308	$77,335	$86,890
Yolo	204,162	201.2	$28,080	$55,508	$75,225
Yuba	73,059	115.6	$19,586	$45,470	$49,560

== Places ==
California places were unlike counties insofar as places with per capita incomes below and above the state average had about the same average population and population density. Like counties, however, the lowest-income places tend to be located in the Central Valley, and the highest-income places were concentrated in the San Francisco Bay Area.

San Francisco is an extreme example of a place in California with both a large population (829,072) and high per capita income ($49,986). In fact, it has the highest per capita income of all places in California with a population of over 100,000. Though Sunnyvale ($48,203), San Mateo ($46,782), Thousand Oaks ($46,231), and Carlsbad ($44,305) join San Francisco to make up the top five places in California with the highest per capita income in that population class, none of them have populations even close to San Francisco. The next place with a population similar to that of San Francisco that appears in the per capita income rankings is San Jose ($34,992), and at this point, the difference in per capita income with the entire state of California is only about $5,000.

Seven of the ten places with the lowest per capita income and a population of over 50,000 were in Los Angeles County, and East Los Angeles has the highest population among them (127,610).

Place	County/ies (Note: In the four instances where CDPs cross county lines, both counties are listed.)	Population	Population density	Per capita income	Median household income	Median family income
Acalanes Ridge	Contra Costa	1,226	2,659.4	$62,314	$160,000	$190,104
Acampo	San Joaquin	776	827.3	$36,756	$141,250	
Acton	Los Angeles	6,956	177.2	$39,131	$92,245	$99,448
Adelanto	San Bernardino	31,773	567.3	$9,998	$35,262	$35,537
Adin	Modoc	215	62.6	$15,452	$29,583	$60,083
Agoura Hills	Los Angeles	20,630	2,647.2	$50,242	$107,268	$118,673
Agua Dulce	Los Angeles	2,898	126.8	$37,538	$88,864	$102,989
Aguanga	Riverside	897	66.0	$26,330	$50,213	$52,420
Ahwahnee	Madera	2,165	216.0	$34,915	$59,129	$69,583
Airport	Stanislaus	1,547	2,639.9	$11,709	$21,607	$32,292
Alameda	Alameda	75,763	7,255.6	$42,331	$76,439	$93,427
Alamo	Contra Costa	15,639	1,617.4	$77,281	$163,151	$171,633
Albany	Alameda	19,020	10,637.6	$40,426	$78,769	$91,967
Albion	Mendocino	295	162.5	$23,881	$12,209	$62,500
Alderpoint	Humboldt	255	105.0	$13,177	$32,688	
Alhambra	Los Angeles	84,400	11,060.1	$24,971	$53,195	$57,056
Alhambra Valley	Contra Costa	499	375.5	$41,738	$62,000	$80,729
Aliso Viejo	Orange	49,437	7,145.1	$44,986	$102,325	$122,390
Alleghany	Sierra	115	329.5	$15,316	$37,663	
Allendale	Solano	1,613	262.9	$50,026	$123,125	$145,799
Allensworth	Tulare	480	154.7	$7,966	$25,625	$19,250
Almanor	Plumas	0	0.0			
Alondra Park	Los Angeles	8,833	7,979.2	$21,583	$55,263	$57,944
Alpaugh	Tulare	969	964.2	$9,919	$26,927	$26,776
Alpine	San Diego	14,580	544.4	$37,365	$78,433	$92,257
Alpine Village	Alpine	105	37.4	$27,154	$66,458	$115,417
Alta	Placer	369	154.8	$29,864	$55,833	$61,389
Altadena	Los Angeles	44,622	5,120.7	$42,089	$83,917	$94,886
Alta Sierra	Nevada	6,902	829.5	$34,823	$68,792	$78,983
Alto	Marin	678	5,381.0	$73,358	$62,235	$106,103
Alturas	Modoc	2,714	1,114.6	$21,118	$31,087	$55,363
Alum Rock	Santa Clara	10,992	12,947.0	$20,466	$70,202	$71,050
Amador City	Amador	164	522.3	$42,554	$48,750	$52,500
American Canyon	Napa	20,089	3,303.6	$28,451	$81,955	$89,954
Amesti	Santa Cruz	3,213	1,074.2	$19,677	$48,617	$52,031
Anaheim	Orange	342,973	6,862.6	$23,990	$59,707	$63,281
Anchor Bay	Mendocino	254	72.3	$39,850	$34,191	$85,650
Anderson	Shasta	10,066	1,579.7	$17,414	$35,225	$45,599
Angels	Calaveras	3,782	1,042.4	$31,306	$55,114	$73,229
Angwin	Napa	3,583	742.0	$21,387	$66,765	$72,813
Antelope	Sacramento	47,798	6,993.1	$23,808	$64,122	$68,510
Antioch	Contra Costa	105,630	3,728.6	$25,499	$65,770	$73,023
Anza	Riverside	2,356	85.4	$20,347	$39,489	$60,208
Apple Valley	San Bernardino	70,561	947.9	$23,543	$48,337	$54,646
Aptos	Santa Cruz	5,872	912.9	$39,214	$78,929	$91,920
Aptos Hills-Larkin Valley	Santa Cruz	1,808	195.5	$36,420	$74,185	$86,310
Arbuckle	Colusa	3,009	1,710.6	$15,611	$47,639	$50,431
Arcadia	Los Angeles	57,251	5,240.4	$38,582	$80,147	$93,635
Arcata	Humboldt	17,679	1,944.5	$18,681	$30,244	$45,728
Arden-Arcade	Sacramento	92,844	5,207.5	$31,469	$45,750	$60,601
Armona	Kings	3,531	1,854.5	$11,790	$38,622	$41,711
Arnold	Calaveras	2,728	184.5	$33,988	$58,688	$78,353
Aromas	Monterey; San Benito	2,677	565.2	$30,316	$67,019	$81,080
Arroyo Grande	San Luis Obispo	17,536	3,006.3	$32,351	$63,558	$81,883
Artesia	Los Angeles	16,698	10,301.0	$21,688	$60,544	$62,485
Artois	Glenn	194	67.4	$10,773	$60,096	$60,481
Arvin	Kern	20,028	4,156.0	$10,582	$35,359	$34,809
Ashland	Alameda	23,360	12,709.5	$18,959	$45,074	$48,571
Aspen Springs	Mono	54	15.1	$43,841		
Atascadero	San Luis Obispo	28,792	1,119.7	$32,602	$66,342	$77,998
Atherton	San Mateo	7,034	1,398.7	$144,197		
Atwater	Merced	28,686	4,691.9	$18,663	$41,619	$45,281
Auberry	Fresno	2,347	122.6	$24,603	$50,221	$60,066
Auburn	Placer	13,690	1,913.6	$36,104	$54,085	$77,027
Auburn Lake Trails	El Dorado	3,839	301.6	$36,145	$93,833	$115,853
August	San Joaquin	8,479	6,777.8	$10,941	$28,518	$33,083
Avalon	Los Angeles	3,768	1,283.8	$28,545	$54,231	$56,765
Avenal	Kings	14,553	749.3	$7,532	$29,302	$29,932
Avery	Calaveras	674	149.7	$21,169	$31,719	$36,667
Avila Beach	San Luis Obispo	1,166	194.0	$43,153	$73,304	$74,821
Avocado Heights	Los Angeles	15,432	5,702.9	$22,076	$72,174	$74,382
Azusa	Los Angeles	47,420	4,910.9	$18,159	$52,087	$57,131
Baker	San Bernardino	916	340.8	$13,559	$36,838	$38,063
Bakersfield	Kern	358,700	2,414.7	$23,786	$56,842	$61,994
Baldwin Park	Los Angeles	76,411	11,523.3	$15,419	$51,189	$51,599
Ballard	Santa Barbara	323	273.7	$65,977	$87,083	$116,250
Ballico	Merced	333	110.2	$22,216	$41,250	$73,333
Bangor	Butte	575	42.8	$19,272	$39,500	$48,409
Banning	Riverside	30,281	1,310.9	$20,246	$39,556	$46,434
Barstow	San Bernardino	23,110	559.0	$18,863	$40,648	$48,977
Bass Lake	Madera	570	296.0	$25,752	$36,250	$58,438
Bay Point	Contra Costa	21,586	3,280.5	$17,385	$41,749	$42,983
Bayview	Contra Costa	2,025	6,639.3	$29,636	$82,431	$95,150
Bayview	Humboldt	2,408	3,289.6	$18,175	$26,987	$35,987
Beale AFB	Yuba	1,342	132.9	$16,375	$42,904	$42,684
Bear Creek	Merced	197	3,456.1	$11,585	$16,719	$32,800
Bear Valley	Alpine	43	8.3	$21,109	$75,179	
Bear Valley	Mariposa	201	27.8	$10,781	$16,042	$11,597
Bear Valley Springs	Kern	5,058	121.9	$38,716	$82,761	$97,212
Beaumont	Riverside	39,620	1,279.4	$26,627	$66,775	$75,809
Beckwourth	Plumas	290	24.8	$43,100	$52,609	$81,351
Belden	Plumas	46	75.4			
Bell	Los Angeles	35,896	14,352.7	$12,031	$36,496	$36,390
Bella Vista	Shasta	2,717	122.4	$22,187	$52,041	$57,586
Bell Canyon	Ventura	2,289	632.0	$81,271	$208,508	$215,441
Bellflower	Los Angeles	77,521	12,671.0	$20,213	$49,360	$53,023
Bell Gardens	Los Angeles	42,712	17,369.7	$11,460	$37,103	$36,739
Belmont	San Mateo	26,503	5,730.4	$56,302	$106,287	$142,446
Belvedere	Marin	2,036	3,922.9	$119,798	$166,250	$181,833
Benbow	Humboldt	314	64.3	$30,828	$47,308	$46,779
Bend	Tehama	641	219.7	$33,164	$74,375	$86,964
Benicia	Solano	27,450	2,123.1	$43,640	$89,094	$113,235
Ben Lomond	Santa Cruz	6,485	775.7	$36,066	$70,281	$88,986
Benton	Mono	178	6.2	$19,566	$26,000	$43,468
Berkeley	Alameda	115,688	11,053.7	$42,406	$65,283	$114,720
Bermuda Dunes	Riverside	7,719	2,613.1	$35,103	$60,494	$61,940
Berry Creek	Butte	1,292	22.6	$22,781	$41,287	$52,188
Bertsch-Oceanview	Del Norte	2,568	468.0	$17,953	$35,678	$48,269
Bethel Island	Contra Costa	2,158	386.5	$30,388	$36,845	$72,536
Beverly Hills	Los Angeles	34,536	6,050.5	$81,788	$87,366	$123,636
Bieber	Lassen	127	77.6	$17,413	$42,083	$52,083
Big Bear City	San Bernardino	12,563	393.2	$23,024	$43,404	$50,346
Big Bear Lake	San Bernardino	5,104	804.2	$30,115	$41,058	$47,368
Big Bend	Shasta	87	15.2	$17,511	$23,750	$41,750
Big Creek	Fresno	201	437.0	$36,270	$82,917	$101,250
Biggs	Butte	2,010	3,160.4	$16,624	$40,847	$42,273
Big Lagoon	Humboldt	142	237.1	$27,510	$60,179	$92,639
Big Pine	Inyo	1,612	545.7	$26,038	$49,750	$61,563
Big River	San Bernardino	1,061	98.0	$23,785	$23,589	$34,750
Biola	Fresno	1,017	1,571.9	$8,090	$26,750	$32,333
Bishop	Inyo	3,851	2,066.0	$23,661	$30,395	$65,142
Blackhawk	Contra Costa	9,297	1,602.7	$85,049	$167,875	$195,833
Blacklake	San Luis Obispo	942	901.4	$48,044	$71,471	$81,917
Black Point-Green Point	Marin	1,111	393.0	$71,770	$117,431	$130,893
Blairsden	Plumas	35	64.6	$41,300	$11,250	
Bloomfield	Sonoma	373	45.8	$40,524	$77,955	$122,863
Bloomington	San Bernardino	25,228	4,213.8	$14,012	$48,985	$48,091
Blue Lake	Humboldt	1,258	2,121.4	$25,209	$45,750	$58,125
Bluewater	San Bernardino	174	195.1	$26,989	$40,417	$42,250
Blythe	Riverside	20,101	767.5	$15,835	$46,393	$48,400
Bodega	Sonoma	156	53.8	$53,951	$29,688	
Bodega Bay	Sonoma	603	72.3	$72,541	$86,000	$143,333
Bodfish	Kern	1,961	246.0	$16,580	$20,121	$21,861
Bolinas	Marin	1,403	240.8	$50,783	$74,310	$115,741
Bombay Beach	Imperial	171	181.7	$22,526	$15,050	$11,875
Bonadelle Ranchos-Madera Ranchos	Madera	8,503	730.6	$29,845	$77,321	$81,735
Bonita	San Diego	13,864	2,763.4	$34,407	$87,666	$99,860
Bonny Doon	Santa Cruz	2,752	164.9	$46,896	$88,221	$104,609
Bonsall	San Diego	4,138	308.9	$43,006	$69,399	$81,711
Boonville	Mendocino	1,090	196.7	$14,796	$35,938	$39,632
Bootjack	Mariposa	959	137.0	$19,924	$41,683	$54,583
Boron	Kern	2,241	162.4	$15,269	$31,333	$31,534
Boronda	Monterey	1,278	2,323.6	$13,117	$42,333	$42,292
Borrego Springs	San Diego	2,359	54.8	$21,464	$36,583	$43,750
Bostonia	San Diego	16,460	8,519.7	$19,252	$42,333	$47,347
Boulder Creek	Santa Cruz	4,741	631.1	$43,381	$79,392	$103,583
Boulevard	San Diego	434	111.1	$16,235	$12,421	$72,943
Bowles	Fresno	182	477.7	$18,409	$31,250	$90,833
Boyes Hot Springs	Sonoma	7,664	7,237.0	$26,245	$54,788	$56,331
Bradbury	Los Angeles	845	431.8	$76,472	$112,273	$116,667
Bradley	Monterey	127	1,476.7	$19,103	$53,333	$73,500
Brawley	Imperial	25,478	3,316.6	$17,700	$41,718	$47,344
Brea	Orange	40,443	3,316.9	$35,245	$81,857	$98,944
Brentwood	Contra Costa	54,062	3,640.3	$33,357	$88,697	$100,925
Bret Harte	Stanislaus	4,998	9,103.8	$9,379	$28,279	$31,389
Bridgeport	Mono	761	35.0	$28,094	$39,118	$107,896
Brisbane	San Mateo	4,421	1,428.0	$40,401	$80,233	$96,477
Broadmoor	San Mateo	4,734	10,496.7	$34,328	$100,109	$110,160
Brookdale	Santa Cruz	2,204	572.9	$56,819	$84,451	$104,817
Brooktrails	Mendocino	3,589	493.5	$22,821	$48,097	$51,250
Buckhorn	Amador	2,503	426.4	$24,548	$49,583	$57,595
Buck Meadows	Mariposa	50	28.7	$20,440		
Bucks Lake	Plumas	14	1.4			
Buellton	Santa Barbara	4,924	3,112.5	$29,597	$59,695	$84,267
Buena Park	Orange	82,191	7,809.9	$24,525	$68,884	$72,878
Buena Vista	Amador	284	175.1	$21,452	$58,419	$49,083
Burbank	Los Angeles	104,484	6,025.3	$33,882	$66,111	$82,063
Burbank	Santa Clara	5,869	14,563.3	$28,373	$64,592	$65,588
Burlingame	San Mateo	29,618	6,723.7	$61,062	$90,890	$132,210
Burney	Shasta	3,172	610.5	$19,176	$38,214	$43,346
Burnt Ranch	Trinity	308	23.0	$25,077	$55,500	$59,028
Butte Creek Canyon	Butte	805	39.3	$47,737	$75,417	$81,875
Butte Meadows	Butte	34	15.9			
Butte Valley	Butte	603	33.0	$26,612	$52,734	$52,813
Buttonwillow	Kern	1,371	197.9	$13,690	$34,274	$32,647
Byron	Contra Costa	1,305	201.1	$29,962	$75,673	$60,250
Bystrom	Stanislaus	3,805	5,359.2	$11,583	$25,543	$30,474
Cabazon	Riverside	3,266	671.2	$12,032	$40,144	$33,551
Calabasas	Los Angeles	23,956	1,747.8	$60,703	$117,176	$136,724
Calexico	Imperial	39,281	4,550.6	$12,960	$35,233	$40,218
California City	Kern	13,243	65.1	$22,908	$57,660	$61,581
California Hot Springs	Tulare	74	98.9	$23,838	$41,250	$83,750
California Pines	Modoc	367	49.4	$16,074	$41,518	$74,236
Calimesa	Riverside	8,143	548.5	$24,981	$42,392	$61,319
Calipatria	Imperial	7,599	2,044.9	$10,352	$30,911	$32,135
Calistoga	Napa	5,244	2,018.5	$33,280	$52,131	$83,889
Callender	San Luis Obispo	1,537	672.4	$29,647	$75,200	$77,936
Calpella	Mendocino	424	167.1	$22,521	$44,000	$54,038
Calpine	Sierra	189	266.2	$32,869	$25,938	$126,000
Calwa	Fresno	1,330	2,131.4	$6,559	$18,625	$14,219
Camanche North Shore	Amador	947	406.1	$33,000	$77,375	$83,276
Camanche Village	Amador	840	154.5	$29,831	$86,176	$103,214
Camarillo	Ventura	65,985	3,378.3	$39,689	$87,120	$102,201
Cambria	San Luis Obispo	6,246	734.1	$40,857	$62,948	$82,656
Cambrian Park	Santa Clara	3,318	5,567.1	$46,468	$101,406	$112,500
Cameron Park	El Dorado	18,831	1,695.4	$35,469	$74,690	$86,690
Camino	El Dorado	1,833	814.7	$35,973	$72,383	$81,477
Camino Tassajara	Contra Costa	1,789	1,404.2	$64,980	$142,371	$155,948
Campbell	Santa Clara	40,327	6,948.1	$44,769	$91,269	$103,539
Camp Nelson	Tulare	100	80.8	$46,972	$84,107	$84,107
Campo	San Diego	3,031	129.1	$28,810	$59,294	$75,272
Camp Pendleton North	San Diego	6,436	726.9	$17,566	$37,075	$37,075
Camp Pendleton South	San Diego	12,691	3,243.3	$15,779	$43,742	$43,568
Camptonville	Yuba	150	175.6	$21,369	$28,750	$47,917
Canby	Modoc	693	305.6	$11,576	$41,932	$41,932
Cantua Creek	Fresno	440	115.9	$9,890	$31,181	$31,181
Canyondam	Plumas	78	100.5	$18,027		
Canyon Lake	Riverside	10,810	2,764.0	$34,925	$74,682	$79,561
Capitola	Santa Cruz	10,043	6,304.5	$37,940	$56,607	$81,133
Caribou	Plumas	0	0.0			
Carlsbad	San Diego	109,296	2,897.0	$44,305	$87,416	$106,924
Carmel-by-the-Sea	Monterey	3,807	3,525.0	$45,928	$62,460	$92,750
Carmel Valley Village	Monterey	4,321	227.6	$55,560	$95,444	$115,333
Carmet	Sonoma	14	48.8			
Carmichael	Sacramento	63,314	4,680.2	$32,665	$54,598	$70,783
Carnelian Bay	Placer	463	356.4	$36,276	$72,083	$91,389
Carpinteria	Santa Barbara	13,323	5,152.0	$33,331	$65,467	$76,311
Carrick	Siskiyou	66	1,118.6	$12,639		
Carson	Los Angeles	92,475	4,939.1	$23,622	$71,420	$76,997
Cartago	Inyo	38	32.5	$32,953	$46,016	
Caruthers	Fresno	3,338	1,650.0	$13,785	$44,375	$44,898
Casa Conejo	Ventura	3,699	7,836.9	$28,694	$89,432	$100,125
Casa de Oro-Mount Helix	San Diego	21,076	3,076.8	$37,682	$75,637	$96,717
Casmalia	Santa Barbara	114	606.4	$20,635	$47,031	$45,938
Caspar	Mendocino	599	200.2	$28,594	$50,000	$75,104
Cassel	Shasta	349	172.3	$27,611	$34,600	$33,450
Castaic	Los Angeles	18,619	2,563.9	$35,715	$105,523	$110,130
Castle Hill	Contra Costa	1,223	1,682.3	$54,105	$113,952	$124,167
Castro Valley	Alameda	62,363	3,725.4	$38,897	$83,442	$97,572
Castroville	Monterey	6,226	6,092.0	$14,156	$50,000	$52,069
Cathedral City	Riverside	52,550	2,444.2	$19,674	$43,128	$47,489
Catheys Valley	Mariposa	878	37.5	$32,190	$51,528	$57,813
Cayucos	San Luis Obispo	2,553	823.5	$45,327	$57,863	$73,021
Cazadero	Sonoma	312	43.8	$25,780	$43,875	$42,969
Cedar Ridge	Tuolumne	1,132	145.3	$33,038	$54,271	$73,750
Cedar Slope	Tulare	0	0.0			
Cedarville	Modoc	297	54.6	$22,492	$28,274	$29,048
Centerville	Fresno	348	42.8	$39,458	$85,833	$106,250
Ceres	Stanislaus	46,570	4,992.5	$18,575	$46,132	$48,964
Cerritos	Los Angeles	49,599	5,686.7	$35,460	$91,487	$100,919
Chalfant	Mono	714	25.5	$34,043	$66,361	$86,731
Challenge-Brownsville	Yuba	952	98.1	$19,383	$47,959	$36,771
Channel Islands Beach	Ventura	2,778	6,876.2	$53,956	$90,521	$110,461
Charter Oak	Los Angeles	9,200	9,913.8	$24,139	$61,946	$70,187
Cherokee	Butte	80	45.7	$23,230	$36,875	$85,156
Cherokee Strip	Kern	295	3,241.8	$9,350	$36,250	$28,026
Cherryland	Alameda	15,244	12,735.2	$20,378	$50,374	$50,537
Cherry Valley	Riverside	6,823	850.7	$29,789	$58,080	$66,047
Chester	Plumas	1,978	271.4	$21,631	$40,417	$48,409
Chico	Butte	87,517	2,658.3	$24,775	$42,334	$60,195
Chilcoot-Vinton	Plumas	130	9.8	$14,089		
China Lake Acres	Kern	1,376	264.1	$22,054	$21,970	$37,422
Chinese Camp	Tuolumne	99	110.2	$27,201	$24,722	$103,125
Chino	San Bernardino	80,810	2,724.2	$23,116	$72,554	$78,328
Chino Hills	San Bernardino	76,187	1,705.0	$35,529	$97,609	$105,911
Chowchilla	Madera	18,411	1,653.1	$11,856	$36,852	$38,180
Chualar	Monterey	1,255	2,004.8	$15,542	$58,036	$57,679
Chula Vista	San Diego	253,031	5,098.2	$25,385	$66,110	$74,703
Citrus	Los Angeles	11,446	12,904.2	$17,422	$58,626	$61,119
Citrus Heights	Sacramento	84,678	5,951.1	$24,915	$51,150	$59,355
Claremont	Los Angeles	35,569	2,664.3	$39,402	$89,648	$108,739
Clarksburg	Yolo	406	200.1	$35,308	$49,783	$49,130
Clay	Sacramento	1,153	170.7	$35,120	$76,184	$71,429
Clayton	Contra Costa	11,328	2,950.0	$54,740	$131,136	$141,623
Clear Creek	Lassen	182	160.6	$19,851	$33,021	$65,938
Clearlake	Lake	15,121	1,492.8	$16,301	$25,532	$30,772
Clearlake Oaks	Lake	1,547	782.1	$20,844	$27,500	$38,750
Clearlake Riviera	Lake	2,912	557.4	$23,831	$43,167	$45,842
Cleone	Mendocino	679	426.2	$31,822	$62,632	$59,853
Clio	Plumas	49	85.1	$29,645	$75,313	
Clipper Mills	Butte	0	0.0			
Cloverdale	Sonoma	8,692	2,863.0	$28,677	$59,120	$67,746
Clovis	Fresno	98,815	4,210.8	$28,497	$63,662	$74,201
Clyde	Contra Costa	680	4,788.7	$27,403	$41,382	$93,750
Coachella	Riverside	42,576	1,470.7	$12,321	$40,423	$40,018
Coalinga	Fresno	17,235	2,581.6	$19,237	$50,373	$53,750
Coarsegold	Madera	1,172	106.7	$26,734	$30,216	$66,346
Cobb	Lake	1,147	230.3	$29,938	$71,641	$83,357
Coffee Creek	Trinity	132	11.5	$26,230	$58,889	$92,500
Cohasset	Butte	808	31.9	$21,582	$55,595	$58,520
Cold Springs	El Dorado	623	825.2	$23,860	$49,150	$81,458
Cold Springs	Tuolumne	193	111.3	$31,913	$34,963	
Coleville	Mono	395	28.7	$36,201	$45,147	$46,397
Colfax	Placer	2,424	1,724.0	$24,810	$46,902	$48,269
College City	Colusa	196	59.8	$26,042	$97,727	$97,727
Collierville	San Joaquin	1,942	294.5	$28,835	$51,595	$60,096
Colma	San Mateo	1,837	964.3	$30,256	$88,438	$95,208
Coloma	El Dorado	761	226.8	$30,194	$65,426	$66,051
Colton	San Bernardino	53,129	3,467.0	$16,004	$39,915	$44,608
Columbia	Tuolumne	2,456	412.0	$20,816	$40,313	$52,029
Colusa	Colusa	5,962	3,250.8	$22,606	$45,959	$50,515
Commerce	Los Angeles	12,975	1,984.6	$15,625	$45,846	$50,948
Comptche	Mendocino	77	66.7	$47,960	$83,750	
Compton	Los Angeles	97,663	9,754.6	$13,847	$43,230	$45,877
Concord	Contra Costa	125,017	4,093.0	$31,404	$67,122	$78,218
Concow	Butte	539	19.7	$29,949	$34,773	$58,438
Contra Costa Centre	Contra Costa	6,031	9,482.7	$57,385	$87,721	$107,547
Copperopolis	Calaveras	4,365	210.0	$31,166	$56,831	$71,477
Corcoran	Kings	23,634	3,149.5	$7,995	$34,082	$35,048
Corning	Tehama	7,617	2,145.6	$13,776	$36,906	$35,390
Corona	Riverside	157,395	4,052.8	$27,577	$77,021	$82,607
Coronado	San Diego	24,333	3,068.1	$48,476	$90,876	$112,608
Coronita	Riverside	3,397	4,951.9	$26,292	$78,304	$77,857
Corralitos	Santa Cruz	2,812	312.9	$36,032	$84,466	$94,778
Corte Madera	Marin	9,478	2,996.5	$64,762	$113,279	$141,143
Costa Mesa	Orange	111,635	7,110.5	$33,342	$66,491	$76,781
Cotati	Sonoma	7,347	3,908.0	$32,834	$59,808	$75,461
Coto de Caza	Orange	14,647	1,897.0	$70,990	$166,328	$172,654
Cottonwood	Shasta	4,178	1,805.5	$17,268	$42,660	$44,450
Coulterville	Mariposa	227	53.9	$28,431	$45,000	
Country Club	San Joaquin	10,018	5,225.9	$20,643	$43,323	$50,168
Courtland	Sacramento	515	286.1	$42,765	$58,472	$57,266
Covelo	Mendocino	1,444	203.5	$17,585	$26,389	$23,553
Covina	Los Angeles	48,429	6,890.9	$25,622	$64,496	$73,113
Cowan	Stanislaus	510	3,269.2	$11,454	$37,656	$25,833
Crescent City	Del Norte	7,295	3,716.3	$12,430	$27,885	$43,554
Crescent Mills	Plumas	426	100.4	$15,014	$31,655	$32,230
Cressey	Merced	322	183.2	$22,093	$53,214	$53,214
Crest	San Diego	2,393	366.4	$35,347	$74,115	$79,632
Crestline	San Bernardino	9,437	681.9	$24,754	$47,175	$53,552
Creston	San Luis Obispo	61	108.2	$58,821	$83,523	
C-Road	Plumas	213	79.9	$23,339	$78,796	$79,583
Crockett	Contra Costa	3,151	2,972.6	$42,310	$81,667	$89,588
Cromberg	Plumas	172	19.0	$48,815	$32,188	$163,030
Crowley Lake	Mono	707	251.9	$40,119	$88,500	$93,611
Crows Landing	Stanislaus	194	61.2	$13,302	$29,018	$31,563
Cudahy	Los Angeles	24,073	20,487.7	$11,400	$37,759	$36,289
Culver City	Los Angeles	39,353	7,699.7	$45,792	$79,292	$99,860
Cupertino	Santa Clara	59,787	5,285.7	$55,867	$134,872	$158,053
Cutler	Tulare	4,224	5,234.2	$6,456	$18,346	$17,629
Cutten	Humboldt	3,117	2,408.8	$30,467	$55,080	$71,381
Cuyama	Santa Barbara	72	158.9	$10,951	$27,188	$27,917
Cypress	Orange	48,748	7,373.8	$33,693	$83,819	$92,166
Daly City	San Mateo	103,897	13,599.1	$28,753	$74,489	$83,096
Dana Point	Orange	33,861	5,210.2	$51,474	$84,404	$103,457
Danville	Contra Costa	42,891	2,372.7	$65,783	$140,616	$157,842
Daphnedale Park	Modoc	20	15.0			
Darwin	Inyo	18	13.4	$24,089		
Davenport	Santa Cruz	303	106.9	$33,563	$67,031	$78,393
Davis	Yolo	66,093	6,687.5	$33,646	$57,454	$110,692
Day Valley	Santa Cruz	3,869	209.1	$39,039	$73,393	$85,438
Deer Park	Napa	1,072	192.2	$53,298	$97,266	$122,361
Del Aire	Los Angeles	10,406	10,262.3	$31,248	$79,943	$88,997
Delano	Kern	52,883	3,697.3	$10,455	$36,244	$36,684
Delft Colony	Tulare	164	2,484.8	$2,685	$8,456	$8,456
Delhi	Merced	9,918	2,825.6	$15,121	$46,224	$48,077
Delleker	Plumas	798	288.5	$20,945	$30,878	$66,250
Del Mar	San Diego	4,242	2,485.1	$87,852	$103,457	$123,938
Del Monte Forest	Monterey	6,439	800.5	$48,338	$102,396	$126,250
Del Rey	Fresno	1,489	1,223.5	$9,746	$31,222	$31,065
Del Rey Oaks	Monterey	1,727	3,597.9	$41,181	$101,250	$120,417
Del Rio	Stanislaus	1,769	970.4	$50,082	$102,679	$117,730
Denair	Stanislaus	4,892	2,469.5	$22,069	$63,136	$68,750
Derby Acres	Kern	324	90.5	$26,230	$34,792	$62,813
Descanso	San Diego	1,305	67.9	$30,185	$59,115	$54,167
Desert Center	Riverside	208	6.8	$19,180	$55,750	$56,500
Desert Edge	Riverside	4,244	1,871.3	$19,756	$30,579	$43,950
Desert Hot Springs	Riverside	27,678	916.5	$14,466	$33,575	$34,850
Desert Palms	Riverside	6,776	2,536.9	$46,954	$56,108	$82,035
Desert Shores	Imperial	1,039	1,503.6	$11,407	$30,735	$36,111
Desert View Highlands	Los Angeles	2,291	5,206.8	$19,362	$62,946	$70,650
Diablo	Contra Costa	969	714.1	$113,989	$167,188	
Diablo Grande	Stanislaus	1,083	211.8	$33,285	$92,880	$92,609
Diamond Bar	Los Angeles	56,259	3,781.1	$34,539	$90,901	$95,500
Diamond Springs	El Dorado	12,105	727.4	$24,922	$52,483	$68,474
Dillon Beach	Marin	82	27.5	$42,220	$44,417	$46,389
Dinuba	Tulare	22,828	3,528.3	$12,838	$38,509	$37,478
Discovery Bay	Contra Costa	14,315	2,272.2	$43,649	$112,063	$114,085
Dixon	Solano	18,718	2,626.0	$26,501	$66,818	$71,994
Dixon Lane-Meadow Creek	Inyo	2,447	728.3	$27,392	$44,792	$72,394
Dobbins	Yuba	658	84.9	$19,331	$35,469	$48,182
Dogtown	San Joaquin	2,475	190.9	$30,638	$68,281	$79,565
Dollar Point	Placer	1,076	658.1	$44,872	$68,892	$87,500
Dorrington	Calaveras	349	96.2	$42,523	$81,477	$80,909
Dorris	Siskiyou	1,115	1,588.3	$13,843	$30,179	$32,708
Dos Palos	Merced	5,023	3,723.5	$13,218	$33,700	$34,171
Dos Palos Y	Merced	171	108.4	$19,360	$17,708	$22,000
Douglas City	Trinity	670	26.8	$22,331	$31,645	$52,000
Downey	Los Angeles	113,082	9,113.6	$23,216	$60,374	$64,187
Downieville	Sierra	233	73.2	$29,637	$54,196	$112,589
Doyle	Lassen	382	62.6	$20,169	$21,950	$39,196
Drytown	Amador	148	40.1	$25,704	$77,188	$107,700
Duarte	Los Angeles	21,676	3,240.1	$26,421	$62,186	$72,440
Dublin	Alameda	49,694	3,262.3	$44,679	$114,699	$128,737
Ducor	Tulare	646	1,059.0	$10,834	$28,036	$23,833
Dunnigan	Yolo	1,017	194.4	$27,670	$63,875	$74,828
Dunsmuir	Siskiyou	1,482	923.9	$20,503	$29,464	$38,571
Durham	Butte	5,743	70.2	$34,648	$69,323	$75,050
Dustin Acres	Kern	295	80.3	$24,897	$48,269	$59,688
Dutch Flat	Placer	132	222.6	$33,769	$54,000	$58,750
Eagleville	Modoc	70	72.2	$19,651	$28,333	$52,083
Earlimart	Tulare	8,310	3,947.7	$7,894	$24,968	$26,435
East Foothills	Santa Clara	6,479	3,094.1	$49,726	$120,881	$122,969
East Hemet	Riverside	18,188	3,489.0	$19,371	$45,374	$49,055
East Los Angeles	Los Angeles	127,610	17,128.9	$12,905	$39,103	$41,577
East Nicolaus	Sutter	251	54.8	$22,273	$42,566	$44,408
East Oakdale	Stanislaus	2,901	611.8	$40,010	$84,018	$95,938
Easton	Fresno	1,991	661.2	$26,678	$58,813	$63,917
East Orosi	Tulare	321	1,294.4	$7,465	$29,000	$31,375
East Palo Alto	San Mateo	28,920	11,540.3	$18,527	$52,716	$53,094
East Pasadena	Los Angeles	6,123	4,642.2	$45,380	$76,019	$87,273
East Porterville	Tulare	6,585	2,209.7	$10,164	$31,900	$31,012
East Quincy	Plumas	2,633	217.4	$23,396	$51,045	$56,667
East Rancho Dominguez	Los Angeles	15,343	18,665.5	$13,065	$44,964	$47,115
East Richmond Heights	Contra Costa	3,501	6,036.2	$32,733	$68,185	$83,125
East San Gabriel	Los Angeles	15,573	9,982.7	$33,792	$72,500	$90,219
East Shore	Plumas	203	171.6	$48,613	$80,625	$152,083
East Sonora	Tuolumne	2,168	875.6	$28,074	$43,484	$52,500
East Tulare Villa	Tulare	951	1,973.0	$15,225	$45,446	$45,625
Eastvale	Riverside	55,298	4,366.9	$28,687	$109,783	$109,717
East Whittier	Los Angeles	10,440	9,578.0	$27,809	$66,377	$73,207
Edgewood	Siskiyou	30	29.5	$15,243	$34,375	$35,313
Edmundson Acres	Kern	274	4,151.5	$9,448	$35,000	$34,375
Edna	San Luis Obispo	174	142.7	$31,055	$75,294	$75,417
Edwards AFB	Kern	2,503	146.1	$20,554	$63,162	$64,265
El Cajon	San Diego	101,582	7,016.3	$20,430	$45,957	$50,257
El Centro	Imperial	43,268	3,903.6	$18,463	$41,677	$47,303
El Cerrito	Contra Costa	24,136	6,599.9	$45,190	$88,380	$104,524
El Cerrito	Riverside	5,551	2,174.3	$22,752	$60,987	$61,467
El Dorado Hills	El Dorado	43,862	905.3	$46,853	$118,306	$129,292
Eldridge	Sonoma	1,333	2,044.5	$29,956	$54,355	$61,786
El Granada	San Mateo	5,377	1,114.9	$57,758	$110,000	$158,309
Elizabeth Lake	Los Angeles	1,603	256.6	$30,157	$56,806	$66,500
Elk Creek	Glenn	136	93.9	$23,439	$42,500	$44,464
Elk Grove	Sacramento	158,455	3,755.5	$29,695	$79,051	$84,732
Elkhorn	Monterey	1,342	279.1	$33,900	$84,758	$103,750
Elmira	Solano	242	455.7	$24,259	$71,793	$70,870
El Monte	Los Angeles	115,243	12,052.2	$15,010	$38,906	$40,727
El Nido	Merced	412	125.2	$29,007	$30,956	$33,375
El Paso de Robles (Paso Robles)	San Luis Obispo	30,522	1,594.1	$28,358	$59,978	$66,880
El Portal	Mariposa	601	584.1	$41,825	$102,872	$103,429
El Rancho	Tulare	16	222.2			
El Rio	Ventura	6,785	3,352.3	$17,696	$59,179	$67,039
El Segundo	Los Angeles	16,839	3,082.4	$42,575	$84,004	$103,205
El Sobrante	Contra Costa	13,122	4,745.8	$30,822	$60,732	$66,806
El Sobrante	Riverside	14,855	2,059.5	$30,822	$99,080	$99,126
El Verano	Sonoma	4,338	3,798.6	$25,804	$50,811	$43,250
Elverta	Sacramento	5,547	627.3	$23,017	$60,718	$61,516
Emerald Lake Hills	San Mateo	4,519	3,781.6	$80,009	$166,063	$188,654
Emeryville	Alameda	10,497	8,194.4	$53,155	$69,329	$84,688
Empire	Stanislaus	4,296	2,748.6	$12,446	$31,446	$34,128
Encinitas	San Diego	61,008	3,243.0	$48,067	$92,564	$111,696
Escalon	San Joaquin	7,252	3,151.7	$26,249	$57,971	$72,694
Escondido	San Diego	147,603	3,982.9	$21,684	$49,409	$53,983
Esparto	Yolo	3,229	701.8	$19,565	$64,844	$66,652
Etna	Siskiyou	750	986.8	$14,168	$26,711	$28,438
Eucalyptus Hills	San Diego	5,352	1,124.8	$31,768	$71,861	$78,313
Eureka	Humboldt	27,039	2,881.4	$21,151	$38,007	$50,807
Exeter	Tulare	10,468	4,250.1	$19,357	$41,341	$46,295
Fairbanks Ranch	San Diego	3,245	637.0	$55,172	$119,228	$133,707
Fairfax	Marin	7,546	3,423.8	$56,506	$93,354	$132,545
Fairfield	Solano	107,983	2,888.2	$27,110	$66,190	$75,091
Fairmead	Madera	1,983	256.3	$10,861	$31,058	$37,550
Fair Oaks	Sacramento	31,256	2,895.1	$40,467	$73,295	$91,885
Fairview	Alameda	9,852	3,582.5	$36,521	$90,365	$100,551
Fallbrook	San Diego	31,435	1,793.7	$25,565	$51,765	$56,025
Fall River Mills	Shasta	712	274.6	$17,021	$32,824	$30,893
Farmersville	Tulare	10,675	4,727.6	$11,102	$32,455	$34,538
Farmington	San Joaquin	124	48.8	$55,222	$19,886	$130,357
Fellows	Kern	98	149.4	$24,036	$63,250	$63,500
Felton	Santa Cruz	3,957	869.3	$41,368	$75,550	$95,000
Ferndale	Humboldt	1,456	1,417.7	$37,233	$45,948	$61,058
Fetters Hot Springs-Agua Caliente	Sonoma	4,866	3,330.6	$28,459	$58,232	$60,761
Fiddletown	Amador	86	18.6	$23,801	$42,500	
Fieldbrook	Humboldt	812	77.6	$30,480	$62,750	$82,292
Fields Landing	Humboldt	130	469.3	$25,299	$16,537	
Fillmore	Ventura	15,203	4,519.3	$19,205	$54,519	$60,142
Firebaugh	Fresno	7,935	2,257.5	$12,436	$31,312	$33,518
Fish Camp	Mariposa	44	48.7	$15,666		
Florence-Graham	Los Angeles	62,815	17,546.1	$10,957	$33,992	$33,360
Florin	Sacramento	50,791	5,834.7	$16,358	$40,183	$44,694
Floriston	Nevada	58	61.1	$36,800	$56,607	$59,375
Flournoy	Tehama	143	24.7	$18,901	$58,500	$59,250
Folsom	Sacramento	73,334	3,341.4	$38,472	$100,163	$116,527
Fontana	San Bernardino	201,355	4,745.6	$19,685	$64,995	$66,795
Foothill Farms	Sacramento	33,024	7,862.9	$19,658	$44,590	$45,764
Forbestown	Butte	450	71.7	$20,552	$63,676	$64,853
Ford City	Kern	4,154	2,706.2	$14,873	$32,134	$38,448
Foresthill	Placer	1,345	120.2	$26,123	$34,821	$75,820
Forest Meadows	Calaveras	1,674	296.0	$40,314	$70,484	$85,114
Forest Ranch	Butte	1,064	76.4	$30,503	$41,649	$48,313
Forestville	Sonoma	3,461	658.4	$28,818	$55,740	$66,136
Fort Bidwell	Modoc	161	50.3	$16,952	$23,333	$29,167
Fort Bragg	Mendocino	7,274	2,646.1	$20,585	$34,057	$54,615
Fort Irwin	San Bernardino	9,191	1,319.6	$19,077	$49,928	$51,134
Fort Jones	Siskiyou	848	1,408.6	$16,945	$39,500	$51,250
Fortuna	Humboldt	11,863	2,448.5	$21,626	$42,450	$51,213
Fort Washington	Fresno	430	3,467.7	$64,517	$92,566	$92,566
Foster City	San Mateo	31,809	8,379.6	$55,318	$114,651	$130,566
Fountain Valley	Orange	56,440	6,221.3	$34,382	$82,532	$93,322
Fowler	Fresno	5,908	2,324.2	$19,298	$47,731	$62,070
Franklin	Merced	6,840	3,403.0	$15,950	$34,671	$41,273
Franklin	Sacramento	33	15.7	$23,882	$24,531	
Frazier Park	Kern	2,730	539.1	$20,707	$43,077	$56,336
Freedom	Santa Cruz	3,205	2,903.1	$18,078	$51,492	$52,885
Freeport	Sacramento	68	1,545.5	$25,197	$46,250	
Fremont	Alameda	221,654	2,861.3	$40,815	$103,591	$112,347
French Camp	San Joaquin	4,155	1,322.4	$10,460	$35,833	$46,350
French Gulch	Shasta	441	35.8	$14,994	$28,750	$27,833
French Valley	Riverside	26,753	2,456.4	$26,621	$88,699	$88,614
Fresno	Fresno	506,132	4,470.2	$19,226	$41,455	$45,554
Friant	Fresno	263	210.2	$20,332	$18,884	$17,000
Fruitdale	Santa Clara	1,089	4,078.7	$43,850	$73,250	$103,333
Fruitridge Pocket	Sacramento	5,802	9,542.8	$10,884	$32,853	$34,948
Fuller Acres	Kern	924	1,225.5	$10,343	$33,750	$28,472
Fullerton	Orange	137,945	6,149.2	$29,733	$65,909	$76,187
Fulton	Sonoma	441	226.3	$34,310	$65,750	$116,146
Furnace Creek	Inyo	187	6.0	$29,232	$33,000	$53,359
Galt	Sacramento	24,280	4,050.0	$22,609	$59,375	$62,452
Garberville	Humboldt	1,061	395.9	$18,239	$29,694	$37,127
Gardena	Los Angeles	59,682	10,238.8	$23,230	$47,856	$54,331
Garden Acres	San Joaquin	11,172	4,315.2	$13,032	$38,940	$39,460
Garden Farms	San Luis Obispo	341	312.0	$53,338	$102,344	$100,156
Garden Grove	Orange	173,853	9,681.6	$21,241	$59,360	$62,562
Garey	Santa Barbara	74	58.5	$17,823	$62,500	$46,667
Garnet	Riverside	6,380	809.2	$13,804	$37,910	$39,785
Gasquet	Del Norte	500	105.1	$22,000	$35,547	$38,750
Gazelle	Siskiyou	76	131.0	$12,700	$21,071	$30,833
Georgetown	El Dorado	2,458	162.5	$23,926	$46,136	$78,487
Gerber	Tehama	1,201	1,301.2	$14,062	$31,781	$32,232
Geyserville	Sonoma	879	194.7	$22,451	$49,271	$49,931
Gilroy	Santa Clara	50,776	3,145.6	$29,559	$81,056	$86,098
Glendale	Los Angeles	195,380	6,417.7	$29,264	$52,451	$61,806
Glendora	Los Angeles	50,855	2,621.5	$32,090	$74,169	$82,961
Glen Ellen	Sonoma	614	292.1	$43,374	$48,750	$49,167
Golden Hills	Kern	8,398	685.6	$26,782	$64,425	$68,682
Gold Mountain	Plumas	22	3.6			
Gold River	Sacramento	7,658	2,904.1	$57,795	$102,500	$115,926
Goleta	Santa Barbara	30,333	3,863.6	$33,469	$75,766	$92,391
Gonzales	Monterey	8,336	4,348.5	$19,466	$51,178	$43,370
Good Hope	Riverside	8,911	793.3	$11,960	$34,801	$39,135
Goodyears Bar	Sierra	23	11.2			
Goshen	Tulare	3,832	2,155.2	$10,421	$38,162	$34,211
Graeagle	Plumas	546	49.3	$36,458	$54,688	$68,625
Grand Terrace	San Bernardino	12,252	3,498.6	$29,572	$64,140	$78,763
Grangeville	Kings	607	948.4	$30,119	$50,450	$67,125
Granite Bay	Placer	22,646	1,051.9	$55,636	$118,063	$135,583
Granite Hills	San Diego	3,438	1,230.9	$48,827	$111,684	$126,618
Graniteville	Nevada	0	0.0			
Grass Valley	Nevada	12,861	2,711.6	$23,005	$33,325	$40,591
Graton	Sonoma	1,626	1,029.8	$26,548	$37,927	$56,250
Grayson	Stanislaus	888	348.4	$14,153	$28,068	$35,096
Greeley Hill	Mariposa	566	26.9	$21,738	$30,766	$58,646
Greenacres	Kern	4,949	2,587.0	$30,071	$64,052	$69,561
Green Acres	Riverside	2,330	1,664.3	$14,428	$55,417	$55,444
Greenfield	Kern	3,974	2,746.4	$21,522	$51,410	$50,625
Greenfield	Monterey	16,715	7,829.0	$13,567	$52,374	$49,544
Greenhorn	Plumas	182	27.1	$52,332	$58,023	$48,875
Green Valley	Los Angeles	1,022	79.8	$46,357	$93,313	$129,531
Green Valley	Solano	1,217	146.5	$72,511	$77,946	$134,766
Greenview	Siskiyou	183	141.3	$8,551	$14,193	$14,193
Greenville	Plumas	950	118.9	$24,222	$30,766	$31,944
Grenada	Siskiyou	421	815.9	$19,725	$30,750	$36,250
Gridley	Butte	6,566	3,172.0	$16,870	$42,542	$47,438
Grimes	Colusa	419	185.3	$14,078	$40,947	$29,750
Grizzly Flats	El Dorado	771	116.3	$20,361	$56,250	$67,981
Groveland	Tuolumne	725	75.8	$16,038	$31,932	$33,735
Grover Beach	San Luis Obispo	13,337	5,773.6	$26,781	$49,418	$54,955
Guadalupe	Santa Barbara	7,160	5,469.8	$14,903	$45,456	$46,420
Guerneville	Sonoma	3,775	388.8	$34,303	$42,712	$58,269
Guinda	Yolo	599	206.1	$13,122	$77,596	$78,317
Gustine	Merced	5,610	3,617.0	$20,620	$38,173	$47,646
Hacienda Heights	Los Angeles	55,179	4,937.7	$28,614	$76,435	$81,135
Half Moon Bay	San Mateo	11,803	1,837.6	$54,270	$103,239	$108,700
Hamilton Branch	Plumas	634	584.3	$29,462	$60,268	$63,750
Hamilton City	Glenn	1,718	5,506.4	$13,338	$32,774	$33,547
Hanford	Kings	54,523	3,244.6	$22,307	$53,543	$59,543
Happy Camp	Siskiyou	1,153	95.2	$15,357	$25,625	$31,458
Harbison Canyon	San Diego	4,577	454.6	$29,795	$81,913	$83,098
Hardwick	Kings	184	1,323.7	$12,236	$18,250	$19,000
Hartland	Tulare	0	0.0			
Hartley	Solano	2,458	379.6	$42,008	$97,100	$103,060
Hasley Canyon	Los Angeles	1,296	225.8	$41,556	$100,972	$96,417
Hat Creek	Shasta	215	4.3	$22,517	$36,027	$48,558
Hawaiian Gardens	Los Angeles	14,432	15,223.6	$13,557	$39,073	$38,246
Hawthorne	Los Angeles	85,889	14,124.2	$20,445	$44,384	$47,091
Hayfork	Trinity	2,372	32.9	$18,810	$28,287	$46,108
Hayward	Alameda	149,596	3,293.6	$25,770	$62,691	$69,415
Healdsburg	Sonoma	11,466	2,572.6	$32,461	$58,176	$65,375
Heber	Imperial	4,256	2,869.9	$11,565	$35,153	$36,097
Hemet	Riverside	81,203	2,916.0	$18,284	$33,932	$41,824
Herald	Sacramento	1,221	155.0	$36,154	$92,045	$92,159
Hercules	Contra Costa	24,596	3,835.9	$37,978	$100,267	$113,447
Herlong	Lassen	1,702	1,045.5	$6,846	$50,781	$44,167
Hermosa Beach	Los Angeles	19,725	13,822.7	$74,730	$105,029	$167,750
Hesperia	San Bernardino	91,757	1,255.3	$16,584	$44,472	$50,027
Hickman	Stanislaus	479	445.2	$20,190	$48,000	$57,500
Hidden Hills	Los Angeles	1,749	1,035.5	$126,620	$245,694	
Hidden Meadows	San Diego	3,283	498.7	$38,942	$61,234	$81,875
Hidden Valley Lake	Lake	6,168	633.7	$24,252	$65,706	$67,382
Highgrove	Riverside	4,067	1,263.4	$16,332	$41,087	$46,071
Highland	San Bernardino	54,032	2,880.9	$21,578	$53,385	$57,517
Highlands-Baywood Park	San Mateo	4,298	2,373.3	$59,656	$135,345	$162,235
Hillsborough	San Mateo	11,148	1,801.0	$127,868		
Hilmar-Irwin	Merced	5,266	1,340.6	$27,961	$52,775	$55,500
Hiouchi	Del Norte	413	712.1	$26,170	$46,083	$71,406
Hollister	San Benito	36,067	4,924.5	$22,516	$66,045	$66,363
Holtville	Imperial	6,067	5,284.8	$14,247	$29,628	$32,240
Home Garden	Kings	1,787	4,024.8	$11,708	$32,976	$33,631
Home Gardens	Riverside	11,701	7,519.9	$15,198	$52,704	$51,076
Homeland	Riverside	5,921	1,386.7	$16,804	$36,516	$44,667
Homestead Valley	San Bernardino	3,366	99.3	$15,712	$30,527	$31,844
Homewood Canyon	Inyo	20	2.0			
Honcut	Butte	145	34.2	$24,944	$70,064	
Hood	Sacramento	311	987.3	$20,970	$75,556	$78,385
Hopland	Mendocino	587	166.5	$21,892	$38,750	$67,917
Hornbrook	Siskiyou	275	236.1	$14,389	$27,083	$36,406
Hornitos	Mariposa	56	48.0			
Hughson	Stanislaus	6,895	3,489.4	$21,964	$50,109	$57,042
Humboldt Hill	Humboldt	3,704	891.9	$23,598	$48,134	$54,657
Huntington Beach	Orange	195,686	7,265.4	$42,680	$82,554	$97,638
Huntington Park	Los Angeles	58,787	19,511.1	$12,088	$34,777	$35,367
Huron	Fresno	6,777	4,259.6	$9,968	$28,896	$25,859
Hyampom	Trinity	255	12.6	$20,368	$29,952	$33,672
Hydesville	Humboldt	1,354	180.5	$26,257	$56,216	$65,875
Idlewild	Tulare	32	69.7	$32,731		
Idyllwild-Pine Cove	Riverside	2,562	186.7	$33,070	$60,500	$67,056
Imperial	Imperial	15,782	2,695.0	$24,109	$73,683	$74,683
Imperial Beach	San Diego	26,857	6,454.5	$19,896	$48,117	$54,639
Independence	Inyo	681	139.9	$26,470	$50,625	$71,071
Indian Falls	Plumas	23	12.5	$6,722		
Indianola	Humboldt	889	629.6	$25,538	$40,769	$50,208
Indian Wells	Riverside	5,089	355.3	$81,359	$85,000	$108,000
Indio	Riverside	82,539	2,692.3	$20,674	$47,922	$54,656
Indio Hills	Riverside	910	42.3	$18,471	$37,386	$36,705
Industry	Los Angeles	384	32.6	$19,617	$51,951	$51,890
Inglewood	Los Angeles	111,133	12,255.5	$19,837	$42,249	$46,449
Interlaken	Santa Cruz	6,954	709.2	$22,324	$70,541	$72,222
Inverness	Marin	1,368	213.8	$52,826	$51,850	$91,458
Inyokern	Kern	665	60.9	$35,933	$51,172	$107,411
Ione	Amador	7,318	1,592.6	$13,793	$50,617	$77,361
Iron Horse	Plumas	343	44.3	$27,161	$97,829	$97,829
Irvine	Orange	229,850	3,505.4	$43,456	$91,999	$109,956
Irwindale	Los Angeles	1,530	173.4	$18,122	$56,625	$60,750
Isla Vista	Santa Barbara	24,792	13,401.1	$8,904	$19,237	$38,810
Isleton	Sacramento	792	1,800.0	$17,200	$30,900	$32,273
Ivanhoe	Tulare	4,044	2,007.9	$9,915	$32,783	$33,656
Jackson	Amador	4,616	1,237.5	$24,618	$41,745	$50,150
Jacumba	San Diego	77	12.6	$99,860		
Jamestown	Tuolumne	3,394	1,133.6	$22,768	$38,488	$29,362
Jamul	San Diego	5,445	328.3	$39,791	$109,492	$113,799
Janesville	Lassen	1,474	111.8	$30,675	$73,617	$73,165
Jenner	Sonoma	109	51.7	$45,506	$83,750	$80,250
Johannesburg	Kern	79	32.7	$14,733	$13,906	
Johnstonville	Lassen	1,072	128.3	$27,946	$67,708	$73,654
Johnsville	Plumas	35	2.5			
Joshua Tree	San Bernardino	7,564	204.2	$22,792	$38,297	$47,226
Julian	San Diego	1,345	171.6	$31,063	$77,050	$75,500
Junction City	Trinity	920	33.0	$21,224	$37,917	$55,625
June Lake	Mono	589	73.7	$20,604	$50,595	$51,518
Jurupa Valley	Riverside	97,247	2,265.2	$18,579	$55,898	$59,710
Keddie	Plumas	89	138.0	$42,799	$83,594	$84,010
Keeler	Inyo	80	61.4	$10,664	$13,824	$14,632
Keene	Kern	325	33.6	$29,119	$65,474	$66,379
Kelly Ridge	Butte	2,594	1,329.6	$25,509	$38,645	$46,338
Kelseyville	Lake	3,516	1,218.7	$17,378	$37,606	$46,000
Kennedy	San Joaquin	3,487	2,879.4	$10,334	$37,675	$39,550
Kennedy Meadows	Tulare	37	6.4	$22,359	$14,408	
Kensington	Contra Costa	5,351	5,650.5	$67,369	$136,625	$156,179
Kentfield	Marin	6,667	2,204.0	$109,976	$175,573	$246,771
Kenwood	Sonoma	1,075	208.1	$75,128	$86,719	$103,505
Kerman	Fresno	14,110	4,364.4	$15,199	$45,539	$48,822
Kernville	Kern	1,354	109.5	$31,106	$51,731	$61,250
Keswick	Shasta	410	121.4	$27,618	$60,417	$71,250
Kettleman City	Kings	1,648	7,810.4	$13,434	$41,131	$40,060
Keyes	Stanislaus	6,364	2,249.6	$13,124	$37,421	$40,714
King City	Monterey	13,171	3,425.5	$12,770	$40,500	$41,087
Kings Beach	Placer	3,384	984.0	$20,677	$39,639	$44,306
Kingsburg	Fresno	11,582	4,101.3	$25,921	$60,361	$70,305
Kingvale	Nevada; Placer	177	184.0	$33,515	$63,295	$63,295
Kirkwood	Alpine; Amador	98	22.5	$13,118	$39,375	
Klamath	Del Norte	955	76.2	$15,828	$30,769	$38,173
Knightsen	Contra Costa	1,644	196.7	$29,127	$78,672	$80,500
Knights Landing	Yolo	1,161	2,317.4	$20,478	$45,789	$42,596
La Cañada Flintridge	Los Angeles	20,477	2,373.3	$71,758	$151,786	$169,482
La Crescenta-Montrose	Los Angeles	20,241	5,908.1	$38,256	$89,737	$109,722
Ladera	San Mateo	1,497	3,282.9	$95,386	$225,391	
Ladera Heights	Los Angeles	7,362	2,482.1	$56,573	$100,811	$118,456
Ladera Ranch	Orange	26,010	5,372.9	$50,478	$131,952	$149,125
Lafayette	Contra Costa	24,685	1,640.5	$67,896	$138,073	$176,250
Laguna Beach	Orange	23,114	2,598.8	$79,340	$97,881	$138,869
Laguna Hills	Orange	30,768	4,661.1	$43,958	$91,460	$103,304
Laguna Niguel	Orange	64,299	4,361.9	$51,750	$98,957	$126,029
Laguna Woods	Orange	16,302	4,873.5	$37,419	$36,708	$54,357
Lagunitas-Forest Knolls	Marin	2,007	472.6	$38,092	$79,148	$100,335
La Habra	Orange	61,341	8,341.2	$25,646	$61,364	$68,954
La Habra Heights	Los Angeles	5,398	876.4	$51,293	$111,250	$113,833
La Honda	San Mateo	741	174.2	$48,114	$104,479	$162,552
Lake Almanor Country Club	Plumas	530	193.2	$67,541	$74,286	$89,000
Lake Almanor Peninsula	Plumas	470	154.8	$38,839	$59,583	$77,000
Lake Almanor West	Plumas	263	115.0	$75,154	$113,819	$113,472
Lake Arrowhead	San Bernardino	11,255	634.9	$29,997	$64,461	$73,135
Lake California	Tehama	2,851	452.9	$26,009	$52,165	$47,414
Lake City	Modoc	35	6.0	$18,940	$37,750	
Lake Davis	Plumas	45	8.3	$16,027		
Lake Don Pedro	Mariposa	995	79.2	$37,353	$71,970	$86,750
Lake Elsinore	Riverside	56,243	1,466.6	$21,016	$63,303	$65,855
Lake Forest	Orange	78,940	4,745.1	$38,760	$92,781	$109,426
Lakehead	Shasta	493	105.0	$19,697	$31,136	$40,500
Lake Hughes	Los Angeles	469	44.1	$16,426	$21,932	$43,000
Lake Isabella	Kern	3,093	142.4	$17,300	$22,726	$37,232
Lakeland Village	Riverside	11,343	1,307.4	$18,725	$41,289	$45,028
Lake Los Angeles	Los Angeles	11,948	1,226.6	$15,918	$40,227	$42,426
Lake Mathews	Riverside	5,518	346.5	$27,927	$69,011	$71,463
Lake Nacimiento	San Luis Obispo	2,497	241.3	$36,293	$68,516	$80,357
Lake of the Pines	Nevada	3,563	2,383.3	$38,479	$75,403	$84,271
Lake of the Woods	Kern	539	153.0	$24,728	$33,750	$34,219
Lakeport	Lake	4,746	1,552.0	$25,590	$36,361	$46,941
Lake Riverside	Riverside	858	119.4	$20,839	$61,484	$70,156
Lake San Marcos	San Diego	4,679	2,718.8	$30,845	$43,125	$67,927
Lake Sherwood	Ventura	1,526	482.8	$120,676	$230,000	
Lakeside	San Diego	21,079	3,054.9	$26,236	$62,037	$74,608
Lakeview	Riverside	1,723	528.5	$16,372	$47,383	$54,426
Lake Wildwood	Nevada	5,293	1,732.0	$35,366	$65,427	$77,969
Lakewood	Los Angeles	80,926	8,591.8	$29,981	$79,113	$88,660
La Mesa	San Diego	58,239	6,414.7	$30,728	$54,630	$69,955
La Mirada	Los Angeles	49,038	6,269.2	$29,467	$81,178	$90,696
Lamont	Kern	16,359	3,564.1	$10,475	$33,433	$31,278
Lanare	Fresno	398	197.2	$10,910	$47,875	$47,875
Lancaster	Los Angeles	159,092	1,687.1	$19,703	$49,057	$54,993
La Palma	Orange	15,791	8,856.4	$33,524	$84,026	$90,080
La Porte	Plumas	12	2.7			
La Presa	San Diego	34,739	6,319.6	$22,135	$60,817	$66,449
La Puente	Los Angeles	40,342	11,595.9	$15,509	$54,660	$55,150
La Quinta	Riverside	38,774	1,103.6	$39,021	$71,074	$80,473
La Riviera	Sacramento	11,529	6,231.9	$27,789	$58,694	$62,952
Larkfield-Wikiup	Sonoma	8,831	1,663.7	$37,027	$75,230	$83,295
Larkspur	Marin	12,131	4,007.6	$65,707	$82,568	$115,363
La Selva Beach	Santa Cruz	2,932	553.5	$51,592	$108,611	$105,833
Las Flores	Orange	6,311	2,842.8	$49,984	$121,696	$140,000
Las Flores	Tehama	154	430.2	$11,416	$27,763	$43,958
Las Lomas	Monterey	3,409	3,287.4	$13,409	$68,194	$68,352
Lathrop	San Joaquin	19,163	873.8	$18,488	$63,087	$64,136
Laton	Fresno	1,144	590.6	$19,300	$29,865	$29,625
La Verne	Los Angeles	31,592	3,747.6	$34,778	$75,662	$95,045
La Vina	Madera	436	4,316.8	$8,407	$31,900	$31,900
Lawndale	Los Angeles	33,155	16,795.8	$18,145	$48,376	$50,507
Laytonville	Mendocino	1,227	228.6	$15,235	$31,190	$36,458
Lebec	Kern	1,333	87.0	$17,666	$56,324	$55,294
Lee Vining	Mono	234	44.8	$9,196		
Leggett	Mendocino	54	20.0	$18,922	$43,571	
Le Grand	Merced	1,823	1,599.1	$13,865	$38,625	$38,571
Lemon Cove	Tulare	214	256.6	$17,693	$34,875	$39,444
Lemon Grove	San Diego	25,963	6,693.2	$21,915	$52,339	$57,052
Lemon Hill	Sacramento	12,767	7,847.0	$12,076	$27,101	$27,729
Lemoore	Kings	24,788	2,910.4	$23,836	$52,701	$56,775
Lemoore Station	Kings	6,913	1,643.6	$19,113	$44,632	$44,412
Lennox	Los Angeles	22,039	20,163.8	$12,057	$36,573	$36,126
Lenwood	San Bernardino	3,153	1,424.1	$16,243	$42,727	$57,232
Leona Valley	Los Angeles	1,697	91.3	$37,427	$77,582	$79,891
Lewiston	Trinity	1,480	74.0	$24,563	$33,929	$43,750
Lexington Hills	Santa Clara	2,367	501.7	$57,392	$125,893	$147,188
Likely	Modoc	31	23.3			
Lincoln	Placer	44,397	2,209.6	$32,182	$70,870	$79,017
Lincoln Village	San Joaquin	3,996	5,429.3	$23,073	$55,125	$60,521
Linda	Yuba	18,634	2,169.5	$14,131	$36,063	$37,872
Lindcove	Tulare	520	762.5	$15,402	$45,625	$43,750
Linden	San Joaquin	1,948	262.9	$38,334	$87,585	$83,125
Lindsay	Tulare	12,688	4,861.3	$10,678	$30,198	$30,466
Linnell Camp	Tulare	561	4,794.9	$6,902	$20,556	$21,278
Litchfield	Lassen	129	32.7	$31,985	$49,688	$43,068
Little Grass Valley	Plumas	0	0.0			
Little River	Mendocino	38	22.7	$24,705		
Littlerock	Los Angeles	2,040	1,106.9	$10,711	$39,745	$39,676
Live Oak	Santa Cruz	17,494	5,394.4	$31,432	$64,957	$82,611
Live Oak	Sutter	8,500	2,723.5	$16,936	$42,349	$46,758
Livermore	Alameda	83,901	3,122.9	$42,594	$99,683	$111,950
Livingston	Merced	13,461	3,660.9	$13,604	$50,674	$51,912
Lockeford	San Joaquin	3,172	380.3	$25,079	$45,698	$47,639
Lockwood	Monterey	389	35.8	$36,450	$94,615	$75,089
Lodi	San Joaquin	63,158	4,619.9	$23,648	$48,662	$54,740
Lodoga	Colusa	147	43.4	$31,301	$50,000	$68,333
Loleta	Humboldt	661	311.2	$22,226	$41,094	$53,750
Loma Linda	San Bernardino	23,648	3,146.4	$31,239	$58,259	$68,223
Loma Mar	San Mateo	211	121.6	$32,991	$93,810	$117,813
Loma Rica	Yuba	2,537	137.2	$27,252	$64,615	$68,984
Lomita	Los Angeles	20,539	10,747.8	$28,593	$57,245	$66,541
Lompico	Santa Cruz	900	266.7	$56,476	$72,215	$98,500
Lompoc	Santa Barbara	43,045	3,712.7	$20,151	$47,908	$51,195
London	Tulare	2,080	3,306.8	$8,026	$24,816	$25,577
Lone Pine	Inyo	2,017	106.0	$21,830	$31,838	$39,167
Long Barn	Tuolumne	291	101.1	$20,712	$24,388	
Long Beach	Los Angeles	468,594	9,315.8	$27,014	$52,944	$59,710
Lookout	Modoc	67	12.6	$17,072	$36,635	
Loomis	Placer	6,589	906.8	$33,354	$82,813	$95,217
Los Alamitos	Orange	11,598	2,883.6	$36,367	$82,258	$89,271
Los Alamos	Santa Barbara	1,166	301.4	$36,571	$62,429	$60,625
Los Altos	Santa Clara	29,762	4,597.2	$84,705	$157,500	$190,938
Los Altos Hills	Santa Clara	8,244	923.8	$123,127	$224,271	
Los Angeles	Los Angeles	3,862,210	8,240.8	$28,320	$49,682	$54,171
Los Banos	Merced	36,626	3,665.2	$17,160	$45,665	$46,748
Los Berros	San Luis Obispo	908	361.5	$19,596	$60,958	$61,979
Los Gatos	Santa Clara	30,163	2,701.3	$72,050	$122,860	$157,796
Los Molinos	Tehama	2,184	995.4	$18,205	$36,466	$42,990
Los Olivos	Santa Barbara	913	371.3	$58,133	$89,667	$129,875
Los Osos	San Luis Obispo	14,778	1,157.9	$34,229	$56,860	$72,625
Los Ranchos	San Luis Obispo	1,676	592.4	$47,842	$96,705	$111,296
Lost Hills	Kern	2,194	395.2	$8,418	$31,875	$30,125
Lower Lake	Lake	1,620	607.4	$17,614	$31,781	$54,028
Loyalton	Sierra	874	2,462.0	$21,614	$43,000	$46,375
Loyola	Santa Clara	3,463	2,399.9	$98,398	$210,882	$238,177
Lucas Valley-Marinwood	Marin	6,168	1,077.0	$59,579	$129,389	$145,491
Lucerne	Lake	3,318	666.5	$11,901	$20,784	$35,571
Lucerne Valley	San Bernardino	5,767	54.6	$17,984	$34,024	$46,383
Lynwood	Los Angeles	70,789	14,625.8	$12,580	$41,930	$41,332
Lytle Creek	San Bernardino	1,127	187.3	$26,927	$71,000	$81,048
Mabie	Plumas	52	14.3	$42,662		
McArthur	Shasta	308	307.7	$30,152	$42,935	$44,348
McClellan Park	Sacramento	1,103	272.9	$13,962	$23,977	$24,115
McClenney Tract	Tulare	6	9.7	$7,150		
McCloud	Siskiyou	1,111	458.7	$19,429	$31,071	$50,888
Macdoel	Siskiyou	111	750.0	$14,183	$28,500	
McFarland	Kern	12,784	4,791.6	$9,518	$34,750	$33,549
McGee Creek	Mono	125	31.2	$93,233	$91,860	
McKinleyville	Humboldt	16,448	790.9	$25,701	$50,298	$60,833
McKittrick	Kern	112	42.8	$20,728	$43,000	$43,500
McSwain	Merced	4,531	750.4	$35,273	$98,519	$106,736
Madera	Madera	62,559	3,962.2	$14,460	$42,027	$43,600
Madera Acres	Madera	9,653	1,326.0	$18,180	$60,529	$61,056
Madison	Yolo	526	340.2	$17,946	$51,875	$53,393
Mad River	Trinity	398	11.5	$19,148	$34,907	$46,875
Magalia	Butte	11,467	818.2	$20,818	$39,514	$43,457
Malaga	Fresno	935	3,412.4	$10,696	$38,350	$39,800
Malibu	Los Angeles	12,830	648.3	$95,212	$130,432	$169,241
Mammoth Lakes	Mono	8,154	327.9	$27,170	$60,984	$68,750
Manchester	Mendocino	193	73.7	$16,462	$29,118	$26,691
Manhattan Beach	Los Angeles	35,534	9,025.7	$81,787	$142,071	$177,532
Manila	Humboldt	673	1,029.1	$22,212	$32,997	$51,094
Manteca	San Joaquin	70,693	3,440.6	$23,806	$62,032	$67,043
Manton	Tehama	341	19.3	$23,833	$31,250	$34,750
March ARB	Riverside	1,129	94.5	$41,980	$68,261	$104,013
Maricopa	Kern	1,158	771.0	$17,853	$33,750	$43,646
Marina	Monterey	20,198	2,273.8	$24,773	$53,828	$63,477
Marina del Rey	Los Angeles	9,157	10,647.7	$71,023	$101,860	$105,762
Marin City	Marin	2,958	5,508.4	$25,543	$39,872	$41,917
Mariposa	Mariposa	1,524	501.8	$18,842	$34,881	$41,422
Markleeville	Alpine	268	41.0	$33,723	$70,511	$71,591
Martell	Amador	94	40.2	$28,057	$13,508	
Martinez	Contra Costa	36,876	2,919.5	$39,701	$85,736	$100,577
Marysville	Yuba	12,144	3,505.8	$18,146	$34,942	$45,274
Matheny	Tulare	1,098	2,565.4	$14,644	$31,208	$31,250
Mather	Sacramento	4,806	479.4	$30,130	$86,705	$88,452
Maxwell	Colusa	1,076	500.5	$19,794	$44,625	$55,833
Mayfair	Fresno	4,512	8,710.4	$14,620	$40,625	$47,278
Mayflower Village	Los Angeles	5,779	8,411.9	$30,295	$72,034	$83,885
Maywood	Los Angeles	27,703	23,517.0	$11,656	$36,492	$37,342
Meadowbrook	Riverside	3,447	502.5	$13,817	$34,815	$36,964
Meadow Valley	Plumas	435	51.1	$33,823	$51,944	$85,500
Meadow Vista	Placer	3,072	581.7	$37,474	$71,007	$87,026
Mead Valley	Riverside	19,851	1,034.1	$14,010	$41,962	$44,475
Mecca	Riverside	8,912	1,280.6	$8,504	$26,473	$27,265
Meiners Oaks	Ventura	3,634	2,581.0	$29,168	$70,430	$81,154
Mendocino	Mendocino	826	366.0	$42,196	$51,917	$104,732
Mendota	Fresno	11,360	3,446.6	$8,642	$25,229	$26,250
Menifee	Riverside	81,658	1,757.1	$23,165	$56,671	$64,431
Menlo Park	San Mateo	32,792	3,354.7	$69,802	$115,650	$156,439
Mentone	San Bernardino	9,388	1,524.0	$23,376	$55,682	$62,476
Merced	Merced	80,490	3,465.5	$17,623	$38,917	$43,809
Meridian	Sutter	438	82.7	$28,966	$50,000	$82,692
Mesa	Inyo	442	126.2	$37,789	$82,266	$97,500
Mesa Verde	Riverside	1,004	231.2	$13,468	$37,891	$34,583
Mesa Vista	Alpine	212	43.5	$25,200	$61,364	$79,063
Mettler	Kern	88	377.7	$15,591	$42,917	$51,250
Mexican Colony	Kern	216	6,750.0	$7,247	$17,375	$15,500
Middletown	Lake	1,073	581.9	$29,725	$48,965	$100,625
Midpines	Mariposa	689	28.1	$36,067	$41,063	$40,469
Midway City	Orange	9,104	15,023.1	$18,658	$45,581	$51,882
Milford	Lassen	116	21.9	$42,773	$64,961	$64,961
Millbrae	San Mateo	22,177	6,823.7	$43,518	$91,846	$106,051
Mill Valley	Marin	14,178	2,976.7	$87,627	$132,192	$167,061
Millville	Shasta	861	107.0	$26,947	$59,375	$66,818
Milpitas	Santa Clara	69,346	5,106.1	$34,237	$99,072	$102,005
Mineral	Tehama	222	5.0	$32,623	$52,500	$70,000
Minkler	Fresno	1,066	181.8	$36,435	$81,339	$128,482
Mira Monte	Ventura	7,306	1,598.7	$39,022	$70,905	$96,250
Miranda	Humboldt	536	358.8	$30,378	$50,144	$36,250
Mission Canyon	Santa Barbara	2,531	1,668.4	$56,986	$112,717	$128,438
Mission Hills	Santa Barbara	3,415	2,778.7	$36,137	$81,250	$84,119
Mission Viejo	Orange	95,246	5,403.4	$41,513	$98,157	$110,723
Mi-Wuk Village	Tuolumne	1,069	384.8	$26,306	$49,458	$63,036
Modesto	Stanislaus	205,984	4,619.8	$23,034	$47,607	$55,289
Mohawk Vista	Plumas	109	9.1	$75,039	$58,500	
Mojave	Kern	4,172	71.6	$15,847	$34,500	$40,484
Mokelumne Hill	Calaveras	635	206.2	$39,304	$62,396	$80,250
Monmouth	Fresno	184	597.4	$15,705	$34,500	$44,861
Mono City	Mono	67	12.4	$11,106	$31,500	
Mono Vista	Tuolumne	1,979	697.8	$24,568	$46,250	$49,412
Monrovia	Los Angeles	37,035	2,722.2	$34,668	$72,034	$86,034
Monson	Tulare	191	388.2	$14,281	$41,667	$83,083
Montague	Siskiyou	1,504	845.9	$20,433	$42,500	$54,545
Montalvin Manor	Contra Costa	3,055	9,487.6	$22,652	$64,778	$73,864
Montara	San Mateo	2,880	742.7	$49,203	$147,568	$148,273
Montclair	San Bernardino	37,685	6,830.7	$17,881	$48,767	$51,184
Montebello	Los Angeles	63,353	7,602.7	$20,972	$47,562	$55,720
Montecito	Santa Barbara	9,444	1,010.5	$83,226	$130,129	$160,417
Monterey	Monterey	28,053	3,227.5	$36,812	$64,772	$80,615
Monterey Park	Los Angeles	60,966	7,950.7	$24,637	$54,821	$60,209
Monterey Park Tract	Stanislaus	273	5,808.5	$13,645	$90,134	
Monte Rio	Sonoma	1,031	541.5	$27,032	$33,681	$63,854
Monte Sereno	Santa Clara	3,462	2,117.4	$105,597	$187,115	$238,606
Montgomery Creek	Shasta	123	37.8	$27,628	$62,708	$62,917
Monument Hills	Yolo	1,469	364.7	$47,489	$112,344	$112,422
Moorpark	Ventura	35,033	2,785.0	$37,016	$99,353	$108,628
Morada	San Joaquin	4,573	1,534.0	$35,079	$61,270	$71,534
Moraga	Contra Costa	16,549	1,748.4	$60,576	$132,651	$163,951
Moreno Valley	Riverside	198,872	3,878.5	$17,874	$54,229	$55,265
Morgan Hill	Santa Clara	39,875	3,127.7	$40,972	$96,232	$108,037
Morongo Valley	San Bernardino	3,605	142.9	$21,607	$32,295	$44,787
Morro Bay	San Luis Obispo	10,383	1,957.9	$32,613	$50,914	$66,378
Moskowite Corner	Napa	172	61.2	$20,858	$49,286	$53,750
Moss Beach	San Mateo	3,435	1,530.7	$42,240	$81,622	$107,083
Moss Landing	Monterey	200	502.5	$17,855	$30,500	$37,857
Mountain Center	Riverside	75	39.8	$10,727		
Mountain Gate	Shasta	1,153	582.6	$18,037	$33,906	$53,750
Mountain House	San Joaquin	12,088	3,785.8	$29,092	$106,119	$108,750
Mountain Mesa	Kern	454	546.3	$18,583	$38,250	$39,313
Mountain Ranch	Calaveras	1,369	33.2	$27,714	$38,630	$57,243
Mountain View	Contra Costa	2,299	7,927.6	$27,903	$43,077	$38,400
Mountain View	Santa Clara	76,741	6,398.8	$56,156	$100,028	$119,081
Mountain View Acres	San Bernardino	3,502	2,229.2	$18,119	$55,673	$56,521
Mount Hebron	Siskiyou	88	123.4	$9,728	$25,368	$26,397
Mount Hermon	Santa Cruz	1,027	1,575.2	$31,268	$48,549	$65,893
Mount Laguna	San Diego	12	7.1			
Mount Shasta	Siskiyou	3,331	884.5	$31,179	$43,969	$66,667
Muir Beach	Marin	292	592.3	$86,269	$161,458	$178,333
Murphys	Calaveras	1,884	182.5	$35,424	$46,885	$62,330
Murrieta	Riverside	106,326	3,166.3	$28,719	$74,401	$79,996
Muscoy	San Bernardino	11,674	3,714.3	$9,951	$35,660	$37,012
Myers Flat	Humboldt	57	131.9			
Myrtletown	Humboldt	5,225	2,489.3	$28,725	$61,534	$73,558
Napa	Napa	78,511	4,397.1	$31,185	$64,058	$74,981
National City	San Diego	59,543	8,180.1	$17,143	$39,517	$42,531
Needles	San Bernardino	4,923	159.7	$19,001	$33,045	$42,031
Nevada City	Nevada	3,051	1,394.4	$35,087	$51,685	$51,997
Newark	Alameda	43,635	3,144.9	$31,825	$86,521	$91,103
Newcastle	Placer	1,409	589.0	$26,616	$45,865	$71,912
New Cuyama	Santa Barbara	591	837.1	$14,149	$34,000	$45,625
Newell	Modoc	429	178.2	$6,580	$23,182	$23,466
Newman	Stanislaus	10,553	5,239.8	$16,012	$43,722	$46,780
New Pine Creek	Modoc	84	36.8	$35,398	$31,023	
Newport Beach	Orange	84,792	3,582.4	$105,002	$142,463	
Nicasio	Marin	95	72.8	$39,938	$96,500	$96,000
Nice	Lake	2,156	1,247.7	$20,164	$24,149	$36,325
Nicolaus	Sutter	205	65.3	$50,181	$85,625	$100,417
Niland	Imperial	1,063	2,644.3	$15,828	$17,461	$27,854
Nipinnawasee	Madera	729	236.3	$23,511	$66,397	$66,544
Nipomo	San Luis Obispo	17,115	1,152.3	$27,705	$57,185	$68,900
Norco	Riverside	27,143	1,970.2	$27,702	$85,142	$96,631
Nord	Butte	239	113.5	$18,961	$31,923	$76,250
Norris Canyon	Contra Costa	1,227	346.8	$59,374	$196,726	$205,625
North Auburn	Placer	14,011	1,793.8	$25,077	$48,052	$60,637
North Edwards	Kern	966	75.8	$21,833	$45,658	$53,241
North El Monte	Los Angeles	3,924	9,276.6	$28,164	$69,960	$75,426
North Fair Oaks	San Mateo	15,181	12,650.8	$26,426	$63,343	$53,176
North Gate	Contra Costa	417	633.7	$52,891	$96,333	$96,250
North Highlands	Sacramento	44,899	5,087.7	$17,401	$40,986	$43,243
North Lakeport	Lake	2,676	696.0	$28,998	$52,577	$60,625
North Richmond	Contra Costa	3,926	2,788.4	$16,194	$35,288	$45,703
North San Juan	Nevada	281	116.0	$14,102	$27,417	$28,250
North Shore	Riverside	3,184	284.9	$9,434	$24,853	$30,147
North Tustin	Orange	25,724	3,891.1	$59,863	$123,270	$140,609
Norwalk	Los Angeles	106,455	10,964.6	$19,584	$60,523	$63,688
Novato	Marin	53,451	1,947.7	$44,724	$76,609	$97,081
Nubieber	Lassen	15	20.0	$19,160		
Nuevo	Riverside	7,345	1,084.8	$19,329	$59,464	$64,185
Oakdale	Stanislaus	21,260	3,517.0	$24,832	$53,785	$60,861
Oak Glen	San Bernardino	694	46.7	$24,589	$66,923	$73,750
Oak Hills	San Bernardino	10,308	422.6	$26,761	$74,257	$82,961
Oakhurst	Madera	2,482	413.9	$21,563	$39,709	$46,484
Oakland	Alameda	402,339	7,198.4	$32,566	$52,962	$60,472
Oakley	Contra Costa	37,391	2,355.6	$27,993	$78,597	$83,803
Oak Park	Ventura	14,512	2,742.8	$57,470	$117,326	$134,178
Oak Shores	San Luis Obispo	147	29.0	$61,129	$81,964	$86,364
Oak View	Ventura	4,347	2,215.6	$32,723	$72,137	$79,375
Oakville	Napa	59	43.4	$9,415		
Oasis	Riverside	5,807	295.8	$7,512	$24,293	$24,148
Occidental	Sonoma	1,155	232.6	$54,705	$70,172	$86,083
Oceano	San Luis Obispo	7,355	4,800.9	$20,725	$48,629	$46,545
Oceanside	San Diego	171,400	4,155.0	$27,009	$58,385	$68,203
Ocotillo	Imperial	221	25.0	$6,672	$21,397	
Oildale	Kern	33,879	5,185.8	$17,773	$33,818	$35,843
Ojai	Ventura	7,558	1,738.3	$35,231	$60,714	$90,000
Olancha	Inyo	287	36.6	$26,673	$41,974	$94,583
Old Fig Garden	Fresno	5,186	3,139.2	$41,348	$63,358	$78,060
Old Station	Shasta	52	23.4	$15,327		
Olivehurst	Yuba	13,928	1,867.0	$15,357	$43,044	$44,394
Ontario	San Bernardino	166,892	3,342.3	$18,601	$54,156	$56,017
Onyx	Kern	599	52.3	$16,946	$27,991	$29,330
Orange	Orange	138,980	5,480.7	$31,330	$77,086	$85,123
Orange Cove	Fresno	9,473	5,286.3	$9,734	$27,450	$27,868
Orangevale	Sacramento	34,449	2,991.4	$31,241	$65,288	$80,068
Orcutt	Santa Barbara	30,266	2,720.5	$32,246	$71,830	$81,016
Orick	Humboldt	281	59.2	$34,279	$32,656	$49,583
Orinda	Contra Costa	18,390	1,430.8	$84,985	$166,866	$213,021
Orland	Glenn	7,451	2,557.0	$16,179	$38,425	$45,858
Orosi	Tulare	8,620	3,524.1	$10,342	$34,464	$33,819
Oroville	Butte	16,015	1,209.9	$18,777	$36,581	$42,551
Oroville East	Butte	8,782	400.4	$24,851	$52,944	$67,920
Oxnard	Ventura	201,744	7,499.5	$20,651	$62,349	$62,165
Pacheco	Contra Costa	4,295	5,796.2	$30,011	$48,024	$53,083
Pacifica	San Mateo	38,283	3,023.5	$44,886	$96,875	$113,750
Pacific Grove	Monterey	15,365	5,376.1	$46,690	$70,230	$93,302
Pajaro	Monterey	2,957	3,189.9	$8,779	$29,179	$29,643
Pajaro Dunes	Santa Cruz	269	105.0	$59,635	$67,250	$67,000
Palermo	Butte	5,419	185.8	$21,349	$42,371	$55,612
Palmdale	Los Angeles	155,810	1,470.4	$19,438	$54,921	$56,351
Palm Desert	Riverside	49,953	1,863.3	$39,275	$52,053	$68,893
Palm Springs	Riverside	45,827	487.3	$36,126	$45,497	$55,320
Palo Alto	Santa Clara	65,998	2,764.5	$75,257	$126,771	$167,440
Palo Cedro	Shasta	1,626	442.0	$35,654	$81,000	$84,643
Palos Verdes Estates	Los Angeles	13,568	2,842.1	$87,408	$171,328	$203,241
Palo Verde	Imperial	17	28.8			
Panorama Heights	Tulare	38	80.0	$22,153	$22,500	$41,250
Paradise	Butte	26,246	1,432.8	$24,573	$41,482	$56,119
Paradise	Mono	235	54.0	$35,874	$48,864	$80,000
Paradise Park	Santa Cruz	542	1,942.7	$39,762	$62,125	$66,875
Paramount	Los Angeles	54,813	11,588.4	$14,168	$43,784	$43,997
Parklawn	Stanislaus	1,191	7,174.7	$13,110	$42,105	$43,606
Parksdale	Madera	3,114	1,719.5	$8,111	$30,069	$29,604
Parkway	Sacramento	14,756	6,102.6	$15,622	$33,959	$34,570
Parkwood	Madera	2,879	4,124.6	$10,280	$31,908	$27,438
Parlier	Fresno	14,750	6,452.3	$11,039	$31,832	$30,729
Pasadena	Los Angeles	139,065	6,050.8	$41,268	$70,845	$88,600
Pasatiempo	Santa Cruz	1,016	1,149.3	$98,473	$175,536	$183,457
Paskenta	Tehama	52	48.1	$15,448	$36,250	$42,750
Patterson	Stanislaus	20,736	3,482.7	$18,774	$54,422	$58,184
Patterson Tract	Tulare	2,041	1,411.5	$15,433	$37,688	$39,500
Patton Village	Lassen	592	178.2	$26,548	$46,477	$47,386
Paxton	Plumas	0	0.0			
Paynes Creek	Tehama	41	12.0	$28,341	$44,375	$93,125
Pearsonville	Inyo	23	5.6	$26,096		
Penngrove	Sonoma	2,928	727.6	$49,672	$73,430	$104,271
Penn Valley	Nevada	1,599	753.9	$20,243	$43,750	$58,553
Penryn	Placer	946	518.4	$37,080	$80,213	$78,315
Perris	Riverside	71,377	2,273.6	$13,516	$48,591	$48,265
Pescadero	San Mateo	1,046	259.8	$24,750	$61,161	$57,656
Petaluma	Sonoma	58,912	4,096.2	$35,239	$80,590	$89,400
Peters	San Joaquin	523	207.0	$56,941	$116,616	$117,195
Phelan	San Bernardino	12,947	215.4	$22,355	$53,093	$59,804
Phillipsville	Humboldt	77	107.7	$27,396	$23,860	
Philo	Mendocino	317	155.6	$11,234	$16,667	$29,333
Phoenix Lake	Tuolumne	4,712	427.9	$34,735	$75,434	$92,652
Pico Rivera	Los Angeles	63,698	7,678.2	$18,643	$56,576	$62,987
Piedmont	Alameda	10,957	6,445.3	$101,794	$212,222	$247,171
Pierpoint	Tulare	23	56.4			
Pike	Sierra	126	29.2	$23,885	$35,714	$35,000
Pine Canyon	Monterey	2,243	672.4	$26,633	$46,683	$47,043
Pine Flat	Tulare	130	111.9	$26,923	$30,625	$62,143
Pine Grove	Amador	1,865	267.7	$30,314	$48,571	$64,375
Pine Hills	Humboldt	3,160	312.3	$32,080	$52,438	$56,406
Pine Mountain Club	Kern	1,890	112.1	$34,312	$45,911	$57,872
Pine Mountain Lake	Tuolumne	2,422	127.7	$31,321	$51,604	$59,848
Pine Valley	San Diego	1,554	217.3	$35,479	$100,085	$100,557
Pinole	Contra Costa	18,754	3,641.6	$34,219	$74,379	$82,679
Piñon Hills	San Bernardino	6,654	207.2	$25,501	$42,210	$57,723
Pioneer	Amador	1,237	287.3	$35,596	$42,614	$75,104
Piru	Ventura	2,078	736.9	$17,001	$46,601	$47,281
Pismo Beach	San Luis Obispo	7,789	2,164.2	$37,657	$67,500	$88,041
Pittsburg	Contra Costa	65,761	3,826.0	$23,330	$60,376	$64,521
Pixley	Tulare	3,769	1,210.3	$9,889	$28,179	$29,702
Placentia	Orange	51,860	7,840.9	$30,218	$79,275	$87,403
Placerville	El Dorado	10,415	1,792.0	$24,801	$46,199	$59,158
Plainview	Tulare	858	2,776.7	$6,873	$25,938	$26,042
Planada	Merced	4,465	2,831.3	$13,072	$35,690	$36,056
Pleasant Hill	Contra Costa	33,842	4,782.6	$43,580	$81,556	$108,900
Pleasanton	Alameda	73,164	2,995.2	$50,972	$123,608	$140,311
Pleasure Point	Santa Cruz	6,004	7,973.4	$38,471	$57,462	$60,078
Plumas Eureka	Plumas	265	66.7	$56,948	$63,611	$63,472
Plumas Lake	Yuba	6,380	760.9	$24,080	$78,333	$75,400
Plymouth	Amador	1,185	1,272.8	$20,681	$44,531	$56,042
Point Arena	Mendocino	405	300.0	$18,534	$30,000	$47,500
Point Reyes Station	Marin	848	234.5	$39,984	$36,597	$88,098
Pollock Pines	El Dorado	6,540	824.9	$31,164	$49,044	$57,396
Pomona	Los Angeles	151,142	6,585.1	$17,041	$48,993	$50,475
Ponderosa	Tulare	100	123.0	$61,992		
Poplar-Cotton Center	Tulare	2,764	2,154.3	$9,980	$21,434	$21,500
Port Costa	Contra Costa	302	1,911.4	$54,767	$94,018	$88,859
Porterville	Tulare	54,949	3,120.7	$17,330	$41,267	$43,657
Port Hueneme	Ventura	21,949	4,931.3	$22,352	$52,826	$54,966
Portola	Plumas	2,710	501.2	$21,747	$34,134	$36,375
Portola Valley	San Mateo	4,478	492.2	$152,128	$182,381	
Posey	Tulare	8	22.4	$15,638		
Poso Park	Tulare	4	90.9			
Potrero	San Diego	693	220.1	$12,354	$29,554	$37,878
Potter Valley	Mendocino	509	126.3	$24,767	$64,500	$91,442
Poway	San Diego	49,040	1,254.9	$40,681	$96,315	$109,110
Prattville	Plumas	12	19.9			
Princeton	Colusa	232	126.4	$29,977	$63,929	$75,938
Proberta	Tehama	280	195.7	$24,271	$34,477	$33,727
Prunedale	Monterey	18,574	403.3	$29,138	$72,933	$79,802
Quartz Hill	Los Angeles	11,002	2,923.7	$24,681	$53,929	$61,990
Quincy	Plumas	1,439	340.8	$27,394	$46,875	$67,708
Rackerby	Butte	139	47.1	$25,837	$48,125	$53,750
Rail Road Flat	Calaveras	369	11.2	$20,788	$29,922	$34,145
Rainbow	San Diego	1,678	152.0	$30,720	$54,408	$76,250
Raisin City	Fresno	232	305.3	$10,661	$18,750	$12,143
Ramona	San Diego	21,578	561.8	$24,863	$62,919	$69,171
Rancho Calaveras	Calaveras	5,736	684.8	$24,281	$56,607	$62,371
Rancho Cordova	Sacramento	67,167	1,927.2	$24,462	$53,563	$58,979
Rancho Cucamonga	San Bernardino	170,170	4,268.8	$31,528	$77,061	$88,529
Rancho Mirage	Riverside	17,634	720.8	$62,814	$71,688	$99,677
Rancho Murieta	Sacramento	5,804	488.3	$53,085	$103,750	$116,284
Rancho Palos Verdes	Los Angeles	42,282	3,140.1	$57,201	$120,697	$137,506
Rancho San Diego	San Diego	21,514	2,472.6	$38,339	$80,591	$92,779
Rancho Santa Fe	San Diego	2,838	422.6	$68,119	$101,250	$132,054
Rancho Santa Margarita	Orange	48,758	3,780.6	$42,768	$104,952	$120,863
Rancho Tehama	Tehama	2,300	197.6	$14,720	$26,046	$23,787
Randsburg	Kern	128	67.2	$27,320	$26,813	
Red Bluff	Tehama	14,069	1,860.2	$16,505	$32,393	$37,926
Red Corral	Amador	1,601	274.0	$23,210	$30,431	$65,469
Redcrest	Humboldt	52	87.0	$17,604	$28,750	$21,875
Redding	Shasta	90,725	1,521.0	$23,893	$43,773	$56,506
Redlands	San Bernardino	69,787	1,936.9	$31,745	$67,112	$85,484
Redondo Beach	Los Angeles	67,511	10,892.4	$52,775	$103,064	$123,561
Redway	Humboldt	1,132	904.9	$19,209	$37,882	$50,758
Redwood City	San Mateo	79,736	4,099.1	$42,063	$81,955	$98,149
Redwood Valley	Mendocino	1,814	663.0	$22,656	$78,340	$72,577
Reedley	Fresno	24,858	4,839.0	$16,966	$46,002	$45,891
Reliez Valley	Contra Costa	3,677	1,558.7	$77,832	$126,458	$131,161
Rialto	San Bernardino	101,367	4,536.9	$16,206	$50,277	$52,595
Richfield	Tehama	278	496.4	$25,302	$42,500	$46,000
Richgrove	Tulare	3,006	6,650.4	$8,827	$29,792	$29,750
Richmond	Contra Costa	106,469	3,542.8	$25,769	$54,857	$59,976
Richvale	Butte	86	92.8	$131,735	$77,734	
Ridgecrest	Kern	28,282	1,361.9	$27,954	$61,480	$70,645
Ridgemark	San Benito	3,471	1,350.6	$44,974	$100,690	$117,672
Rio Dell	Humboldt	3,373	1,478.7	$25,645	$39,692	$40,733
Rio del Mar	Santa Cruz	9,240	3,080.0	$53,990	$95,938	$125,740
Rio Linda	Sacramento	14,581	1,470.0	$21,131	$50,873	$55,063
Rio Oso	Sutter	428	65.6	$32,343	$66,250	$90,500
Rio Vista	Solano	7,646	1,152.2	$33,919	$62,616	$70,045
Ripley	Riverside	659	387.4	$10,612	$16,522	$17,917
Ripon	San Joaquin	14,645	2,760.6	$32,213	$75,420	$88,176
Riverbank	Stanislaus	23,310	5,696.5	$20,646	$59,183	$62,366
Riverdale	Fresno	3,881	988.8	$12,580	$48,350	$44,356
Riverdale Park	Stanislaus	922	641.6	$9,263	$26,838	$25,392
River Pines	Amador	309	844.3	$12,511	$48,285	
Riverside	Riverside	313,041	3,856.2	$22,212	$56,089	$63,418
Robbins	Sutter	355	136.9	$19,788	$38,158	$42,750
Robinson Mill	Butte	0	0.0			
Rocklin	Placer	59,002	3,018.8	$35,200	$79,274	$91,946
Rodeo	Contra Costa	9,648	2,575.5	$27,318	$68,701	$78,949
Rodriguez Camp	Tulare	192	730.0	$4,581	$27,596	$28,365
Rohnert Park	Sonoma	41,352	5,904.9	$27,021	$57,557	$71,590
Rolling Hills	Los Angeles	1,689	564.7	$117,241	$218,583	$227,250
Rolling Hills	Madera	921	1,555.7	$37,133	$100,774	$114,107
Rolling Hills Estates	Los Angeles	8,184	2,293.1	$66,681	$136,477	$154,043
Rollingwood	Contra Costa	2,832	16,658.8	$14,782	$48,974	$51,250
Romoland	Riverside	1,682	636.2	$16,795	$61,232	$60,540
Rosamond	Kern	18,658	358.0	$21,792	$59,099	$61,613
Rosedale	Kern	14,826	502.2	$42,818	$111,273	$121,866
Rose Hills	Los Angeles	3,260	7,426.0	$44,614	$94,764	$108,438
Roseland	Sonoma	5,556	5,885.6	$20,167	$53,364	$55,677
Rosemead	Los Angeles	54,457	10,549.6	$17,129	$44,524	$44,868
Rosemont	Sacramento	22,824	5,249.3	$24,417	$54,384	$59,959
Roseville	Placer	124,250	2,943.5	$34,514	$76,712	$94,461
Ross	Marin	2,227	1,431.2	$95,706	$186,477	$200,833
Rossmoor	Orange	10,816	7,009.7	$52,267	$114,239	$135,833
Rough and Ready	Nevada	1,195	376.6	$22,190	$42,268	$75,978
Round Mountain	Shasta	126	75.1	$28,929	$22,115	$34,688
Round Valley	Inyo	436	31.6	$21,687	$45,833	$55,625
Rouse	Stanislaus	1,757	7,382.4	$9,395	$23,618	$23,026
Rowland Heights	Los Angeles	51,597	3,946.2	$25,845	$61,375	$64,678
Running Springs	San Bernardino	4,833	1,149.6	$28,253	$69,412	$80,905
Ruth	Trinity	164	4.2	$19,787	$24,028	$76,250
Rutherford	Napa	219	130.4	$35,604	$62,024	$102,222
Sacramento	Sacramento	476,075	4,861.7	$26,060	$50,013	$57,200
St. Helena	Napa	5,895	1,182.1	$47,794	$78,421	$95,000
Salida	Stanislaus	14,509	2,694.3	$22,428	$72,872	$80,594
Salinas	Monterey	154,077	6,525.9	$17,810	$49,728	$51,426
Salmon Creek	Sonoma	59	53.0	$34,354	$34,783	
Salton City	Imperial	3,867	180.4	$16,319	$33,906	$35,320
Salton Sea Beach	Imperial	757	2,515.0	$13,722	$19,934	$26,944
Samoa	Humboldt	305	364.4	$23,614	$52,778	$49,464
San Andreas	Calaveras	2,829	337.7	$22,518	$40,613	$50,500
San Anselmo	Marin	12,527	4,679.5	$56,821	$100,681	$122,857
San Antonio Heights	San Bernardino	3,097	1,260.0	$57,021	$95,250	$109,766
San Ardo	Monterey	647	1,441.0	$12,899	$42,333	$50,438
San Bernardino	San Bernardino	213,044	3,463.7	$14,759	$38,774	$40,305
San Bruno	San Mateo	42,090	7,707.4	$35,866	$81,420	$89,805
San Buenaventura (Ventura)	Ventura	108,449	4,971.1	$33,180	$66,485	$81,446
San Carlos	San Mateo	29,166	5,278.0	$62,548	$125,747	$158,853
San Clemente	Orange	64,673	3,523.3	$48,063	$91,749	$113,018
Sand City	Monterey	355	631.7	$25,884	$34,659	$34,750
San Diego	San Diego	1,341,510	4,125.3	$33,789	$65,753	$78,414
San Diego Country Estates	San Diego	10,191	604.8	$36,448	$100,849	$103,806
San Dimas	Los Angeles	33,896	2,254.2	$35,345	$78,911	$92,140
San Fernando	Los Angeles	24,050	10,130.6	$17,766	$55,044	$56,482
San Francisco	San Francisco	829,072	17,680.1	$49,986	$78,378	$93,391
San Gabriel	Los Angeles	40,173	9,691.9	$25,047	$56,238	$62,144
Sanger	Fresno	24,587	4,298.4	$16,620	$42,094	$50,206
San Geronimo	Marin	369	244.7	$52,139	$79,485	$89,107
San Jacinto	Riverside	45,497	1,769.1	$17,350	$46,714	$52,111
San Joaquin	Fresno	4,010	3,350.0	$7,519	$25,545	$24,583
San Jose	Santa Clara	986,320	5,586.0	$34,992	$83,787	$92,379
San Juan Bautista	San Benito	2,219	3,121.0	$26,097	$57,717	$59,321
San Juan Capistrano	Orange	35,562	2,498.2	$37,917	$72,568	$82,399
San Leandro	Alameda	87,159	6,530.2	$29,442	$64,279	$76,781
San Lorenzo	Alameda	24,563	8,873.9	$26,755	$74,283	$80,149
San Lucas	Monterey	243	616.8	$13,289	$45,417	$51,250
San Luis Obispo	San Luis Obispo	45,911	3,496.6	$26,377	$44,894	$78,641
San Marcos	San Diego	87,808	3,603.9	$24,789	$56,139	$63,866
San Marino	Los Angeles	13,294	3,529.1	$72,861	$119,300	$154,050
San Martin	Santa Clara	7,081	610.7	$40,075	$107,966	$121,154
San Mateo	San Mateo	100,114	8,253.4	$46,782	$90,087	$106,876
San Miguel	Contra Costa	3,355	3,195.2	$57,644	$136,346	$157,768
San Miguel	San Luis Obispo	2,638	1,571.2	$19,793	$47,875	$42,692
San Pablo	Contra Costa	29,516	11,222.8	$16,874	$42,746	$47,666
San Pasqual	Los Angeles	2,143	8,403.9	$56,601	$103,409	$110,833
San Rafael	Marin	58,588	3,536.4	$46,075	$75,668	$96,660
San Ramon	Contra Costa	73,826	3,971.1	$51,569	$129,062	$151,494
San Simeon	San Luis Obispo	477	598.5	$18,990	$33,889	$53,796
Santa Ana	Orange	331,266	12,203.1	$16,345	$52,519	$50,505
Santa Barbara	Santa Barbara	89,669	4,600.8	$37,692	$65,916	$82,769
Santa Clara	Santa Clara	119,525	6,492.7	$41,222	$93,840	$109,672
Santa Clarita	Los Angeles	179,030	3,395.2	$33,879	$83,178	$90,819
Santa Cruz	Santa Cruz	62,045	4,870.1	$29,177	$61,533	$79,431
Santa Fe Springs	Los Angeles	16,859	1,900.2	$20,761	$51,786	$63,333
Santa Margarita	San Luis Obispo	1,231	2,381.0	$28,335	$51,453	$65,104
Santa Maria	Santa Barbara	101,468	4,454.3	$18,509	$50,753	$52,515
Santa Monica	Los Angeles	91,619	10,887.6	$58,252	$74,534	$113,956
Santa Nella	Merced	1,164	255.3	$19,860	$30,000	$43,281
Santa Paula	Ventura	29,990	6,529.5	$20,303	$53,692	$58,110
Santa Rosa	Sonoma	170,782	4,136.0	$29,890	$60,758	$69,921
Santa Rosa Valley	Ventura	3,422	494.4	$67,083	$162,639	$175,466
Santa Susana	Ventura	989	888.6	$35,603	$87,386	$100,750
Santa Venetia	Marin	5,017	1,370.4	$34,564	$81,583	$98,939
Santa Ynez	Santa Barbara	4,909	955.8	$43,990	$97,911	$99,519
Santee	San Diego	55,435	3,415.6	$30,531	$74,213	$86,397
Saranap	Contra Costa	5,591	4,930.3	$49,107	$102,054	$131,675
Saratoga	Santa Clara	30,627	2,454.3	$77,667	$167,917	$197,332
Saticoy	Ventura	1,212	3,258.1	$11,926	$35,926	$33,207
Sattley	Sierra	74	36.2	$49,272		
Sausalito	Marin	7,043	3,976.8	$89,751	$111,702	$180,898
Scotia	Humboldt	864	1,158.2	$23,080	$54,605	$54,028
Scotts Valley	Santa Cruz	11,711	2,535.9	$44,459	$102,927	$115,324
Seacliff	Santa Cruz	3,373	4,397.7	$33,424	$61,437	$68,271
Seal Beach	Orange	24,477	2,166.7	$46,617	$54,026	$92,352
Sea Ranch	Sonoma	983	60.9	$46,759	$59,375	$77,885
Searles Valley	San Bernardino	1,597	152.2	$22,999	$30,478	$46,023
Seaside	Monterey	33,729	3,650.3	$21,548	$52,538	$53,926
Sebastopol	Sonoma	7,535	4,051.1	$35,094	$52,326	$67,782
Seeley	Imperial	1,214	1,001.7	$13,570	$26,761	$42,708
Selma	Fresno	23,808	4,633.7	$15,292	$43,143	$44,226
Sequoia Crest	Tulare	26	25.4			
Sereno del Mar	Sonoma	51	69.2	$71,720	$123,611	
Seville	Tulare	437	687.1	$9,214	$34,219	$32,813
Shafter	Kern	17,261	617.7	$14,563	$41,107	$41,663
Shandon	San Luis Obispo	1,323	448.5	$22,883	$59,236	$57,639
Shasta	Shasta	1,814	165.2	$31,400	$61,042	$72,400
Shasta Lake	Shasta	10,143	928.8	$20,337	$40,295	$50,343
Shaver Lake	Fresno	735	22.8	$41,103	$80,481	$97,188
Shell Ridge	Contra Costa	1,139	2,648.8	$54,179	$120,163	$121,630
Shelter Cove	Humboldt	516	88.5	$50,193	$23,480	$24,459
Sheridan	Placer	1,465	56.3	$18,223	$47,719	$59,712
Shingle Springs	El Dorado	4,562	555.7	$35,567	$82,788	$82,740
Shingletown	Shasta	2,241	90.9	$23,742	$50,491	$58,856
Shoshone	Inyo	22	0.8	$40,018		
Sierra Brooks	Sierra	418	305.1	$27,876	$41,250	$70,417
Sierra City	Sierra	263	122.3	$64,830	$123,846	$148,000
Sierra Madre	Los Angeles	11,060	3,745.3	$48,923	$90,780	$111,389
Sierra Village	Tuolumne	612	242.4	$24,564	$50,024	$52,091
Sierraville	Sierra	133	26.5	$14,649	$32,500	
Signal Hill	Los Angeles	11,245	5,167.7	$30,387	$67,320	$65,851
Silverado Resort	Napa	1,074	568.0	$89,910	$161,739	$168,869
Silver City	Tulare	0	0.0			
Silver Lakes	San Bernardino	5,706	1,102.8	$26,377	$66,703	$77,791
Simi Valley	Ventura	125,699	3,030.6	$37,279	$89,595	$98,394
Sisquoc	Santa Barbara	276	123.8	$16,611	$43,750	$62,500
Sky Valley	Riverside	2,493	102.5	$21,593	$34,107	$50,391
Sleepy Hollow	Marin	2,584	865.1	$88,551	$189,688	$220,750
Smartsville	Yuba	143	199.4	$19,583	$26,100	$27,400
Smith Corner	Kern	661	3,004.5	$9,508	$36,063	$36,438
Smith River	Del Norte	871	219.4	$15,985	$32,426	$34,583
Snelling	Merced	116	214.8	$24,639	$38,333	$70,750
Soda Bay	Lake	1,369	1,065.4	$32,831	$57,450	$56,716
Soda Springs	Nevada	80	237.4	$22,734	$28,917	
Solana Beach	San Diego	13,146	3,734.7	$59,225	$90,579	$112,217
Soledad	Monterey	26,008	5,892.2	$9,701	$46,010	$46,651
Solvang	Santa Barbara	5,345	2,204.1	$39,334	$66,511	$77,159
Sonoma	Sonoma	10,818	3,942.4	$45,197	$66,951	$96,064
Sonora	Tuolumne	4,844	1,531.5	$25,174	$32,985	$46,597
Soquel	Santa Cruz	10,275	2,234.7	$36,612	$78,703	$95,208
Soulsbyville	Tuolumne	2,020	671.1	$28,916	$74,250	$74,864
South Dos Palos	Merced	2,464	1,605.2	$12,459	$44,180	$50,865
South El Monte	Los Angeles	20,375	7,166.7	$14,926	$44,498	$47,702
South Gate	Los Angeles	95,515	13,200.0	$14,256	$43,526	$44,947
South Lake Tahoe	El Dorado	21,394	2,106.1	$23,865	$41,380	$52,885
South Monrovia Island	Los Angeles	6,929	12,644.2	$17,824	$57,012	$57,329
South Oroville	Butte	6,058	2,065.5	$10,946	$33,605	$33,978
South Pasadena	Los Angeles	25,914	7,610.6	$46,649	$80,479	$107,015
South San Francisco	San Mateo	65,537	7,140.7	$32,269	$78,101	$89,186
South San Gabriel	Los Angeles	8,281	9,941.2	$23,693	$66,958	$72,007
South San Jose Hills	Los Angeles	21,012	13,933.7	$14,020	$58,154	$56,408
South Taft	Kern	1,680	1,561.3	$13,453	$39,784	$40,365
South Whittier	Los Angeles	58,328	10,929.0	$20,659	$64,112	$65,778
Spaulding	Lassen	197	59.2	$26,594	$54,722	$64,643
Spreckels	Monterey	939	7,696.7	$29,268	$80,288	$97,083
Spring Garden	Plumas	0	0.0			
Spring Valley	Lake	1,000	202.6	$17,196	$27,404	$31,354
Spring Valley	San Diego	29,841	4,165.4	$26,104	$64,517	$68,285
Spring Valley Lake	San Bernardino	7,816	2,631.6	$26,121	$59,040	$73,575
Springville	Tulare	502	120.0	$24,696	$35,038	$60,625
Squaw Valley	Fresno	2,450	43.3	$24,659	$63,629	$68,948
Squirrel Mountain Valley	Kern	372	521.7	$39,483	$42,596	$43,990
Stallion Springs	Kern	2,983	181.6	$32,696	$55,903	$63,306
Stanford	Santa Clara	13,506	4,945.4	$30,200	$51,622	$173,750
Stanton	Orange	38,455	12,416.9	$18,870	$45,842	$47,509
Stevenson Ranch	Los Angeles	18,832	2,962.4	$47,057	$114,555	$125,459
Stevinson	Merced	171	151.3	$26,693	$52,250	$72,917
Stinson Beach	Marin	425	294.9	$60,870	$108,571	$123,309
Stirling City	Butte	154	130.8	$31,496	$97,792	$97,792
Stockton	San Joaquin	297,223	4,819.8	$19,927	$45,347	$50,166
Stonyford	Colusa	283	97.7	$19,104	$50,833	$58,750
Storrie	Plumas	0	0.0			
Stratford	Kings	1,301	1,904.8	$9,288	$23,750	$21,579
Strathmore	Tulare	3,626	2,578.9	$9,913	$26,250	$22,398
Strawberry	Marin	5,684	4,312.6	$65,102	$87,870	$103,676
Strawberry	Tuolumne	228	437.6	$16,877		
Sugarloaf Mountain Park	Tulare	0	0.0			
Sugarloaf Saw Mill	Tulare	0	0.0			
Sugarloaf Village	Tulare	9	134.3	$27,122	$21,250	
Suisun City	Solano	28,627	6,973.7	$25,809	$71,306	$76,051
Sultana	Tulare	813	1,831.1	$9,019	$24,282	$24,176
Summerland	Santa Barbara	1,575	794.3	$65,173	$89,050	$106,763
Sunnyside	Fresno	4,159	2,158.3	$31,299	$63,222	$65,323
Sunnyside-Tahoe City	Placer	1,845	545.9	$33,019	$69,330	$93,000
Sunny Slopes	Mono	137	72.7	$69,329	$135,438	
Sunnyvale	Santa Clara	145,921	6,637.9	$48,203	$103,257	$117,982
Sunol	Alameda	956	34.4	$51,704	$82,750	$96,071
Sun Village	Los Angeles	11,613	1,087.5	$17,065	$57,840	$59,753
Susanville	Lassen	16,537	2,081.4	$15,350	$49,430	$69,871
Sutter	Sutter	2,959	974.6	$29,639	$64,671	$64,833
Sutter Creek	Amador	2,271	865.8	$30,601	$41,071	$70,250
Swall Meadows	Mono	259	58.0	$35,984	$72,083	$81,563
Taft	Kern	9,063	593.8	$19,016	$50,991	$56,886
Taft Heights	Kern	2,612	8,824.3	$19,555	$54,505	$53,302
Taft Mosswood	San Joaquin	1,398	2,955.6	$11,291	$31,829	$33,400
Tahoe Vista	Placer	1,332	490.4	$27,463	$53,068	$59,676
Tahoma	El Dorado; Placer	959	369.7	$32,244	$50,568	$53,438
Talmage	Mendocino	1,335	839.6	$20,095	$69,853	$81,944
Tamalpais-Homestead Valley	Marin	10,331	2,205.1	$70,073	$138,598	$162,628
Tara Hills	Contra Costa	4,767	7,168.4	$23,890	$57,708	$62,143
Tarpey Village	Fresno	3,246	4,032.3	$21,394	$58,641	$71,833
Taylorsville	Plumas	185	57.0	$56,136	$76,176	
Tecopa	Inyo	115	6.2	$11,688	$12,000	$20,714
Tehachapi	Kern	13,818	1,399.3	$16,613	$42,654	$57,389
Tehama	Tehama	397	500.0	$22,452	$47,679	$49,286
Temecula	Riverside	104,955	2,820.5	$28,630	$78,535	$86,773
Temelec	Sonoma	1,505	947.7	$65,456	$40,000	$66,304
Temescal Valley	Riverside	24,714	1,282.1	$34,390	$89,259	$96,162
Temple City	Los Angeles	36,006	8,988.0	$27,403	$63,803	$73,210
Templeton	San Luis Obispo	7,753	987.4	$33,281	$72,854	$88,650
Tennant	Siskiyou	115	473.3	$10,137	$14,934	$15,865
Terminous	San Joaquin	409	418.6	$47,117	$53,636	$65,865
Terra Bella	Tulare	2,912	1,070.2	$7,919	$24,489	$25,352
Teviston	Tulare	1,823	839.7	$8,812	$24,267	$22,850
Thermal	Riverside	3,570	377.7	$10,647	$26,344	$23,481
Thermalito	Butte	6,911	544.0	$14,509	$35,156	$35,958
Thornton	San Joaquin	748	350.7	$14,204	$33,500	$33,646
Thousand Oaks	Ventura	128,126	2,321.8	$46,231	$99,115	$116,599
Thousand Palms	Riverside	7,956	336.6	$20,191	$43,813	$45,830
Three Rivers	Tulare	2,278	51.2	$33,420	$43,913	$67,125
Three Rocks	Fresno	51	68.0	$8,131		
Tiburon	Marin	9,100	2,046.8	$99,710	$130,661	$170,915
Timber Cove	Sonoma	132	23.4	$37,758	$34,554	$64,375
Tipton	Tulare	2,327	2,304.0	$9,892	$32,239	$32,716
Tobin	Plumas	12	2.4			
Tomales	Marin	155	466.9	$38,493	$38,480	
Tonyville	Tulare	764	15,280.0	$16,311	$49,934	$49,934
Tooleville	Tulare	387	5,776.1	$13,664	$29,125	$24,766
Topanga	Los Angeles	8,923	466.5	$62,434	$115,518	$125,946
Topaz	Mono	123	40.1	$12,633		
Toro Canyon	Santa Barbara	1,476	412.5	$57,476	$72,500	$103,056
Torrance	Los Angeles	147,181	7,187.3	$36,876	$78,286	$94,077
Tracy	San Joaquin	84,573	3,748.5	$26,121	$74,748	$80,439
Tranquillity	Fresno	897	1,453.8	$11,432	$24,919	$26,528
Traver	Tulare	910	1,079.5	$12,035	$38,359	$31,563
Tres Pinos	San Benito	457	127.1	$40,395	$75,893	$124,000
Trinidad	Humboldt	236	486.6	$34,981	$42,917	$83,750
Trinity Center	Trinity	239	45.7	$24,426	$26,859	$26,830
Trinity Village	Trinity	211	52.6	$25,325	$32,292	$33,571
Trona	Inyo	0	0.0			
Trowbridge	Sutter	184	27.3	$19,087	$52,917	$78,750
Truckee	Nevada	16,191	500.9	$37,117	$72,159	$82,356
Tulare	Tulare	60,663	2,977.3	$18,336	$46,387	$50,690
Tulelake	Siskiyou	1,029	2,509.8	$17,233	$35,208	$35,227
Tuolumne City	Tuolumne	1,824	782.2	$21,238	$33,030	$34,821
Tupman	Kern	176	333.3	$16,889	$45,313	$45,938
Turlock	Stanislaus	69,875	4,127.8	$22,847	$51,594	$59,645
Tustin	Orange	77,765	6,988.2	$31,392	$71,105	$77,327
Tuttle	Merced	17	9.7			
Tuttletown	Tuolumne	949	129.1	$35,006	$47,794	$60,724
Twain	Plumas	0	0.0			
Twain Harte	Tuolumne	2,374	641.8	$29,206	$43,625	$58,939
Twentynine Palms	San Bernardino	25,601	432.9	$20,510	$40,890	$42,914
Twin Lakes	Santa Cruz	5,212	7,553.6	$33,493	$50,933	$72,432
Ukiah	Mendocino	15,956	3,416.7	$23,443	$42,237	$53,145
Union City	Alameda	71,675	3,694.6	$30,158	$82,564	$93,050
University of California, Davis	Yolo	6,735	4,603.6	$6,412	$25,462	$29,095
University of California, Merced	Merced	0	0.0			
Upland	San Bernardino	75,089	4,808.2	$29,064	$61,551	$68,353
Upper Lake	Lake	755	448.9	$18,717	$32,438	$47,880
Vacaville	Solano	93,994	3,311.6	$30,111	$74,207	$85,931
Valinda	Los Angeles	23,818	11,826.2	$17,809	$66,697	$67,367
Vallecito	Calaveras	573	66.9	$28,131	$83,487	$84,375
Vallejo	Solano	118,078	3,849.8	$25,945	$58,472	$67,543
Valle Vista	Riverside	15,995	2,328.9	$20,501	$40,010	$46,584
Valley Acres	Kern	717	173.9	$28,066	$47,466	$60,938
Valley Center	San Diego	9,872	360.0	$31,746	$85,176	$94,094
Valley Ford	Sonoma	167	63.2	$9,490	$9,312	
Valley Home	Stanislaus	292	284.9	$16,302	$36,964	$37,321
Valley Ranch	Plumas	68	59.8	$44,196	$115,000	$115,000
Valley Springs	Calaveras	3,631	367.8	$28,566	$67,827	$71,964
Valley Wells	Inyo	0	0.0			
Val Verde	Los Angeles	2,550	994.2	$19,594	$68,017	$69,856
Vandenberg AFB	Santa Barbara	3,464	157.2	$20,710	$61,308	$60,260
Vandenberg Village	Santa Barbara	7,133	1,359.4	$34,667	$77,551	$98,265
Verdi	Sierra	92	22.0	$11,680	$4,853	
Vernon	Los Angeles	59	11.9	$19,973	$38,500	$38,250
Victor	San Joaquin	605	482.1	$7,873	$19,259	$35,250
Victorville	San Bernardino	119,603	1,631.0	$15,873	$47,142	$50,608
View Park-Windsor Hills	Los Angeles	11,374	6,178.2	$44,586	$76,461	$109,939
Villa Park	Orange	5,911	2,843.2	$65,733	$150,864	$157,910
Vina	Tehama	161	119.1	$17,404	$26,250	$24,821
Vincent	Los Angeles	17,687	12,015.6	$20,142	$76,682	$74,880
Vine Hill	Contra Costa	4,296	2,860.2	$21,948	$62,857	$65,729
Vineyard	Sacramento	25,640	1,490.4	$26,688	$76,084	$78,987
Visalia	Tulare	126,942	3,407.1	$22,885	$52,262	$56,766
Vista	San Diego	96,181	5,148.9	$21,161	$47,782	$53,505
Vista Santa Rosa	Riverside	2,815	174.6	$15,530	$52,713	$49,688
Volcano	Amador	0	0.0			
Volta	Merced	257	58.8	$19,853	$42,464	$63,500
Walker	Mono	540	29.3	$39,294	$63,889	$77,461
Wallace	Calaveras	682	157.1	$53,687	$72,120	$105,056
Walnut	Los Angeles	29,822	3,316.5	$35,064	$100,934	$107,750
Walnut Creek	Contra Costa	65,923	3,336.4	$51,998	$80,399	$112,114
Walnut Grove	Sacramento	1,137	111.5	$32,844	$65,463	$70,240
Walnut Park	Los Angeles	16,039	21,442.5	$13,044	$41,202	$41,809
Warm Springs	Riverside	3,163	2,132.8	$20,851	$80,042	$75,714
Warner Valley	Plumas	5	0.3			
Wasco	Kern	25,865	2,744.0	$10,931	$39,273	$40,437
Washington	Nevada	17	8.9			
Waterford	Stanislaus	8,579	3,685.1	$15,757	$44,660	$49,583
Waterloo	San Joaquin	384	70.7	$36,472	$132,125	$143,083
Watsonville	Santa Cruz	52,085	7,787.8	$17,377	$46,691	$48,957
Waukena	Tulare	173	183.7	$18,462	$46,750	$66,094
Wawona	Mariposa	167	26.3	$16,110	$47,656	$7,308
Weaverville	Trinity	3,294	316.0	$24,043	$42,165	$52,712
Weed	Siskiyou	2,937	613.2	$14,202	$29,200	$37,639
Weedpatch	Kern	2,170	610.1	$9,981	$28,075	$28,636
Weldon	Kern	2,604	97.7	$19,074	$30,988	$46,875
Weott	Humboldt	152	202.4	$27,832	$93,393	$93,393
West Athens	Los Angeles	8,615	6,448.4	$16,499	$38,371	$41,473
West Bishop	Inyo	2,865	327.1	$37,527	$83,125	$93,571
West Carson	Los Angeles	20,766	9,164.2	$28,307	$62,414	$72,548
West Covina	Los Angeles	107,441	6,697.9	$24,944	$67,069	$72,751
West Goshen	Tulare	633	537.4	$7,653	$20,350	$14,572
Westhaven-Moonstone	Humboldt	962	118.9	$30,340	$54,261	$60,750
West Hollywood	Los Angeles	35,053	18,576.0	$54,352	$56,025	$70,438
Westlake Village	Los Angeles	8,393	1,618.7	$62,394	$115,550	$145,106
Westley	Stanislaus	853	489.4	$7,011	$18,462	$18,462
West Menlo Park	San Mateo	3,743	7,685.8	$82,841	$169,798	$192,250
Westminster	Orange	91,255	9,086.4	$22,821	$53,660	$57,262
West Modesto	Stanislaus	5,534	2,786.5	$12,356	$27,297	$28,103
Westmont	Los Angeles	30,835	16,685.6	$14,176	$27,072	$31,813
Westmorland	Imperial	1,747	2,961.0	$11,257	$22,372	$24,464
West Park	Fresno	792	442.0	$14,550	$36,389	$38,167
West Point	Calaveras	743	199.8	$17,924	$28,262	$29,022
West Puente Valley	Los Angeles	23,868	12,770.5	$17,005	$62,669	$65,052
West Rancho Dominguez	Los Angeles	21,739	5,470.3	$16,783	$44,909	$48,736
West Sacramento	Yolo	49,946	2,323.5	$25,081	$53,307	$62,905
West Whittier-Los Nietos	Los Angeles	26,590	10,555.8	$19,949	$62,486	$65,326
Westwood	Lassen	1,509	277.6	$20,710	$33,452	$54,135
Wheatland	Yuba	3,494	2,143.6	$21,363	$61,370	$66,347
Whitehawk	Plumas	41	15.9	$37,346	$76,944	
Whitewater	Riverside	469	47.5	$13,003	$15,500	$34,375
Whitley Gardens	San Luis Obispo	166	120.6	$47,110	$85,385	$103,971
Whittier	Los Angeles	86,400	5,898.0	$27,632	$65,583	$74,628
Wildomar	Riverside	33,601	1,418.5	$22,380	$60,816	$63,592
Wilkerson	Inyo	550	96.0	$32,961	$73,125	$76,750
Williams	Colusa	5,166	948.9	$18,878	$54,069	$56,232
Willits	Mendocino	4,853	1,734.5	$18,502	$34,186	$50,233
Willowbrook	Los Angeles	20,897	13,508.1	$11,840	$37,760	$37,750
Willow Creek	Humboldt	1,425	47.0	$18,701	$35,607	$53,523
Willows	Glenn	6,118	2,148.9	$24,044	$38,730	$59,952
Wilsonia	Tulare	0	0.0			
Wilton	Sacramento	4,670	161.0	$36,737	$81,250	$99,135
Winchester	Riverside	2,717	351.4	$26,244	$57,935	$59,293
Windsor	Sonoma	27,113	3,730.5	$33,615	$81,442	$93,921
Winter Gardens	San Diego	20,346	4,593.8	$26,701	$61,759	$66,738
Winterhaven	Imperial	151	618.9	$17,087	$21,793	
Winters	Yolo	6,843	2,331.5	$27,983	$59,856	$67,422
Winton	Merced	11,774	3,871.8	$13,230	$41,091	$41,203
Wofford Heights	Kern	2,043	337.3	$23,742	$30,500	$43,750
Woodacre	Marin	1,778	989.4	$50,853	$88,657	$104,783
Woodbridge	San Joaquin	3,973	1,318.6	$34,483	$72,452	$91,701
Woodcrest	Riverside	15,951	1,397.9	$29,068	$86,095	$88,207
Woodlake	Tulare	7,452	3,227.4	$12,469	$35,509	$37,711
Woodland	Yolo	56,390	3,684.2	$25,149	$54,532	$66,901
Woodlands	San Luis Obispo	448	271.2	$59,986	$79,864	$88,864
Woodside	San Mateo	5,427	462.6	$125,559	$206,528	$242,143
Woodville	Tulare	1,961	450.6	$11,897	$34,750	$31,071
Wrightwood	San Bernardino	4,452	751.3	$29,168	$55,697	$57,139
Yankee Hill	Butte	242	40.2	$21,555	$33,500	$53,875
Yettem	Tulare	285	1,862.7	$7,478		
Yolo	Yolo	561	406.5	$22,830	$75,089	$90,764
Yorba Linda	Orange	66,335	3,434.6	$47,852	$115,994	$128,542
Yosemite Lakes	Madera	4,668	223.3	$34,430	$59,750	$69,583
Yosemite Valley	Mariposa	877	425.9	$26,579	$37,250	$111,875
Yountville	Napa	2,977	1,944.5	$51,554	$65,568	$90,391
Yreka	Siskiyou	7,675	768.7	$18,142	$26,385	$31,728
Yuba City	Sutter	65,141	4,446.8	$23,038	$50,494	$56,734
Yucaipa	San Bernardino	52,406	1,845.2	$26,103	$58,506	$69,098
Yucca Valley	San Bernardino	21,083	526.9	$20,643	$43,086	$53,767
Zayante	Santa Cruz	853	313.0	$31,533	$81,308	$93,490

== See also ==
- California
- California locations by crime rate
- California locations by race
- California locations by voter registration
- Economy of California
- Economy of the United States
- List of U.S. states by income
