= Homewood Canyon-Valley Wells, California =

Unincorporated community in California, United States

Homewood Canyon-Valley Wells
- former census-designated place
- Location in Inyo County and the state of California
- Coordinates: 35°50′39″N 117°20′23″W
- Country: United States
- State: California
- County: Inyo

Area
  - Total: 53.1 sq mi (137.4 km^{2})
  - Land: 53.1 sq mi (137.4 km^{2})
  - Water: 0 sq mi (0 km^{2})

Population (2000)
  - Total: 75
  - Density: 1.3/sq mi (0.5/km^{2})
- Time zone: UTC-8 (Pacific (PST))
  - Summer (DST): UTC-7 (PDT)
- ZIP code: 92328
- Area codes: 442/760
- FIPS code: 06-34407

Homewood Canyon-Valley Wells is a former census-designated place (CDP) in Inyo County, California, United States. The population was 75 at the 2000 census.

Prior to the 2010 census, it was dissolved into Homewood Canyon CDP and Valley Wells CDP.

== Geography ==
Homewood Canyon-Valley Wells is located at 35°50′39″N 117°20′23″W (35.844162, -117.339850).

According to the United States Census Bureau, the CDP had a total area of 53.0 square miles (137 km^{2}), all of it land.

== Demographics ==
Historical population
Census	Pop.	Note	%±
2000	75		—
U.S. Decennial Census; 1860–1870 1880-1890; 1900 1910 1920; 1930 1940 1950; 1960 1970 1980; 1990 2000 2010

Homewood Canyon-Valley Wells first appeared as a census designated place in the 2000 U.S. census. It was divided into the Homewood Canyon CDP, Trona CDP, and the Valley Wells CDP prior to the 2010 U.S. census.

=== 2000 ===
As of the census of 2000, there were 75 people, 35 households, and 24 families residing in the CDP. The population density was 1.4 inhabitants per square mile (0.54/km^{2}). There were 58 housing units at an average density of 1.1 per square mile (0.42/km^{2}). The racial makeup of the CDP was 93.33% White, 1.33% Asian, and 5.33% from two or more races. 6.67% of the population were Hispanic or Latino of any race.

There were 35 households, out of which 17.1% had children under the age of 18 living with them, 54.3% were married couples living together, 5.7% had a female householder with no husband present, and 28.6% were non-families. 25.7% of all households were made up of individuals, and 20.0% had someone living alone who was 65 years of age or older. The average household size was 2.14 and the average family size was 2.44.

In the CDP, the population was spread out, with 17.3% under the age of 18, 2.7% from 18 to 24, 17.3% from 25 to 44, 33.3% from 45 to 64, and 29.3% who were 65 years of age or older. The median age was 52 years. For every 100 females, there were 87.5 males. For every 100 females age 18 and over, there were 82.4 males.

The median income for a household in the CDP was $12,109, and the median income for a family was $12,109. Males had a median income of $0 versus $0 for females. The per capita income for the CDP was $7,999. There were 29.6% of families and 21.4% of the population living below the poverty line, including 19.4% of under eighteens and none of those over 64.
