= Trona, Inyo County, California =

Trona
- census-designated place
- Location in Inyo County and the state of California

- Position in California.
- Coordinates: 35°48′54″N 117°20′51″W
- Country: United States
- State: California
- County: Inyo

Area
  - Total: 9.297 sq mi (24.079 km^{2})
  - Land: 9.296 sq mi (24.077 km^{2})
  - Water: 0.00077 sq mi (0.002 km^{2}) 0.0083%
- Elevation: 1,693 ft (516 m)

Population (2020)
  - Total: 11
  - Density: 1.2/sq mi (0.46/km^{2})
- Time zone: UTC-8 (Pacific (PST))
  - Summer (DST): UTC-7 (PDT)
- GNIS feature ID: 2583168

Trona is a census-designated place in Inyo County, California, United States, adjacent to the unincorporated community of Trona in San Bernardino County. The 2020 United States census reported Trona's population was 11.

== Economy ==
Due to its remote nature, Trona's economy revolves around marijuana cultivation and the Trona Airport.

== Demographics ==
Historical population
Census	Pop.	Note	%±
2010	18		—
2020	11		−38.9%
U.S. Decennial Census; 1860–1870 1880-1890; 1900 1910 1920; 1930 1940 1950; 1960 1970 1980; 1990 2000 2010

Trona first appeared as a census designated place in the 2010 U.S. census formed along with the Homewood Canyon CDP and the Valley Wells CDP out of the dissolved Homewood Canyon-Valley Wells CDP.

=== Racial and ethnic composition ===
Trona CDP, California – Racial and ethnic composition Note: the US Census treats Hispanic/Latino as an ethnic category. This table excludes Latinos from the racial categories and assigns them to a separate category. Hispanics/Latinos may be of any race.
Race / Ethnicity (NH = Non-Hispanic)	Pop 2010	Pop 2020	% 2010	% 2020
White alone (NH)	18	11	100.00%	100.00%
Black or African American alone (NH)	0	0	0.00%	0.00%
Native American or Alaska Native alone (NH)	0	0	0.00%	0.00%
Asian alone (NH)	0	0	0.00%	0.00%
Native Hawaiian or Pacific Islander alone (NH)	0	0	0.00%	0.00%
Other race alone (NH)	0	0	0.00%	0.00%
Mixed race or Multiracial (NH)	0	0	0.00%	0.00%
Hispanic or Latino (any race)	0	0	0.00%	0.00%
Total	18	11	100.00%	100.00%

=== 2020 census ===
The 2020 United States census reported that Trona had a population of 11, all White, not Hispanic or Latino. The population density was 1.2 inhabitants per square mile (0.46/km^{2}). The median age was 32.8 years. There were 9 housing units.

== Education ==
The CDP is served by the Trona Joint Unified School District.
