= Homewood Canyon, California =

Homewood Canyon
- Unincorporated Community; Census Designated Place
- Location of Homewood Canyon in Inyo County, California.

- Position in California.
- Coordinates: 35°53′24″N 117°23′11″W
- Country: United States
- State: California
- County: Inyo

Area
  - Total: 10.249 sq mi (26.546 km^{2})
  - Land: 10.249 sq mi (26.546 km^{2})
  - Water: 0 sq mi (0 km^{2}) 0%
- Elevation: 3,074 ft (937 m)

Population (2020)
  - Total: 40
  - Density: 3.9/sq mi (1.5/km^{2})
- Time zone: UTC-8 (Pacific (PST))
  - Summer (DST): UTC-7 (PDT)
- GNIS feature ID: 2583036

Homewood Canyon is a census-designated place (CDP) in Inyo County, California, United States. Homewood Canyon sits at an elevation of 3,074 feet (937 m). The 2020 United States census reported Homewood Canyon's population as 40.

Prior to the 2010 census, the former CDP of Homewood Canyon-Valley Wells was split into Homewood Canyon and Valley Wells.

== Demographics ==
Historical population
Census	Pop.	Note	%±
2010	44		—
2020	40		−9.1%
U.S. Decennial Census; 1860–1870 1880-1890; 1900 1910 1920; 1930 1940 1950; 1960 1970 1980; 1990 2000 2010; 2020

Homewood Canyon first appeared as a census designated place in the 2010 U.S. census formed along with the Valley Wells CDP and the Trona CDP out of the dissolved Homewood Canyon-Valley Wells CDP.

=== Racial and ethnic composition ===
Homewood Canyon CDP, California – Racial and ethnic composition Note: the US Census treats Hispanic/Latino as an ethnic category. This table excludes Latinos from the racial categories and assigns them to a separate category. Hispanics/Latinos may be of any race.
Race / Ethnicity (NH = Non-Hispanic)	Pop 2010	Pop 2020	% 2010	% 2020
White alone (NH)	37	32	84.09%	80.00%
Black or African American alone (NH)	0	0	0.00%	0.00%
Native American or Alaska Native alone (NH)	0	0	0.00%	0.00%
Asian alone (NH)	0	0	0.00%	0.00%
Native Hawaiian or Pacific Islander alone (NH)	0	0	0.00%	0.00%
Other race alone (NH)	0	0	0.00%	0.00%
Mixed race or Multiracial (NH)	1	4	2.27%	10.00%
Hispanic or Latino (any race)	6	4	13.64%	10.00%
Total	44	40	100.00%	100.00%

=== 2020 census ===
The 2020 United States census reported that Homewood Canyon had a population of 40. The population density was 3.9 per square mile (1.5/km^{2}). The racial makeup of Homewood Canyon was 34 (85%) White and six (15%) from two or more races. There were four (10%) Hispanic or Latino people of any race.

There were 18 households, out of which seven (39%) had children under the age of 18 living in them, eight (44%) were married-couple households, four (22%) were cohabiting couple households, zero (0%) had a female householder with no partner present, and six (33%) had a male householder with no partner present. Four households (22%) were one person, and three (17%) were one person aged 65 or older. The average household size was 2.22. There were 11 families (61% of all households).

The age distribution was nine people (23%) under the age of 18, zero people (0%) aged 18 to 24, eight people (20%) aged 25 to 44, 14 people (35%) aged 45 to 64, and nine people (23%) who were 65 years of age or older. The median age was 55.5 years. There were 22 males and 18 females.

There were 34 housing units at an average density of 3.3 per square mile (1.3/km^{2}), of which 18 (53%) were occupied. Of these, 13 (72%) were owner-occupied, and five (28%) were occupied by renters.

== Education ==
The CDP is served by the Trona Joint Unified School District.
