= Valley Wells, California =

Valley Wells
- Unincorporated Community; Census Designated Place
- Location in Inyo County and the state of California

- Location in California Valley Wells (the United States)
- Coordinates: 35°51′25″N 117°20′54″W
- Country: United States
- State: California
- County: Inyo

Area
  - Total: 10.737 sq mi (27.809 km^{2})
  - Land: 10.669 sq mi (27.632 km^{2})
  - Water: 0.068 sq mi (0.177 km^{2}) 0.64%
- Elevation: 2,234 ft (681 m)

Population (2010)
  - Total: 0
  - Density: 0.0/sq mi (0.0/km^{2})
- Time zone: UTC-8 (Pacific (PST))
  - Summer (DST): UTC-7 (PDT)
- GNIS feature ID: 2408400

California Historical Landmark
- Reference no.: 443

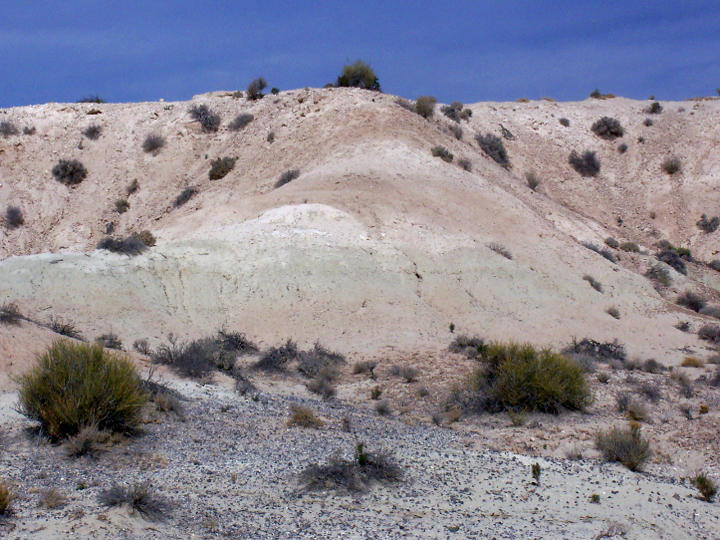
Paleo wetland deposits at Valley Wells

Valley Wells is a census-designated place in Inyo County, California, United States. Prior to 2010, for census purposes it was part of Homewood Canyon-Valley Wells CDP. As of the 2020 census, Valley Wells had a population of 0. The town is now registered as California Historical Landmark #443; in 1849, several groups of midwestern emigrants settled here to secure water from nearby Searles Lake.

The California Historical Landmark reads:

NO. 443 VALLEY WELLS - In this area, several groups of midwestern emigrants who had escaped from hazards and privations in Death Valley in 1849 sought to secure water from Searles Lake. They turned northward and westward in despair when they discovered its salty nature, and with great difficulty crossed the Argus and other mountains to reach settlements of Central and Southern California.

== Recreation ==
Historically, the Valley Wells area was used for aquatic recreation for the residents of Trona.

Valley Wells is the home of the Trona Golf course on Valley Wells Road.

Valley Wells is also the home of the Valley Wells Recreation Area, which is maintained by Searles Lake Gem and Mineral Society, but owned by Searles Valley Minerals, Inc.

== Demographics ==
Historical population
Census	Pop.	Note	%±
2010	0		—
2020	0		—
U.S. Decennial Census; 1860–1870 1880-1890; 1900 1910 1920; 1930 1940 1950; 1960 1970 1980; 1990 2000 2010

Valley Wells first appeared as a census designated place in the 2010 U.S. census formed along with the Homewood Canyon CDP and the Trona CDP out of the dissolved Homewood Canyon-Valley Wells CDP. It belongs to the Lone Pine census county division (CCD).

== Education ==
Valley Wells is served by the Trona Joint Unified School District.

== See also ==
- California Historical Landmarks in Inyo County
- History of California through 1899
