= California locations by crime rate =

2014 Survey of the topic

The following is a list of California locations by crime rate based on FBI's Uniform Crime Reports from 2014.

In 2014, California reported 153,709 violent crimes (3.96 for every 1,000 people) and 947,192 property crimes (24.41 for every 1,000 people). These rates are very similar for the average county and city in California.

== Entire state – 2024 ==
The following table includes the number of incidents reported and the rate per 1,000 persons for each type of offense.

Population	38,802,500	
Violent crime	153,709	3.96
Murder and nonnegligent manslaughter	1,699	0.04
Rape (Note: Revised definition: See Table 5 data declaration)	11,527	0.30
Robbery	48,680	1.26
Aggravated assault	91,803	2.37
Property crime	947,192	24.41
Burglary	202,670	5.22
Larceny-theft	592,670	15.27
Motor vehicle theft	151,852	3.91

== Counties ==
County	Population	Population density (Note: Total population divided by land area in square miles.)	Violent crimes	Violent crime rate per 1,000 persons	Property crimes	Property crime rate per 1,000 persons
Alameda	1,559,308	2,109.8	10,356	6.6	57,620	37.0
Alpine	1,202	1.6	4	3.3	24	20.0
Amador	37,159	62.5	81	2.2	629	16.9
Butte	221,578	135.4	678	3.1	6,631	29.9
Calaveras	44,921	44.0	113	2.5	989	22.0
Colusa	21,424	18.6	40	1.9	350	16.3
Contra Costa	1,081,232	1,496.0	3,650	3.4	32,232	29.8
Del Norte	28,066	27.9	165	5.9	649	23.1
El Dorado	181,465	106.3	409	2.3	3,138	17.3
Fresno	948,844	159.2	4,547	4.8	32,535	34.3
Glenn	28,019	21.3	125	4.5	527	18.8
Humboldt	134,876	37.8	485	3.6	4,787	35.5
Imperial	177,026	42.4	583	3.3	5,536	31.3
Inyo	18,439	1.8	106	5.7	303	16.4
Kern	857,730	105.5	4,465	5.2	28,283	33.0
Kings	151,390	109.0	696	4.6	3,475	23.0
Lake	64,209	51.1	307	4.8	1,832	28.5
Lassen	33,356	7.3	140	4.2	521	15.6
Los Angeles	9,974,203	2,457.9	42,725	4.3	217,493	21.8
Madera	152,452	71.3	888	5.8	3,380	22.2
Marin	256,802	493.4	454	1.8	4,565	17.8
Mariposa	17,946	12.4	71	4.0	276	15.4
Mendocino	87,612	25.0	512	5.8	1,546	17.6
Merced	261,609	135.2	1,485	5.7	7,126	27.2
Modoc	9,335	2.4	49	5.2	166	17.8
Mono	14,193	4.7	36	2.5	184	13.0
Monterey	424,927	129.5	1,833	4.3	10,577	24.9
Napa	139,253	186.1	534	3.8	2,385	17.1
Nevada	98,606	103.0	308	3.1	1,591	16.1
Orange	3,086,331	3,903.6	6,257	2.0	54,754	17.7
Placer	361,518	256.9	596	1.6	6,643	18.4
Plumas	19,286	7.6	91	4.7	312	16.2
Riverside	2,266,899	314.6	6,260	2.8	61,434	27.1
Sacramento	1,450,277	1,503.0	7,452	5.1	40,246	27.8
San Benito	56,888	41.0	196	3.4	736	12.9
San Bernardino	2,078,586	103.6	8,281	4.0	54,778	26.4
San Diego	3,183,143	756.7	10,585	3.3	59,050	18.6
San Francisco	829,072	17,680.1	6,822	8.2	45,936	55.4
San Joaquin	701,050	503.9	5,346	7.6	25,092	35.8
San Luis Obispo	274,184	83.1	1,177	4.3	5,683	20.7
San Mateo	739,837	1,649.7	1,561	2.1	14,186	19.2
Santa Barbara	431,555	157.8	1,294	3.0	9,088	21.1
Santa Clara	1,841,569	1,427.3	4,676	2.5	43,084	23.4
Santa Cruz	267,203	600.2	1,139	4.3	8,121	30.4
Shasta	178,520	47.3	1,275	7.1	5,705	32.0
Sierra	3,019	3.2	11	3.6	29	9.6
Siskiyou	44,261	7.1	137	3.1	724	16.4
Solano	421,624	513.1	2,109	5.0	13,453	31.9
Sonoma	491,790	312.1	1,821	3.7	8,583	17.5
Stanislaus	522,794	349.8	2,826	5.4	18,559	35.5
Sutter	95,067	157.8	316	3.3	2,364	24.9
Tehama	63,284	21.5	321	5.1	1,589	25.1
Trinity	13,515	4.3	34	2.5	174	12.9
Tulare	451,108	93.5	1,903	4.2	11,398	25.3
Tuolumne	54,347	24.5	151	2.8	1,157	21.3
Ventura	835,790	453.5	1,890	2.3	16,812	20.1
Yolo	204,162	201.2	757	3.7	5,507	27.0
Yuba	73,059	115.6	296	4.1	2,135	29.2

== Cities and other agencies ==
There's hardly any correlation between crime rates and population or population density whatsoever for cities in California.

The median city had crime rates slightly lower than that of the state, with a violent crime rate of 2.74 and a property crime rate of 21.66. The fact that the average city had crime rates similar to the state in contrast to the lower median rates indicates the presence of outliers with high crime rates. Indeed, the 66th percentile for violent crime rates was 3.69 crimes per 1,000 people, still not as high as the average crime rate among cities (the 33rd percentile was 1.81).

Irvine ranks second with regard to lowest violent crime rates among places with a population of 50,000 or more even though it has a population roughly five times that. Its violent crime rate is 0.49 per 1,000 people. Joining Irvine among the top five in that population class are San Ramon (0.31), Murrieta (0.63), Cupertino (0.66), and Yorba Linda (0.66). Change the focus to property crime and Orange County cities with a population not much higher than 50,000 dominate the top ten, with seven of the ten places ranking in the top ten being located in Orange County, including (in ascending order of violent crime rate) Aliso Viejo, Laguna Niguel, Lake Forest, Mission Viejo, and Yorba Linda.

Of the ten places with populations over 50,000 and the highest violent crime rates, only two had populations under 100,000: they are Santa Cruz (8.26) and Compton (11.49). The other places include (in descending order of violent crime rate) Oakland, Stockton, San Bernardino, Vallejo, and San Francisco.

City/Agency	County	Population	Population density	Violent crimes	Violent crime rate per 1,000 persons	Property crimes	Property crime rate per 1,000 persons
Adelanto	San Bernardino	31,213	557.3	189	6.06	790	25.31
Agoura Hills	Los Angeles	20,767	2,664.8	17	0.82	234	11.27
Alameda	Alameda	77,048	7,378.7	145	1.88	1,723	22.36
Albany	Alameda	19,350	10,822.1	31	1.6	478	24.7
Alhambra	Los Angeles	84,931	11,129.7	168	1.98	1,743	20.52
Aliso Viejo	Orange	50,671	7,323.5	35	0.69	273	5.39
Alturas	Modoc	2,615	1,073.9	29	11.09	89	34.03
American Canyon	Napa	20,379	3,351.3	55	2.7	568	27.87
Anaheim	Orange	346,956	6,942.3	1,101	3.17	8,196	23.62
Anderson	Shasta	10,176	1,597.0	96	9.43	617	60.63
Angels	Calaveras	3,716	1,024.3	7	1.88	48	12.92
Antioch	Contra Costa	108,223	3,820.1	849	7.84	4,190	38.72
Apple Valley	San Bernardino	71,329	958.2	212	2.97	1,654	23.19
Arcadia	Los Angeles	57,950	5,304.3	60	1.04	1,159	20.0
Arcata	Humboldt	17,748	1,952.0	78	4.39	702	39.55
Arroyo Grande	San Luis Obispo	17,829	3,056.6	52	2.92	356	19.97
Artesia	Los Angeles	16,788	10,356.6	49	2.92	294	17.51
Arvin	Kern	20,541	4,262.5	177	8.62	483	23.51
Atascadero	San Luis Obispo	29,268	1,138.3	72	2.46	448	15.31
Atherton	San Mateo	7,221	1,435.9	3	0.42	75	10.39
Atwater	Merced	28,961	4,736.8	182	6.28	1,024	35.36
Auburn	Placer	14,042	1,962.8	44	3.13	295	21.01
Avalon	Los Angeles	3,784	1,289.3	20	5.29	89	23.52
Avenal	Kings	13,914	716.4	18	1.29	154	11.07
Azusa	Los Angeles	48,224	4,994.2	165	3.42	1,065	22.08
Bakersfield	Kern	367,406	2,473.3	1,678	4.57	14,595	39.72
Baldwin Park	Los Angeles	76,933	11,602.0	219	2.85	1,342	17.44
Banning	Riverside	30,699	1,329.0	128	4.17	619	20.16
Barstow	San Bernardino	23,349	564.8	217	9.29	781	33.45
Beaumont	Riverside	41,323	1,334.4	71	1.72	974	23.57
Bell	Los Angeles	36,059	14,417.8	217	6.02	718	19.91
Bellflower	Los Angeles	77,830	12,721.5	293	3.76	1,623	20.85
Bell Gardens	Los Angeles	43,089	17,523.0	108	2.51	710	16.48
Belmont	San Mateo	26,947	5,826.4	36	1.34	372	13.8
Belvedere	Marin	2,135	4,113.7	1	0.47	36	16.86
Benicia	Solano	27,766	2,147.6	26	0.94	484	17.43
Berkeley	Alameda	117,753	11,251.0	431	3.66	5,102	43.33
Beverly Hills	Los Angeles	34,788	6,094.6	111	3.19	1,071	30.79
Big Bear Lake	San Bernardino	5,148	811.1	44	8.55	262	50.89
Biggs	Butte	1,701	2,674.5	17	9.99	22	12.93
Bishop	Inyo	3,860	2,070.8	27	6.99	128	33.16
Blythe	Riverside	19,669	751.0	88	4.47	748	38.03
Bradbury	Los Angeles	1,084	553.9	2	1.85	9	8.3
Brawley	Imperial	25,695	3,344.8	69	2.69	1,020	39.7
Brea	Orange	41,359	3,392.0	53	1.28	1,124	27.18
Brentwood	Contra Costa	55,826	3,759.1	102	1.83	1,250	22.39
Brisbane	San Mateo	4,482	1,447.7	11	2.45	133	29.67
Broadmoor	San Mateo	4,343	9,629.7	10	2.3	48	11.05
Buellton	Santa Barbara	4,997	3,158.7	6	1.2	71	14.21
Buena Park	Orange	83,414	7,926.1	217	2.6	2,030	24.34
Burbank	Los Angeles	105,041	6,057.4	150	1.43	2,426	23.1
Burlingame	San Mateo	30,161	6,847.0	47	1.56	750	24.87
Calabasas	Los Angeles	24,325	1,774.8	19	0.78	252	10.36
Calexico	Imperial	39,572	4,584.3	96	2.43	1,630	41.19
California City	Kern	13,168	64.7	79	6.0	481	36.53
Calimesa	Riverside	8,238	554.9	17	2.06	259	31.44
Calistoga	Napa	5,277	2,031.2	3	0.57	73	13.83
Camarillo	Ventura	66,272	3,393.0	72	1.09	965	14.56
Campbell	Santa Clara	40,872	7,042.0	81	1.98	1,388	33.96
Canyon Lake	Riverside	10,987	2,809.3	13	1.18	128	11.65
Capitola	Santa Cruz	10,134	6,361.6	30	2.96	627	61.87
Carlsbad	San Diego	112,297	2,976.6	204	1.82	1,731	15.41
Carmel-by-the-Sea	Monterey	3,871	3,584.3	13	3.36	104	26.87
Carpinteria	Santa Barbara	13,654	5,280.0	19	1.39	197	14.43
Carson	Los Angeles	92,838	4,958.5	339	3.65	2,116	22.79
Cathedral City	Riverside	53,368	2,482.2	128	2.4	1,194	22.37
Ceres	Stanislaus	46,903	5,028.2	145	3.09	1,584	33.77
Cerritos	Los Angeles	49,867	5,717.4	86	1.72	1,525	30.58
Chico	Butte	88,562	2,690.1	340	3.84	3,213	36.28
Chino	San Bernardino	81,600	2,750.8	186	2.28	1,816	22.25
Chino Hills	San Bernardino	76,972	1,722.5	61	0.79	1,030	13.38
Chowchilla	Madera	17,079	1,533.5	89	5.21	332	19.44
Chula Vista	San Diego	259,894	5,236.5	612	2.35	4,524	17.41
Citrus Heights	Sacramento	85,758	6,027.0	389	4.54	2,691	31.38
Claremont	Los Angeles	36,042	2,699.8	39	1.08	853	23.67
Clayton	Contra Costa	11,646	3,032.8	4	0.34	111	9.53
Clearlake	Lake	14,914	1,472.4	97	6.5	681	45.66
Cloverdale	Sonoma	8,766	2,887.4	15	1.71	171	19.51
Clovis	Fresno	100,705	4,291.3	216	2.14	3,064	30.43
Coachella	Riverside	43,633	1,507.2	166	3.8	1,152	26.4
Coalinga	Fresno	16,445	2,463.3	121	7.36	315	19.15
Colma	San Mateo	1,503	789.0	12	7.98	271	180.31
Colton	San Bernardino	53,485	3,490.3	137	2.56	1,575	29.45
Colusa	Colusa	5,942	3,239.9	9	1.51	105	17.67
Commerce	Los Angeles	13,033	1,993.4	77	5.91	965	74.04
Compton	Los Angeles	98,224	9,810.6	1,129	11.49	2,619	26.66
Concord	Contra Costa	126,744	4,149.6	465	3.67	5,196	41.0
Corcoran	Kings	23,057	3,072.6	86	3.73	292	12.66
Corning	Tehama	7,569	2,132.1	35	4.62	309	40.82
Corona	Riverside	161,128	4,148.9	171	1.06	3,440	21.35
Coronado	San Diego	23,385	2,948.6	17	0.73	545	23.31
Costa Mesa	Orange	112,709	7,178.9	318	2.82	3,462	30.72
Cotati	Sonoma	7,424	3,948.9	33	4.45	70	9.43
Covina	Los Angeles	48,681	6,926.7	110	2.26	1,108	22.76
Crescent City	Del Norte	7,090	3,611.8	63	8.89	191	26.94
Cudahy	Los Angeles	24,175	20,574.5	81	3.35	332	13.73
Culver City	Los Angeles	39,561	7,740.4	169	4.27	1,693	42.79
Cupertino	Santa Clara	60,564	5,354.4	40	0.66	1,026	16.94
Cypress	Orange	49,370	7,467.9	51	1.03	752	15.23
Daly City	San Mateo	105,628	13,825.7	194	1.84	1,685	15.95
Dana Point	Orange	34,244	5,269.1	71	2.07	463	13.52
Danville	Contra Costa	43,685	2,416.6	17	0.39	439	10.05
Davis	Yolo	66,360	6,714.6	84	1.27	1,455	21.93
Delano	Kern	52,224	3,651.3	215	4.12	1,486	28.45
Del Mar	San Diego	4,305	2,522.0	18	4.18	137	31.82
Del Rey Oaks	Monterey	1,683	3,506.2	1	0.59	52	30.9
Desert Hot Springs	Riverside	28,086	930.0	168	5.98	1,160	41.3
Diamond Bar	Los Angeles	56,665	3,808.4	49	0.86	722	12.74
Dinuba	Tulare	23,815	3,680.8	187	7.85	933	39.18
Dixon	Solano	19,103	2,680.0	53	2.77	428	22.4
Dorris	Siskiyou	899	1,280.6	5	5.56	13	14.46
Dos Palos	Merced	5,081	3,766.5	51	10.04	155	30.51
Downey	Los Angeles	113,595	9,155.0	281	2.47	2,897	25.5
Duarte	Los Angeles	21,817	3,261.1	54	2.48	352	16.13
Dublin	Alameda	53,795	3,531.5	70	1.3	798	14.83
Dunsmuir	Siskiyou	1,569	978.2	5	3.19	17	10.83
East Palo Alto	San Mateo	29,377	11,722.7	124	4.22	574	19.54
Eastvale	Riverside	55,504	4,383.2	59	1.06	929	16.74
El Cajon	San Diego	102,838	7,103.1	327	3.18	2,252	21.9
El Centro	Imperial	43,532	3,927.5	167	3.84	2,095	48.13
El Cerrito	Contra Costa	24,485	6,695.4	77	3.14	926	37.82
Elk Grove	Sacramento	162,957	3,862.2	622	3.82	3,072	18.85
El Monte	Los Angeles	116,220	12,154.4	333	2.87	2,213	19.04
El Paso de Robles (Paso Robles)	San Luis Obispo	31,117	1,625.2	125	4.02	788	25.32
El Segundo	Los Angeles	16,990	3,110.0	48	2.83	538	31.67
Emeryville	Alameda	10,972	8,565.2	117	10.66	1,603	146.1
Encinitas	San Diego	62,071	3,299.5	104	1.68	908	14.63
Escalon	San Joaquin	7,281	3,164.3	10	1.37	171	23.49
Escondido	San Diego	149,839	4,043.3	512	3.42	3,026	20.2
Etna	Siskiyou	715	940.8	0	0.0	1	1.4
Eureka	Humboldt	26,843	2,860.5	145	5.4	2,176	81.06
Exeter	Tulare	10,524	4,272.8	47	4.47	305	28.98
Fairfax	Marin	7,647	3,469.6	16	2.09	104	13.6
Fairfield	Solano	110,300	2,950.1	519	4.71	3,873	35.11
Farmersville	Tulare	10,752	4,761.7	52	4.84	165	15.35
Ferndale	Humboldt	1,360	1,324.2	3	2.21	17	12.5
Fillmore	Ventura	15,311	4,551.4	46	3.0	122	7.97
Firebaugh	Fresno	8,238	2,343.7	75	9.1	299	36.3
Folsom	Sacramento	73,329	3,341.2	79	1.08	1,305	17.8
Fontana	San Bernardino	204,532	4,820.5	710	3.47	3,710	18.14
Fort Bragg	Mendocino	7,245	2,635.5	27	3.73	256	35.33
Fort Jones	Siskiyou	681	1,131.2	0	0.0	16	23.49
Fortuna	Humboldt	11,752	2,425.6	33	2.81	496	42.21
Foster City	San Mateo	32,836	8,650.2	14	0.43	366	11.15
Fountain Valley	Orange	57,024	6,285.7	86	1.51	1,023	17.94
Fowler	Fresno	6,032	2,372.9	49	8.12	158	26.19
Fremont	Alameda	227,575	2,937.8	284	1.25	3,910	17.18
Fresno	Fresno	513,187	4,532.5	2,382	4.64	21,101	41.12
Fullerton	Orange	139,895	6,236.1	339	2.42	3,206	22.92
Galt	Sacramento	24,671	4,115.3	70	2.84	574	23.27
Gardena	Los Angeles	60,233	10,333.3	276	4.58	1,389	23.06
Garden Grove	Orange	176,106	9,807.1	406	2.31	3,098	17.59
Gilroy	Santa Clara	52,415	3,247.1	197	3.76	1,486	28.35
Glendale	Los Angeles	197,079	6,473.5	186	0.94	3,073	15.59
Glendora	Los Angeles	51,292	2,644.1	66	1.29	1,241	24.19
Goleta	Santa Barbara	30,669	3,906.4	35	1.14	422	13.76
Gonzales	Monterey	8,459	4,412.6	37	4.37	86	10.17
Grand Terrace	San Bernardino	12,405	3,542.3	18	1.45	248	19.99
Grass Valley	Nevada	12,777	2,693.9	109	8.53	676	52.91
Greenfield	Monterey	16,986	7,956.0	91	5.36	319	18.78
Gridley	Butte	6,558	3,168.1	88	13.42	167	25.47
Grover Beach	San Luis Obispo	13,497	5,842.9	52	3.85	324	24.01
Guadalupe	Santa Barbara	7,260	5,546.2	10	1.38	68	9.37
Gustine	Merced	5,667	3,653.8	34	6.0	161	28.41
Hanford	Kings	54,824	3,262.6	305	5.56	1,857	33.87
Hawaiian Gardens	Los Angeles	14,490	15,284.8	55	3.8	183	12.63
Hawthorne	Los Angeles	86,670	14,252.6	658	7.59	2,588	29.86
Hayward	Alameda	153,319	3,375.6	605	3.95	4,873	31.78
Healdsburg	Sonoma	11,569	2,595.7	19	1.64	238	20.57
Hemet	Riverside	82,412	2,959.5	430	5.22	3,357	40.73
Hercules	Contra Costa	25,026	3,903.0	27	1.08	286	11.43
Hermosa Beach	Los Angeles	19,873	13,926.4	37	1.86	543	27.32
Hesperia	San Bernardino	92,592	1,266.7	296	3.2	2,303	24.87
Hidden Hills	Los Angeles	1,915	1,133.8	0	0.0	12	6.27
Highland	San Bernardino	54,559	2,909.0	256	4.69	1,309	23.99
Hillsborough	San Mateo	11,382	1,838.8	1	0.09	103	9.05
Hollister	San Benito	36,967	5,047.4	136	3.68	498	13.47
Holtville	Imperial	6,030	5,252.6	24	3.98	86	14.26
Hughson	Stanislaus	7,089	3,587.6	11	1.55	143	20.17
Huntington Beach	Orange	199,152	7,394.1	391	1.96	4,238	21.28
Huntington Park	Los Angeles	59,064	19,603.1	409	6.92	1,806	30.58
Huron	Fresno	6,792	4,269.0	72	10.6	145	21.35
Imperial	Imperial	16,535	2,823.6	5	0.3	46	2.78
Imperial Beach	San Diego	27,234	6,545.1	112	4.11	416	15.28
Indian Wells	Riverside	5,211	363.8	6	1.15	120	23.03
Indio	Riverside	84,540	2,757.6	466	5.51	2,210	26.14
Industry	Los Angeles	205	17.4	72	351.22	1,047	5,107.32
Inglewood	Los Angeles	111,997	12,350.8	783	6.99	2,740	24.46
Ione	Amador	6,773	1,474.0	6	0.89	60	8.86
Irvine	Orange	242,971	3,705.5	120	0.49	3,045	12.53
Irwindale	Los Angeles	1,426	161.6	18	12.62	169	118.51
Isleton	Sacramento	825	1,875.0	2	2.42	23	27.88
Jackson	Amador	4,534	1,215.5	17	3.75	113	24.92
Jurupa Valley	Riverside	98,684	2,298.7	287	2.91	2,586	26.2
Kensington	Contra Costa	5,281	5,576.6	2	0.38	46	8.71
Kerman	Fresno	14,538	4,496.8	38	2.61	458	31.5
King City	Monterey	13,336	3,468.4	55	4.12	243	18.22
Kingsburg	Fresno	11,762	4,165.0	34	2.89	318	27.04
La Cañada Flintridge	Los Angeles	20,627	2,390.7	18	0.87	306	14.83
Lafayette	Contra Costa	25,355	1,685.1	17	0.67	439	17.31
Laguna Beach	Orange	23,371	2,627.7	64	2.74	462	19.77
Laguna Hills	Orange	31,035	4,701.6	45	1.45	441	14.21
Laguna Niguel	Orange	65,033	4,411.7	73	1.12	554	8.52
Laguna Woods	Orange	16,480	4,926.8	6	0.36	118	7.16
La Habra	Orange	61,964	8,425.9	105	1.69	1,049	16.93
La Habra Heights	Los Angeles	5,451	885.0	8	1.47	49	8.99
Lake Elsinore	Riverside	58,665	1,529.8	128	2.18	1,662	28.33
Lake Forest	Orange	79,748	4,793.7	104	1.3	682	8.55
Lakeport	Lake	4,763	1,557.6	17	3.57	335	70.33
Lakewood	Los Angeles	81,382	8,640.2	202	2.48	1,737	21.34
La Mesa	San Diego	59,005	6,499.1	208	3.53	1,584	26.85
La Mirada	Los Angeles	49,277	6,299.8	89	1.81	635	12.89
Lancaster	Los Angeles	160,190	1,698.8	891	5.56	3,661	22.85
La Palma	Orange	15,977	8,960.7	12	0.75	247	15.46
La Puente	Los Angeles	40,583	11,665.1	136	3.35	440	10.84
La Quinta	Riverside	39,753	1,131.5	87	2.19	1,324	33.31
La Verne	Los Angeles	32,067	3,803.9	46	1.43	820	25.57
Lawndale	Los Angeles	33,340	16,889.6	157	4.71	398	11.94
Lemon Grove	San Diego	26,332	6,788.3	125	4.75	516	19.6
Lemoore	Kings	25,080	2,944.7	119	4.74	660	26.32
Lincoln	Placer	45,792	2,279.0	17	0.37	463	10.11
Lindsay	Tulare	13,300	5,095.8	41	3.08	243	18.27
Livermore	Alameda	86,147	3,206.5	236	2.74	1,501	17.42
Livingston	Merced	13,690	3,723.1	50	3.65	245	17.9
Lodi	San Joaquin	63,601	4,652.3	290	4.56	2,095	32.94
Loma Linda	San Bernardino	23,798	3,166.3	41	1.72	689	28.95
Lomita	Los Angeles	20,677	10,820.0	77	3.72	355	17.17
Lompoc	Santa Barbara	43,809	3,778.6	153	3.49	854	19.49
Long Beach	Los Angeles	471,123	9,366.1	2,304	4.89	12,438	26.4
Los Alamitos	Orange	11,708	2,911.0	16	1.37	204	17.42
Los Altos	Santa Clara	30,256	4,673.5	7	0.23	322	10.64
Los Altos Hills	Santa Clara	8,408	942.2	2	0.24	73	8.68
Los Angeles	Los Angeles	3,906,772	8,335.9	19,171	4.91	83,139	21.28
Los Banos	Merced	37,011	3,703.7	133	3.59	900	24.32
Los Gatos	Santa Clara	30,614	2,741.7	23	0.75	616	20.12
Lynwood	Los Angeles	71,812	14,837.2	401	5.58	1,424	19.83
McFarland	Kern	12,346	4,627.4	65	5.26	230	18.63
Madera	Madera	63,495	4,021.5	415	6.54	1,686	26.55
Malibu	Los Angeles	12,912	652.5	25	1.94	312	24.16
Mammoth Lakes	Mono	8,033	323.1	28	3.49	111	13.82
Manhattan Beach	Los Angeles	35,872	9,111.5	37	1.03	878	24.48
Manteca	San Joaquin	73,055	3,555.5	176	2.41	2,100	28.75
Marina	Monterey	20,530	2,311.2	58	2.83	463	22.55
Martinez	Contra Costa	37,416	2,962.2	73	1.95	974	26.03
Marysville	Yuba	12,242	3,534.1	86	7.02	507	41.41
Maywood	Los Angeles	27,833	23,627.3	88	3.16	250	8.98
Mendota	Fresno	11,480	3,483.0	72	6.27	287	25.0
Menifee	Riverside	84,843	1,825.7	107	1.26	1,501	17.69
Menlo Park	San Mateo	33,321	3,408.8	52	1.56	565	16.96
Merced	Merced	81,603	3,513.4	570	6.99	2,632	32.25
Mill Valley	Marin	14,411	3,025.6	11	0.76	188	13.05
Milpitas	Santa Clara	70,568	5,196.1	112	1.59	2,131	30.2
Mission Viejo	Orange	97,124	5,510.0	71	0.73	864	8.9
Modesto	Stanislaus	205,820	4,616.1	1,778	8.64	9,113	44.28
Monrovia	Los Angeles	37,225	2,736.1	47	1.26	718	19.29
Montague	Siskiyou	1,398	786.3	2	1.43	13	9.3
Montclair	San Bernardino	38,347	6,950.7	210	5.48	1,506	39.27
Montebello	Los Angeles	63,737	7,648.7	134	2.1	1,449	22.73
Monterey	Monterey	28,512	3,280.3	115	4.03	1,022	35.84
Monterey Park	Los Angeles	61,284	7,992.2	91	1.48	1,039	16.95
Monte Sereno	Santa Clara	3,511	2,147.4	0	0.0	30	8.54
Moorpark	Ventura	35,299	2,806.2	39	1.1	277	7.85
Moraga	Contra Costa	16,953	1,791.1	8	0.47	150	8.85
Moreno Valley	Riverside	202,911	3,957.3	584	2.88	6,410	31.59
Morgan Hill	Santa Clara	41,585	3,261.8	65	1.56	612	14.72
Morro Bay	San Luis Obispo	10,516	1,983.0	50	4.75	234	22.25
Mountain View	Santa Clara	78,759	6,567.1	156	1.98	1,608	20.42
Mount Shasta	Siskiyou	3,267	867.5	6	1.84	62	18.98
Murrieta	Riverside	108,376	3,227.3	68	0.63	1,458	13.45
Napa	Napa	79,572	4,456.6	249	3.13	1,315	16.53
National City	San Diego	60,130	8,260.8	267	4.44	1,589	26.43
Needles	San Bernardino	4,944	160.4	25	5.06	164	33.17
Nevada City	Nevada	3,055	1,396.3	36	11.78	95	31.1
Newark	Alameda	44,467	3,204.8	109	2.45	971	21.84
Newman	Stanislaus	10,742	5,333.7	25	2.33	157	14.62
Newport Beach	Orange	87,759	3,690.8	109	1.24	1,880	21.42
Norco	Riverside	26,933	1,954.9	46	1.71	642	23.84
Norwalk	Los Angeles	106,838	11,004.0	316	2.96	2,001	18.73
Novato	Marin	54,756	1,995.3	80	1.46	770	14.06
Oakdale	Stanislaus	21,651	3,581.6	43	1.99	822	37.97
Oakland	Alameda	409,994	7,335.3	6,910	16.85	24,367	59.43
Oakley	Contra Costa	38,851	2,447.6	45	1.16	469	12.07
Oceanside	San Diego	174,102	4,220.4	652	3.74	3,984	22.88
Ojai	Ventura	7,607	1,749.5	10	1.31	120	15.77
Ontario	San Bernardino	168,278	3,370.0	431	2.56	4,654	27.66
Orange	Orange	140,767	5,551.2	142	1.01	2,241	15.92
Orange Cove	Fresno	9,704	5,415.2	10	1.03	151	15.56
Orinda	Contra Costa	18,904	1,470.8	4	0.21	187	9.89
Orland	Glenn	7,511	2,577.6	20	2.66	123	16.38
Oroville	Butte	16,090	1,215.5	91	5.66	994	61.78
Oxnard	Ventura	204,159	7,589.3	884	4.33	6,382	31.26
Pacifica	San Mateo	38,925	3,074.2	91	2.34	638	16.39
Pacific Grove	Monterey	15,612	5,462.6	30	1.92	301	19.28
Palmdale	Los Angeles	158,210	1,493.0	840	5.31	3,219	20.35
Palm Desert	Riverside	50,971	1,901.3	140	2.75	2,178	42.73
Palm Springs	Riverside	46,665	496.2	295	6.32	2,722	58.33
Palo Alto	Santa Clara	67,169	2,813.6	59	0.88	1,299	19.34
Palos Verdes Estates	Los Angeles	13,668	2,863.0	5	0.37	121	8.85
Paradise	Butte	26,306	1,436.1	52	1.98	516	19.62
Paramount	Los Angeles	55,194	11,668.9	239	4.33	1,408	25.51
Parlier	Fresno	14,948	6,538.9	116	7.76	234	15.65
Pasadena	Los Angeles	140,373	6,107.7	394	2.81	3,469	24.71
Patterson	Stanislaus	20,977	3,523.2	40	1.91	626	29.84
Perris	Riverside	73,223	2,332.4	180	2.46	1,905	26.02
Petaluma	Sonoma	59,803	4,158.2	200	3.34	1,074	17.96
Pico Rivera	Los Angeles	63,970	7,710.9	275	4.3	1,360	21.26
Piedmont	Alameda	11,170	6,570.6	8	0.72	232	20.77
Pinole	Contra Costa	19,034	3,695.9	69	3.63	632	33.2
Pismo Beach	San Luis Obispo	7,910	2,197.8	26	3.29	387	48.93
Pittsburg	Contra Costa	67,509	3,927.7	175	2.59	2,362	34.99
Placentia	Orange	52,513	7,939.7	82	1.56	732	13.94
Placerville	El Dorado	10,486	1,804.2	57	5.44	273	26.03
Pleasant Hill	Contra Costa	34,363	4,856.3	60	1.75	1,738	50.58
Pleasanton	Alameda	75,060	3,072.8	61	0.81	1,244	16.57
Pomona	Los Angeles	151,899	6,618.1	777	5.12	4,403	28.99
Porterville	Tulare	55,391	3,145.8	158	2.85	1,204	21.74
Port Hueneme	Ventura	22,247	4,998.2	89	4.0	347	15.6
Poway	San Diego	49,786	1,274.0	70	1.41	436	8.76
Rancho Cordova	Sacramento	68,636	1,969.3	305	4.44	1,644	23.95
Rancho Cucamonga	San Bernardino	172,694	4,332.1	283	1.64	3,668	21.24
Rancho Mirage	Riverside	17,926	732.8	29	1.62	677	37.77
Rancho Palos Verdes	Los Angeles	42,645	3,167.1	24	0.56	472	11.07
Rancho Santa Margarita	Orange	49,558	3,842.6	27	0.54	203	4.1
Red Bluff	Tehama	14,103	1,864.7	129	9.15	911	64.6
Redding	Shasta	91,426	1,532.8	610	6.67	3,924	42.92
Redlands	San Bernardino	70,295	1,951.0	147	2.09	2,837	40.36
Redondo Beach	Los Angeles	68,075	10,983.4	158	2.32	1,447	21.26
Redwood City	San Mateo	81,870	4,208.8	194	2.37	1,728	21.11
Reedley	Fresno	25,186	4,902.9	199	7.9	460	18.26
Rialto	San Bernardino	102,540	4,589.4	328	3.2	2,154	21.01
Richmond	Contra Costa	108,464	3,609.2	843	7.77	4,281	39.47
Ridgecrest	Kern	28,830	1,388.3	118	4.09	470	16.3
Rio Dell	Humboldt	3,358	1,472.2	19	5.66	57	16.97
Rio Vista	Solano	7,825	1,179.2	38	4.86	116	14.82
Ripon	San Joaquin	14,859	2,800.9	18	1.21	258	17.36
Riverbank	Stanislaus	23,690	5,789.3	28	1.18	688	29.04
Riverside	Riverside	319,453	3,935.2	1,384	4.33	9,864	30.88
Rocklin	Placer	60,371	3,088.8	50	0.83	1,039	17.21
Rohnert Park	Sonoma	41,535	5,931.0	160	3.85	735	17.7
Rolling Hills	Los Angeles	1,896	633.9	1	0.53	18	9.49
Rolling Hills Estates	Los Angeles	8,233	2,306.8	7	0.85	114	13.85
Rosemead	Los Angeles	54,748	10,606.0	147	2.69	1,186	21.66
Roseville	Placer	128,997	3,055.9	193	1.5	3,070	23.8
Ross	Marin	2,476	1,591.3	4	1.62	21	8.48
Sacramento	Sacramento	482,767	4,930.0	2,968	6.15	15,078	31.23
St. Helena	Napa	5,978	1,198.7	6	1.0	56	9.37
Salinas	Monterey	156,908	6,645.8	997	6.35	5,227	33.31
San Bernardino	San Bernardino	214,588	3,488.8	2,128	9.92	9,239	43.05
San Bruno	San Mateo	42,787	7,835.0	110	2.57	1,054	24.63
San Buenaventura (Ventura)	Ventura	109,246	5,007.6	276	2.53	3,867	35.4
San Clemente	Orange	65,397	3,562.7	69	1.06	687	10.51
Sand City	Monterey	343	610.3	4	11.66	165	481.05
San Diego	San Diego	1,368,690	4,208.9	5,214	3.81	26,812	19.59
San Dimas	Los Angeles	33,953	2,258.0	69	2.03	631	18.58
San Fernando	Los Angeles	24,362	10,262.0	75	3.08	406	16.67
San Francisco	San Francisco	850,294	18,132.6	6,761	7.95	45,093	53.03
San Gabriel	Los Angeles	40,409	9,748.9	83	2.05	555	13.73
Sanger	Fresno	24,771	4,330.6	97	3.92	549	22.16
San Jacinto	Riverside	46,216	1,797.1	101	2.19	1,875	40.57
San Jose	Santa Clara	1,009,679	5,718.3	3,242	3.21	24,577	24.34
San Juan Capistrano	Orange	36,124	2,537.7	62	1.72	383	10.6
San Leandro	Alameda	88,690	6,644.9	369	4.16	3,757	42.36
San Luis Obispo	San Luis Obispo	46,672	3,554.6	240	5.14	1,439	30.83
San Marcos	San Diego	90,799	3,726.6	196	2.16	1,286	14.16
San Marino	Los Angeles	13,371	3,549.5	5	0.37	221	16.53
San Mateo	San Mateo	102,082	8,415.7	230	2.25	1,944	19.04
San Pablo	Contra Costa	29,831	11,342.6	241	8.08	1,162	38.95
San Rafael	Marin	59,292	3,578.9	193	3.26	1,664	28.06
San Ramon	Contra Costa	75,049	4,036.8	23	0.31	748	9.97
Santa Ana	Orange	336,462	12,394.5	1,260	3.74	5,784	17.19
Santa Barbara	Santa Barbara	90,889	4,663.4	302	3.32	2,389	26.28
Santa Clara	Santa Clara	121,114	6,579.1	162	1.34	3,268	26.98
Santa Clarita	Los Angeles	206,930	3,924.3	307	1.48	2,437	11.78
Santa Cruz	Santa Cruz	63,440	4,979.6	524	8.26	3,270	51.54
Santa Fe Springs	Los Angeles	17,254	1,944.8	74	4.29	1,124	65.14
Santa Maria	Santa Barbara	102,885	4,516.5	439	4.27	3,045	29.6
Santa Monica	Los Angeles	93,151	11,069.6	338	3.63	3,026	32.48
Santa Paula	Ventura	30,269	6,590.2	85	2.81	447	14.77
Santa Rosa	Sonoma	172,991	4,189.5	636	3.68	3,850	22.26
Santee	San Diego	56,737	3,495.8	130	2.29	794	13.99
Saratoga	Santa Clara	31,122	2,493.9	19	0.61	288	9.25
Sausalito	Marin	7,137	4,029.9	21	2.94	232	32.51
Scotts Valley	Santa Cruz	11,795	2,554.1	17	1.44	264	22.38
Seal Beach	Orange	24,727	2,188.8	26	1.05	494	19.98
Seaside	Monterey	34,350	3,717.5	116	3.38	507	14.76
Sebastopol	Sonoma	7,646	4,110.8	10	1.31	124	16.22
Selma	Fresno	24,404	4,749.7	154	6.31	986	40.4
Shafter	Kern	17,235	616.7	46	2.67	462	26.81
Sierra Madre	Los Angeles	11,090	3,755.5	13	1.17	92	8.3
Signal Hill	Los Angeles	11,411	5,244.0	40	3.51	500	43.82
Simi Valley	Ventura	126,604	3,052.5	140	1.11	1,618	12.78
Solana Beach	San Diego	13,321	3,784.4	22	1.65	188	14.11
Soledad	Monterey	25,807	5,846.6	53	2.05	232	8.99
Solvang	Santa Barbara	5,418	2,234.2	9	1.66	81	14.95
Sonoma	Sonoma	10,950	3,990.5	34	3.11	166	15.16
Sonora	Tuolumne	4,786	1,513.1	22	4.6	335	70.0
South El Monte	Los Angeles	20,465	7,198.4	120	5.86	647	31.61
South Gate	Los Angeles	95,981	13,264.4	506	5.27	2,687	28.0
South Lake Tahoe	El Dorado	21,379	2,104.6	112	5.24	516	24.14
South Pasadena	Los Angeles	26,041	7,647.9	30	1.15	475	18.24
South San Francisco	San Mateo	66,793	7,277.5	156	2.34	1,274	19.07
Stallion Springs	Kern	2,587	157.5	4	1.55	11	4.25
Stanton	Orange	38,791	12,525.3	124	3.2	684	17.63
Stockton	San Joaquin	299,519	4,857.0	3,988	13.31	13,148	43.9
Suisun City	Solano	28,986	7,061.1	68	2.35	606	20.91
Sunnyvale	Santa Clara	149,384	6,795.4	167	1.12	2,356	15.77
Susanville	Lassen	15,048	1,894.0	107	7.11	315	20.93
Sutter Creek	Amador	2,438	929.5	3	1.23	42	17.23
Taft	Kern	8,895	582.7	46	5.17	276	31.03
Tehachapi	Kern	12,997	1,316.2	51	3.92	309	23.77
Temecula	Riverside	108,308	2,910.6	100	0.92	2,535	23.41
Temple City	Los Angeles	36,272	9,054.4	45	1.24	428	11.8
Thousand Oaks	Ventura	129,175	2,340.8	128	0.99	1,599	12.38
Tiburon	Marin	9,232	2,076.5	1	0.11	107	11.59
Torrance	Los Angeles	147,971	7,225.9	155	1.05	2,623	17.73
Tracy	San Joaquin	85,078	3,770.9	129	1.52	2,262	26.59
Truckee	Nevada	16,161	500.0	18	1.11	164	10.15
Tulare	Tulare	61,596	3,023.1	457	7.42	2,054	33.35
Tulelake	Siskiyou	988	2,409.8	1	1.01	3	3.04
Turlock	Stanislaus	70,786	4,181.6	372	5.26	2,510	35.46
Tustin	Orange	79,046	7,103.3	132	1.67	1,356	17.15
Twentynine Palms	San Bernardino	25,936	438.5	62	2.39	301	11.61
Ukiah	Mendocino	15,836	3,391.0	134	8.46	551	34.79
Union City	Alameda	73,268	3,776.7	207	2.83	1,602	21.86
Upland	San Bernardino	75,790	4,853.0	170	2.24	2,165	28.57
Vacaville	Solano	94,701	3,336.5	268	2.83	2,587	27.32
Vallejo	Solano	119,504	3,896.3	1,034	8.65	4,877	40.81
Vernon	Los Angeles	115	23.1	25	217.39	312	2,713.04
Victorville	San Bernardino	122,316	1,668.0	642	5.25	4,374	35.76
Villa Park	Orange	5,982	2,877.3	5	0.84	84	14.04
Visalia	Tulare	128,488	3,448.6	484	3.77	3,796	29.54
Vista	San Diego	97,651	5,227.6	340	3.48	1,686	17.27
Walnut	Los Angeles	30,282	3,367.7	29	0.96	294	9.71
Walnut Creek	Contra Costa	67,555	3,418.9	74	1.1	2,439	36.1
Waterford	Stanislaus	8,646	3,713.9	18	2.08	196	22.67
Watsonville	Santa Cruz	52,778	7,891.4	265	5.02	1,489	28.21
Weed	Siskiyou	2,894	604.2	20	6.91	84	29.03
West Covina	Los Angeles	108,136	6,741.2	225	2.08	2,832	26.19
West Hollywood	Los Angeles	35,507	18,816.6	267	7.52	1,325	37.32
Westlake Village	Los Angeles	8,452	1,630.1	7	0.83	173	20.47
Westminster	Orange	92,217	9,182.2	194	2.1	2,210	23.97
Westmorland	Imperial	2,264	3,837.3	8	3.53	4	1.77
West Sacramento	Yolo	50,152	2,333.1	262	5.22	1,295	25.82
Wheatland	Yuba	3,521	2,160.1	4	1.14	50	14.2
Whittier	Los Angeles	86,952	5,935.7	239	2.75	2,247	25.84
Wildomar	Riverside	33,921	1,432.0	39	1.15	550	16.21
Williams	Colusa	5,188	953.0	6	1.16	64	12.34
Willits	Mendocino	4,814	1,720.5	33	6.86	50	10.39
Willows	Glenn	6,089	2,138.7	22	3.61	167	27.43
Windsor	Sonoma	27,350	3,763.1	86	3.14	254	9.29
Winters	Yolo	6,962	2,372.1	21	3.02	155	22.26
Woodlake	Tulare	7,700	3,334.8	30	3.9	122	15.84
Woodland	Yolo	56,854	3,714.5	298	5.24	1,756	30.89
Yorba Linda	Orange	67,702	3,505.3	45	0.66	702	10.37
Yountville	Napa	2,978	1,945.1	7	2.35	40	13.43
Yreka	Siskiyou	7,558	756.9	62	8.2	298	39.43
Yuba City	Sutter	65,525	4,473.0	223	3.4	1,699	25.93
Yucaipa	San Bernardino	52,794	1,858.9	71	1.34	978	18.52
Yucca Valley	San Bernardino	21,228	530.5	75	3.53	533	25.11

== See also ==
- Crime in California
- California locations by income
- California locations by race
- California locations by voter registration
- Organized crime in California
- Crime in the United States
