= Politics of California =

United States presidential election results for California
Year	Republican / Whig		Democratic		Third party(ies)	
Year	No.	%	No.	%	No.	%
1852	35,972	46.83%	40,721	53.02%	117	0.15%
1856	20,704	18.78%	53,342	48.38%	36,209	32.84%
1860	38,733	32.32%	37,999	31.71%	43,095	35.96%
1864	62,053	58.60%	43,837	41.40%	0	0.00%
1868	54,588	50.24%	54,068	49.76%	0	0.00%
1872	54,007	56.38%	40,717	42.51%	1,061	1.11%
1876	79,258	50.88%	76,460	49.08%	66	0.04%
1880	80,282	48.89%	80,426	48.98%	3,510	2.14%
1884	102,369	51.97%	89,288	45.33%	5,331	2.71%
1888	124,816	49.66%	117,729	46.84%	8,794	3.50%
1892	118,027	43.78%	118,174	43.83%	33,408	12.39%
1896	146,688	49.16%	144,766	48.51%	6,965	2.33%
1900	164,755	54.37%	124,985	41.25%	13,264	4.38%
1904	205,226	61.84%	89,404	26.94%	37,248	11.22%
1908	214,398	55.46%	127,492	32.98%	44,707	11.56%
1912	3,914	0.58%	283,436	41.81%	390,594	57.61%
1916	462,516	46.27%	466,289	46.65%	70,798	7.08%
1920	624,992	66.20%	229,191	24.28%	89,867	9.52%
1924	733,250	57.20%	105,514	8.23%	443,136	34.57%
1928	1,162,323	64.69%	614,365	34.19%	19,968	1.11%
1932	847,902	37.39%	1,324,157	58.39%	95,907	4.23%
1936	836,431	31.70%	1,766,836	66.95%	35,615	1.35%
1940	1,351,419	41.34%	1,877,618	57.44%	39,754	1.22%
1944	1,512,965	42.97%	1,988,564	56.48%	19,346	0.55%
1948	1,895,269	47.13%	1,913,134	47.57%	213,135	5.30%
1952	2,897,310	56.35%	2,197,548	42.74%	46,991	0.91%
1956	3,027,668	55.39%	2,420,135	44.27%	18,552	0.34%
1960	3,259,722	50.10%	3,224,099	49.55%	22,757	0.35%
1964	2,879,108	40.79%	4,171,877	59.11%	6,601	0.09%
1968	3,467,664	47.82%	3,244,318	44.74%	539,605	7.44%
1972	4,602,096	55.00%	3,475,847	41.54%	289,919	3.46%
1976	3,882,244	49.35%	3,742,284	47.57%	242,589	3.08%
1980	4,524,858	52.69%	3,083,661	35.91%	978,544	11.40%
1984	5,467,009	57.51%	3,922,519	41.27%	115,895	1.22%
1988	5,054,917	51.13%	4,702,233	47.56%	129,914	1.31%
1992	3,630,574	32.61%	5,121,325	46.01%	2,379,822	21.38%
1996	3,828,380	38.21%	5,119,835	51.10%	1,071,269	10.69%
2000	4,567,429	41.65%	5,861,203	53.45%	537,224	4.90%
2004	5,509,826	44.36%	6,745,485	54.31%	166,042	1.34%
2008	5,011,781	36.95%	8,274,473	61.01%	275,646	2.03%
2012	4,839,958	37.12%	7,854,285	60.24%	344,304	2.64%
2016	4,483,810	31.62%	8,753,788	61.73%	943,997	6.66%
2020	6,006,429	34.32%	11,110,250	63.48%	384,202	2.20%
2024	6,081,697	38.33%	9,276,179	58.47%	507,599	3.20%

The politics of the U.S. state of California form part of the politics of the United States. The politics are defined by the Constitution of California.

== Government ==
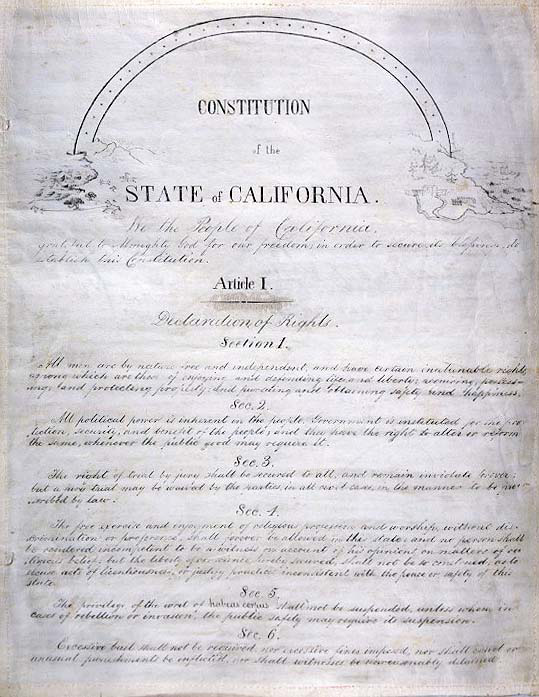
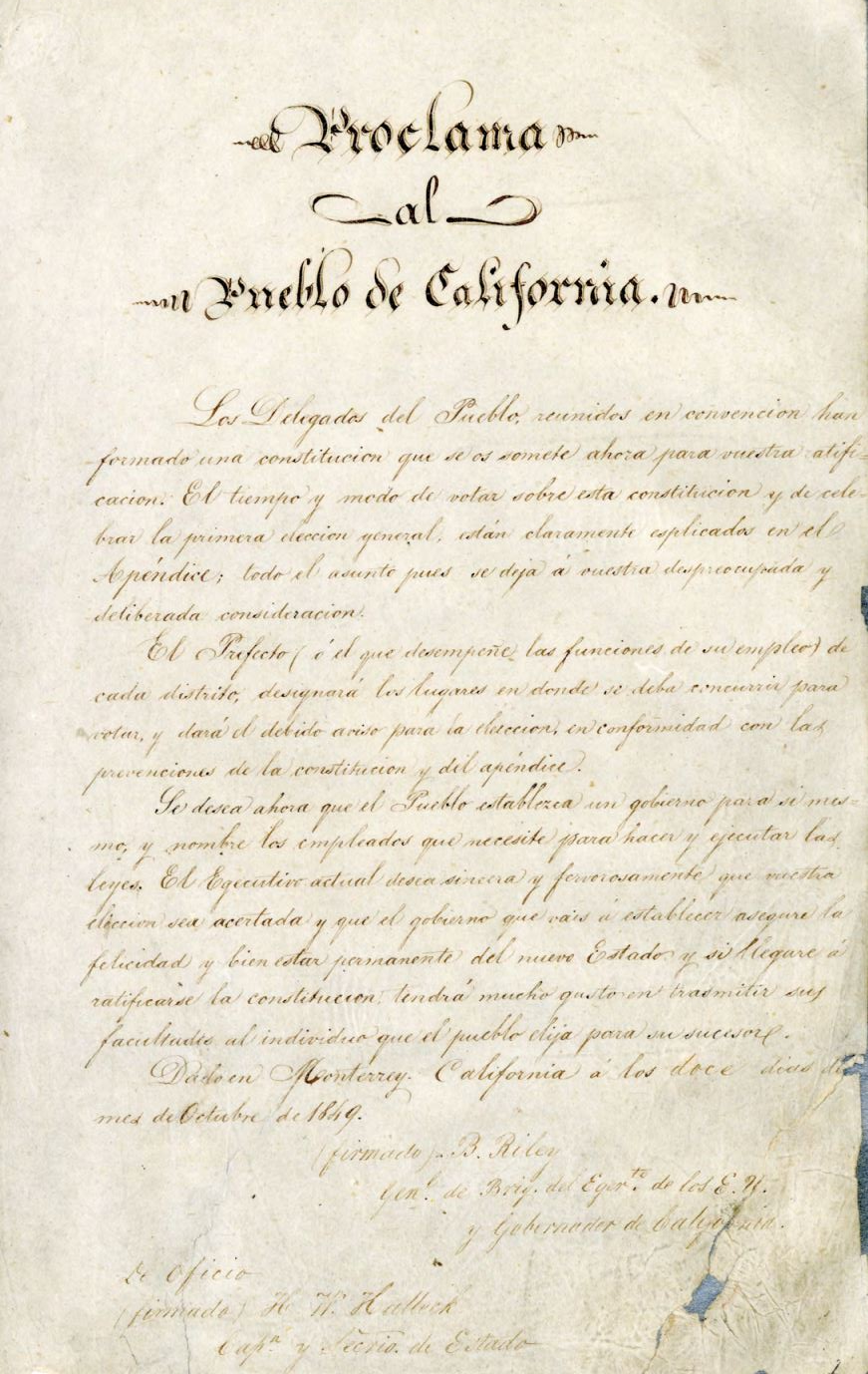
Title pages of the original English (left) and Spanish (right) versions of the 1849 Constitution of California.

California's government consists of three branches: the executive, legislative, and judicial branches. The California State Legislature is bicameral. The lower house, the California State Assembly, has 80 members, and the upper house, the California State Senate, has 40 members. The executive branch is led by the Governor of California. The judicial branch consists of the Supreme Court of California, the California Courts of Appeal, and the California superior courts.

== Electoral system ==
California currently uses the nonpartisan blanket primary in its elections, where candidates regardless of party, including multiple nominees from a single party, contest the ballot and the candidates with the two highest numbers of votes are entered into a general election. Some municipalities, such as San Francisco and Berkeley, have opted to use instant-runoff voting for local elections.

== Political parties ==
As of 2023, the two major political parties in California that currently have representation in the State Legislature and U.S. Congress are the Democratic Party and the Republican Party. There are four other parties that qualify for official ballot status: the American Independent Party, Green Party, Libertarian Party, and Peace and Freedom Party. There are also other minor parties in California that are not ballot qualified including the American Solidarity Party and the Forward Party.

California voter registration statistics as of September 5, 2025
Party	Registered voters	Percentage
Democratic	10,367,511	44.96
Republican	5,824,460	25.26
No party preference	5,199,706	22.55
American Independent	934,308	4.05
Libertarian	233,539	1.01
Others	147,933	0.64
Peace and Freedom	147,394	0.64
Green	113,050	0.49
Unknown	93,362	0.40
Total Registered Voters	23,061,263	84.78
Total Eligible Voters	27,202,134	100.00

== History ==
The first presidential election the state participated in was 1852. For the next few decades after the Civil War, California was a Republican-leaning but a very competitive state in presidential elections, as it voted for the nationwide winner all but thrice between statehood and 1912, with the exceptions of 1880, 1884, and 1912. Beginning with the 1916 election, the state shifted into a bellwether. Between 1916 and 1948, it voted for the nationwide winner every time, and was critical to Democratic victories in 1916 and 1948, as well.

Franklin Roosevelt carried all but one county in the state in 1932, and in 1936 all counties. Roosevelt's third and fourth presidential elections saw him win by smaller margins. In 1948, the state narrowly voted for Truman. Beginning with the 1952 presidential election, California became a Republican-leaning battleground state. The Republican candidate won California in every presidential election in the next 36 years except the election of 1964, often by a margin similar to the national one. In these years, the GOP nominated two Californians as presidential candidates during five presidential elections: Richard Nixon in 1960, 1968 and 1972, and Ronald Reagan in 1980 and 1984.

Beginning with the 1992 presidential election, California has become increasingly Democratic. The state has voted Democratic in every presidential election since then, usually by lopsided margins, and starting in 2008 to 2020, Democrats have consistently gotten over 60% of the vote. Voting patterns since 1992 have remained consistent by and large, with Democratic presidential candidates carrying the coastal counties and Republicans the inland counties, though Democrats have gained in many Southern counties as well.

At the state level, California has had more mixed voting tendencies until more recently. Six of the state's first seven governors were Democrats; during subsequent decades, control of the governorship frequently shifted between the two parties. In the 20th century, 13 of the state's 20 governors were Republicans, but Democrats have held the governorship since 2011. The 2018 election marked the first time Democrats won more than two consecutive gubernatorial elections in the state's history.

Northern California's inland areas and the Central Valley are mostly Republican areas. Historically, parts of Southern California, such as Orange County and Riverside County were Republican bastions, however, they have continued to trend Democratic in recent decades, with all five congressional districts flipping Democrat in 2018. Coastal California, including the Bay Area, Los Angeles, San Diego and Sacramento, is mostly Democratic-leaning. In the 2016 and 2020 presidential elections, Democrats won all of California's coastal counties except for Del Norte. As most of the population is in Southern California and the San Francisco Bay Area, California as a whole tends to be liberal.

In 2024, The New York Times wrote that California was undergoing a "wave of corruption", as multiple local politicians had been embroiled on corruption scandals where they accepted bribes and favors from political connected businesses and organizations. In a decade, 576 public officials in California were convicted on federal corruption charges.

== Political issues ==
Many of California's governmental agencies, institutions, and programs have been established in the Constitution of California. Additionally, the state constitution establishes mandatory funding levels for some agencies, programs and institutions. This issue came to the forefront when Governor Arnold Schwarzenegger and the California Legislature attempted to cut spending to close the state's multibillion-dollar budget deficits during the 2000s. Consequently, affected agencies with support from special interest groups, successfully pressed the California Supreme Court to order the restoration of funding to a number of agencies and programs which had been cut.

There have been several events, many dubbed "constitutional crises" by their opponents, over the last thirty-two years including:

- the passage of term limits for the California legislature and elected constitutional officers, which was hotly argued statewide, and debated in the Supreme Court of California;
- a test of the ratification process for the Supreme Court, in which a liberal chief justice, Rose Bird, and two liberal associate Justices, Joseph Grodin and Cruz Reynoso, were ousted;
- a full-fledged tax revolt, "Proposition 13", which resulted in the freezing of real estate tax rates at 1% of the property's last sale price (plus a modest 2% maximum annual inflator);
- a test of the state recall provision, in which Governor Gray Davis was recalled in a 2003 special election.
- a failure to pass a budget until almost three months after the constitutional deadline (2008).

Water and water rights have been notable issues due to California's limited water supply. Various parts of the state have vied for water rights. In the California Water Wars, the city of Los Angeles conflicted with farmers from Eastern California over water rights. Most water is in the north of the State, while agriculture, the largest user of stored water in California, is most prevalent in the central and southern areas. There have been various proposals to transport additional water to the south, such as the Peripheral Canal, but these proposals have failed.

Land use is also divisive, with the California housing shortage being a significant issue.

Gun control is another divisive issue, with California having some of the most restrictive gun laws in the United States.

== Federal representation ==
Since it is the most populous state, California has the largest congressional delegation of any state, with 52 representatives and two senators. In the 199th Congress, 43 of California's seats are held by Democrats and 9 are held by Republicans:

- California's 1st congressional district represented by Doug LaMalfa (R)
- California's 2nd congressional district represented by Jared Huffman (D)
- California's 3rd congressional district represented by Kevin Kiley (R)
- California's 4th congressional district represented by Mike Thompson (D)
- California's 5th congressional district represented by Tom McClintock (R)
- California's 6th congressional district represented by Ami Bera (D)
- California's 7th congressional district represented by Doris Matsui (D)
- California's 8th congressional district represented by John Garamendi (D)
- California's 9th congressional district represented by Josh Harder (D)
- California's 10th congressional district represented by Mark DeSaulnier (D)
- California's 11th congressional district represented by Nancy Pelosi (D)
- California's 12th congressional district represented by Lateefah Simon (D)
- California's 13th congressional district represented by Adam Gray (D)
- California's 14th congressional district is currently vacant.
- California's 15th congressional district represented by Kevin Mullin (D)
- California's 16th congressional district represented by Sam Liccardo (D)
- California's 17th congressional district represented by Ro Khanna (D)
- California's 18th congressional district represented by Zoe Lofgren (D)
- California's 19th congressional district represented by Jimmy Panetta (D)
- California's 20th congressional district represented by Kevin McCarthy (R)
- California's 21st congressional district represented by Jim Costa (D)
- California's 22nd congressional district represented by David Valadao (R)
- California's 23rd congressional district represented by Jay Obernolte (R)
- California's 24th congressional district represented by Salud Carbajal (D)
- California's 25th congressional district represented by Raul Ruiz (D)
- California's 26th congressional district represented by Julia Brownley (D)
- California's 27th congressional district represented by George Whitesides (D)
- California's 28th congressional district represented by Judy Chu (D)
- California's 29th congressional district represented by Luz Rivas (D)
- California's 30th congressional district represented by Laura Friedman (D)
- California's 31st congressional district represented by Gil Cisneros (D)
- California's 32nd congressional district represented by Brad Sherman (D)
- California's 33rd congressional district represented by Pete Aguilar (D)
- California's 34th congressional district represented by Jimmy Gomez (D)
- California's 35th congressional district represented by Norma Torres (D)
- California's 36th congressional district represented by Ted Lieu (D)
- California's 37th congressional district represented by Sydney Kamlager-Dove (D)
- California's 38th congressional district represented by Linda Sánchez (D)
- California's 39th congressional district represented by Mark Takano (D)
- California's 40th congressional district represented by Young Kim (R)
- California's 41st congressional district represented by Ken Calvert (R)
- California's 42nd congressional district represented by Robert Garcia (D)
- California's 43rd congressional district represented by Maxine Waters (D)
- California's 44th congressional district represented by Nanette Barragán (D)
- California's 45th congressional district represented by Derek Tran (D)
- California's 46th congressional district represented by Lou Correa (D)
- California's 47th congressional district represented by Dave Min (D)
- California's 48th congressional district represented by Darrell Issa (R)
- California's 49th congressional district represented by Mike Levin (D)
- California's 50th congressional district represented by Scott Peters (D)
- California's 51st congressional district represented by Sara Jacobs (D)
- California's 52nd congressional district represented by Juan Vargas (D)

California is currently represented in the U.S. Senate by Democrats Alex Padilla, serving since 2021, and Adam Schiff, serving since 2024.

California is part of the United States District Court for the Northern District of California, the United States District Court for the Central District of California, the United States District Court for the Southern District of California, and the United States District Court for the Eastern District of California in the federal judiciary. The district's cases are appealed to the San Francisco-based United States Court of Appeals for the Ninth Circuit.

== Notable California political figures ==
- Hiram Johnson, 23rd governor of California (1911–1917), U.S. senator from California (1917–1945)
- Earl Warren, 30th governor of California (1943–1953), 14th chief justice of the United States (1953–1969)
- Richard Nixon, U.S. senator from California (1950–1953), 36th vice president of the United States (1953–1961), 37th president of the United States (1969–1974)
- Ronald Reagan, 33rd governor of California (1967–1975), 40th president of the United States (1981–1989)
- Jerry Brown, 34th and 39th governor of California (1975–1983 & 2011–2019)
- Arnold Schwarzenegger, 38th governor of California (2003–2011)
- Kamala Harris, U.S. senator from California (2017–2021), 49th vice president of the United States (2021–2025)
- Gavin Newsom, 40th governor of California (2019–present)
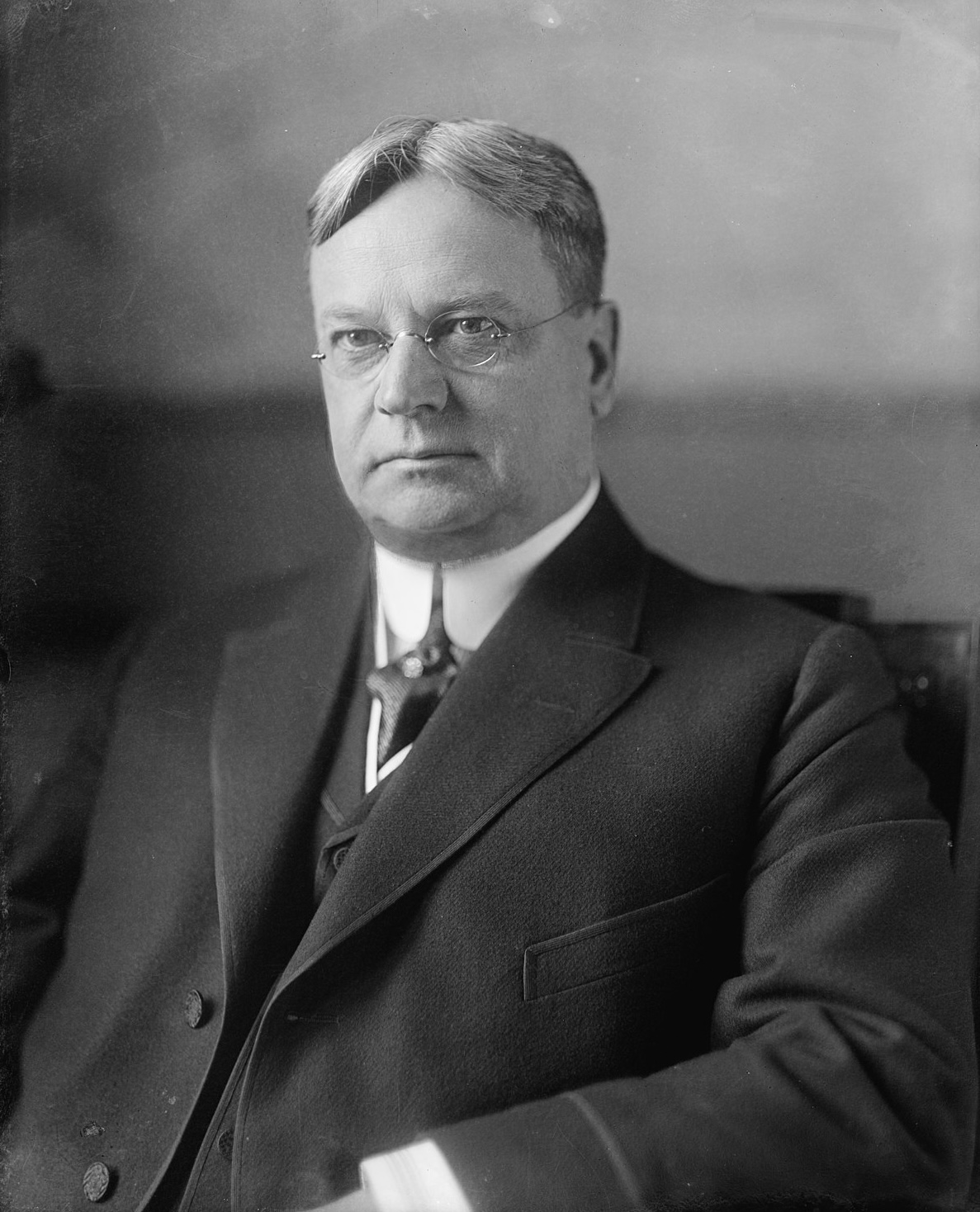
Hiram Johnson

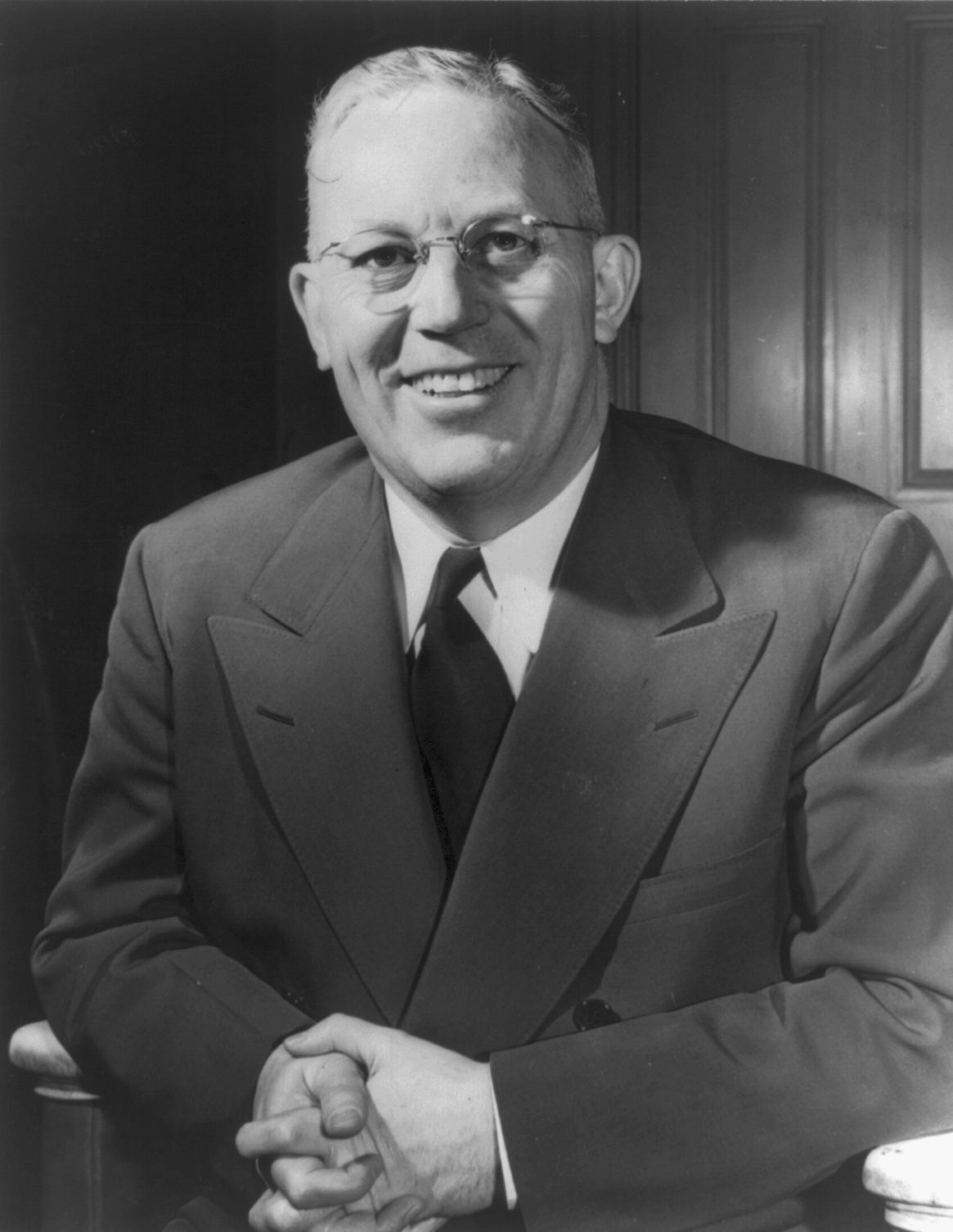
Earl Warren

Richard Nixon

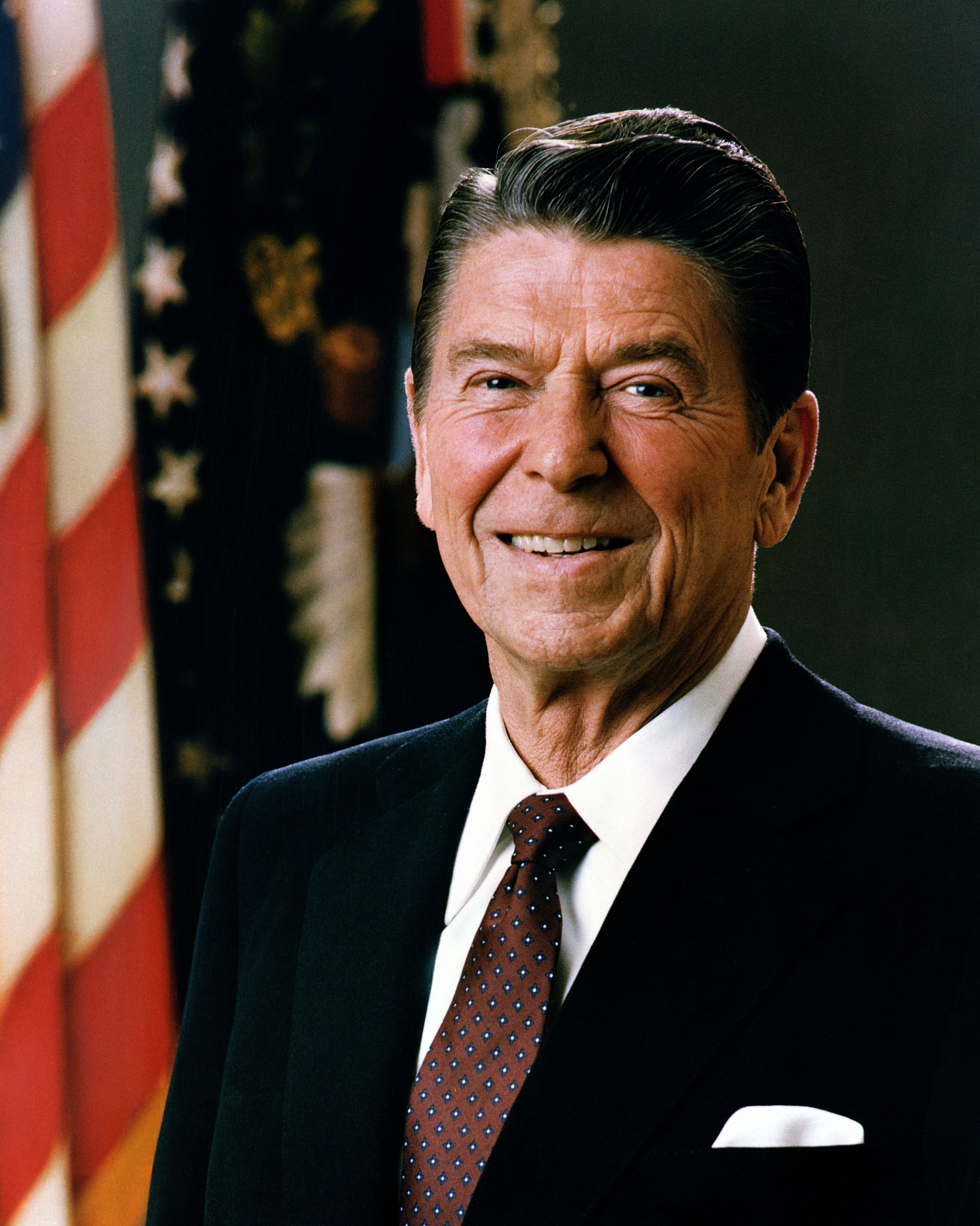
Ronald Reagan

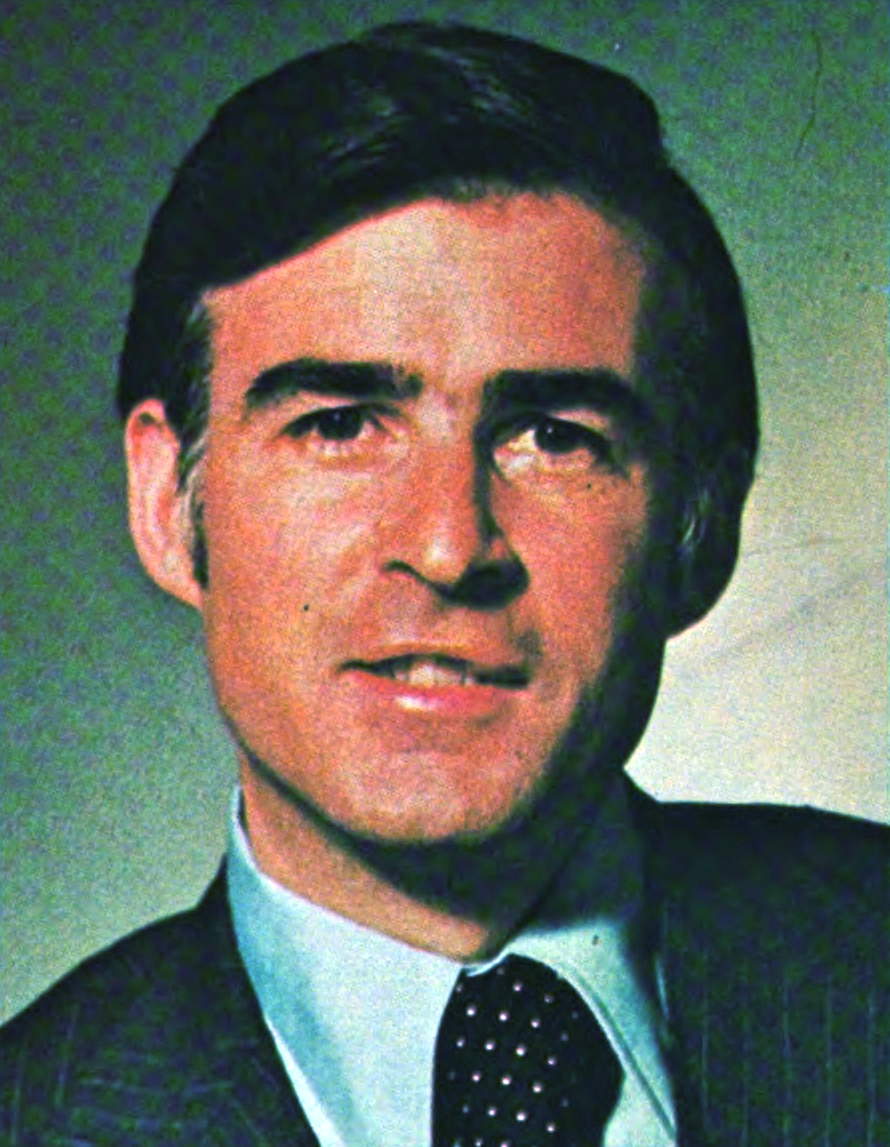
Jerry Brown

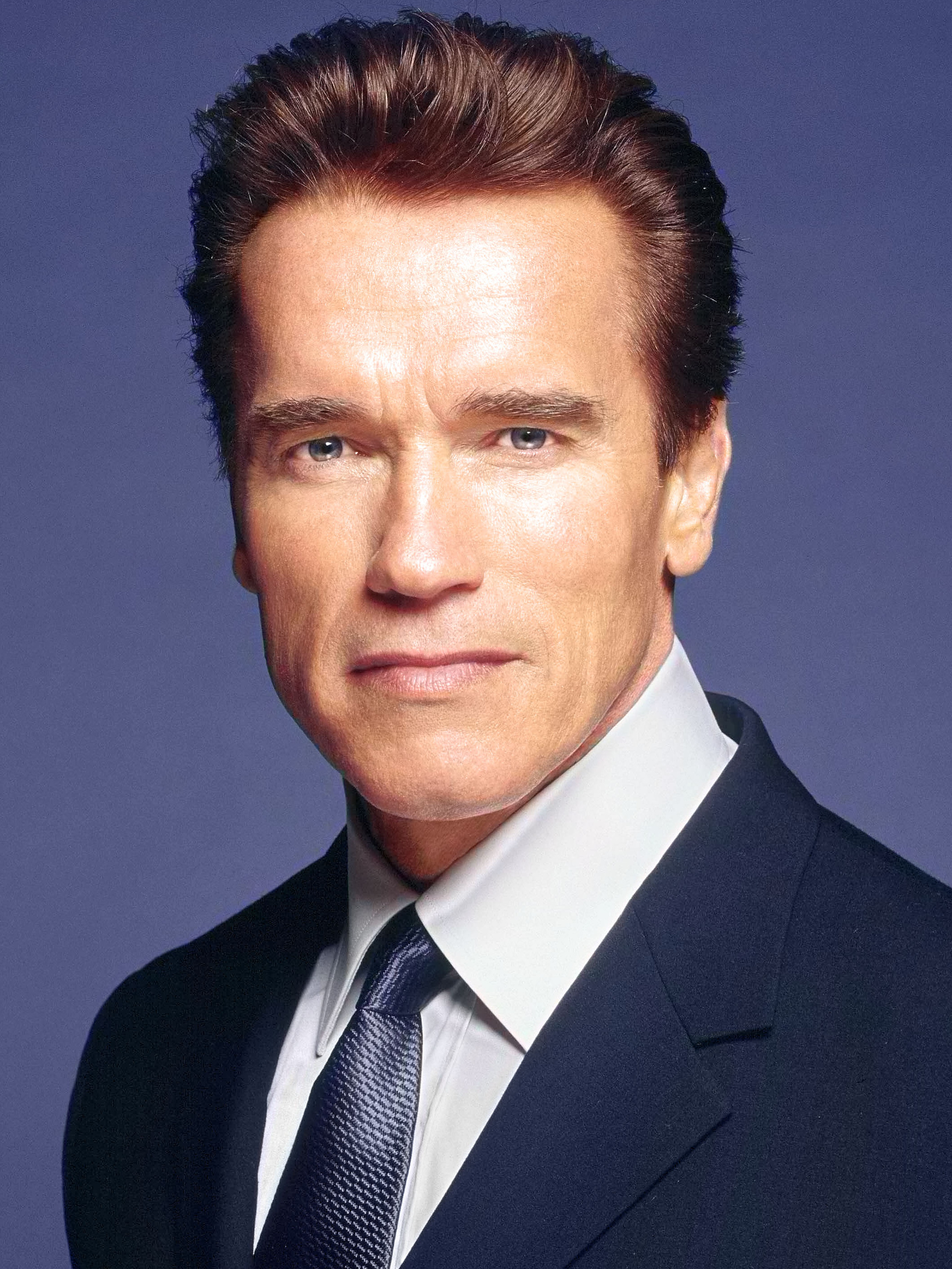
Arnold Schwarzenegger

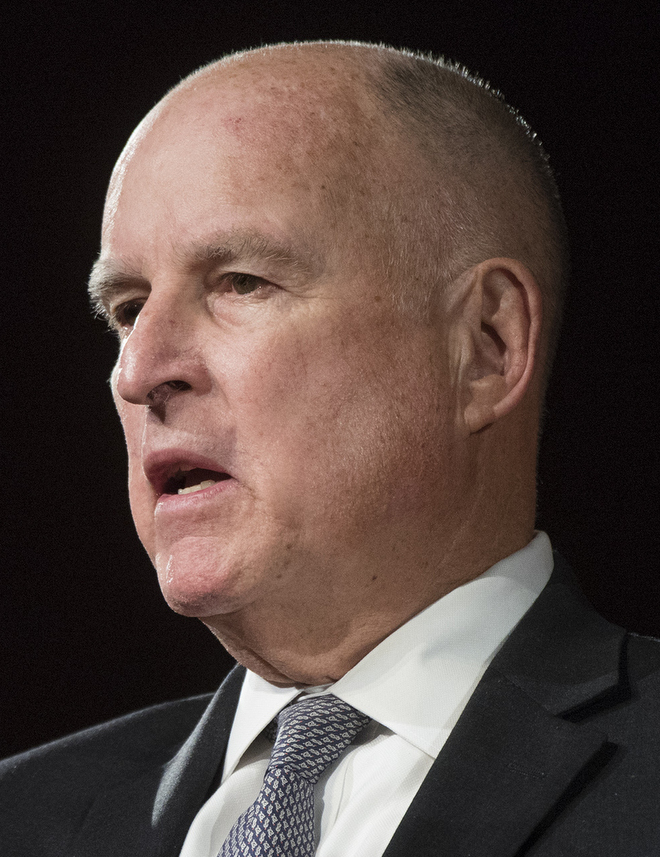
Jerry Brown

Kamala Harris

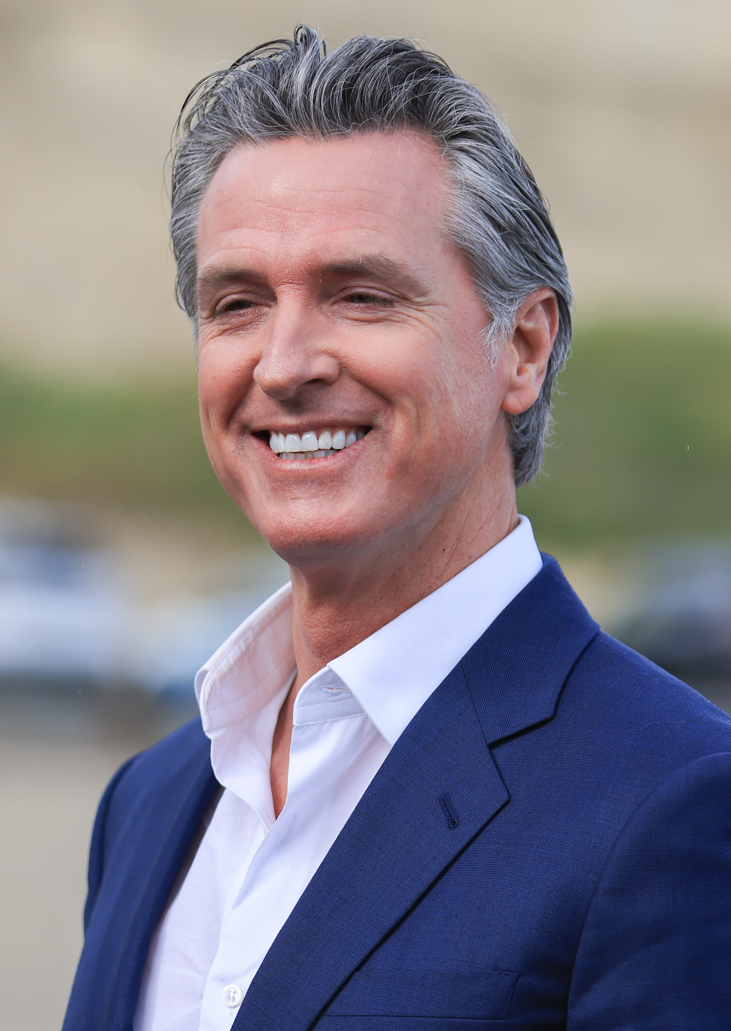
Gavin Newsom

== See also ==
- Politics of California before 1900
- Government of California
- California locations by voter registration
- Political party strength in California
- Electoral reform in California
- League of California Cities, a lobbying group representing most of the city governments
- Student Senate for California Community Colleges, a lobbying organization, authorized by state statute
- Big Five (California politics)
