= California locations by voter registration =

The following is a list of California locations by voter registration.

In July 2025, California had 22,900,896 registered voters, comprising 85.04% of its total eligible voters. Of those registered voters, 10,367,321 (45.27 percent) were registered Democrats, 5,776,356 (25.22 percent) were Republicans and, 5,116,983 were No Party Preference (22.34 percent).

The county with the highest percentage of registered Republicans was Modoc County, with registered Republicans comprising half of the registered voters. The ten counties with the highest percentage of registered Republicans are relatively small, with an average population of 91,776.

Similarly, the counties with the ten lowest percentages of registered voters are all relatively small, with the exception of Monterey County. Kings County had the lowest percentage of registered voters, with just 34.7 percent of its population registered to vote. The two smallest counties in California by population also had the highest percentage of registered voters; Sierra County had the highest percentage, with 73.1 percent of its population registered to vote.

Inglewood had the highest percentage of registered Democrats of any place in California. The ten places with the highest percentage of registered Democrats all had high percentages of minorities (see California locations by race) and relatively low levels of income. On the other hand, Marin County, the highest income county in California by per capita income, had many more registered Democrats than Republicans. Further, of the ten highest-income counties in California by per capita income, all but Placer County, Orange County and El Dorado County had more registered Democrats than Republicans. But in yet another reversal, the place with the highest percentage of registered Republicans was Villa Park, which also has very high levels of income. Of the ten places in California with the highest percentage of registered Republicans, most have incomes above the state average (see California locations by income).

== Entire state ==
Total population	39.43 Million	
Registered voters (Note: Percentage of registered voters with respect to total population. Percentages of party members with respect to registered voters follow.)	22,900,896	58.1%
Democratic	10,367,321	45.27%
Republican	5,776,356	25.22%
Democratic–Republican spread	+4,590,965	+20.05%
Other	1,258,955	7.17%
No party preference	5,116,983	22.34%

== Counties ==
County	Population	Registered voters	Democratic	Republican	D–R spread	Other	No party preference
Alameda	1,666,753	53.0%	55.4%	10.81%	+44.6%	4.15%	29.6%
Alpine	1,101	70.2%	41.3%	25.9%	+15.4%	5.8%	27.0%
Amador	39,383	69.0%	28.3%	43.7%	-15.4%	6.6%	21.3%
Butte	231,256	52.9%	34.4%	33.7%	+0.6%	7.0%	24.8%
Calaveras	45,602	64.6%	26.9%	41.4%	-14.5%	8.2%	23.6%
Colusa	21,627	40.8%	30.7%	39.4%	-10.9%	4.2%	25.7%
Contra Costa	1,150,215	54.8%	48.5%	19.4%	+29.1%	4.5%	27.7%
Del Norte	27,828	49.4%	30.3%	35.7%	-5.4%	7.6%	26.4%
El Dorado	190,678	63.9%	28.5%	39.7%	-11.3%	7.1%	24.6%
Fresno	994,400	46.3%	37.5%	32.6%	+4.8%	5.1%	24.8%
Glenn	28,047	45.7%	27.7%	41.9%	-14.2%	5.5%	24.9%
Humboldt	136,373	57.3%	43.6%	22.6%	+20.9%	7.6%	26.2%
Imperial	181,827	38.4%	47.1%	18.2%	+28.9%	4.6%	30.0%
Inyo	17,987	56.5%	30.1%	39.0%	-8.9%	6.4%	24.4%
Kern	896,764	42.3%	33.1%	34.9%	-1.7%	5.5%	26.5%
Kings	151,366	34.7%	32.3%	39.9%	-7.6%	4.7%	23.0%
Lake	64,382	51.0%	37.3%	26.4%	+10.9%	6.7%	29.5%
Lassen	30,802	46.9%	19.5%	48.6%	-29.2%	7.7%	24.2%
Los Angeles	10,105,518	53.4%	49.7%	16.7%	+33.0%	4.8%	28.8%
Madera	157,672	36.8%	31.2%	37.9%	-6.6%	5.4%	25.4%
Marin	259,666	62.3%	55.3%	14.4%	+40.9%	4.7%	25.9%
Mariposa	17,471	62.3%	27.6%	42.5%	-14.8%	7.4%	22.5%
Mendocino	87,606	56.8%	46.7%	19.5%	+27.2%	8.0%	25.6%
Merced	274,765	35.8%	42.4%	27.1%	+15.4%	4.5%	26.0%
Modoc	8,777	56.3%	21.2%	49.0%	-27.9%	6.9%	22.9%
Mono	14,250	47.0%	34.1%	30.2%	+3.9%	6.2%	29.4%
Monterey	435,594	43.5%	48.7%	20.2%	+28.6%	4.4%	26.6%
Napa	139,417	56.0%	45.3%	21.7%	+23.6%	5.6%	27.4%
Nevada	99,696	68.7%	36.0%	32.5%	+3.5%	13.8%	11.4%
Orange	3,185,968	49.9%	33.3%	34.0%	-0.7%	4.2%	28.5%
Placer	393,149	60.5%	27.9%	41.0%	-13.1%	6.1%	25.0%
Plumas	18,804	65.8%	27.7%	41.9%	-14.2%	7.0%	23.4%
Riverside	2,450,758	43.2%	36.8%	32.1%	+4.7%	5.4%	25.7%
Sacramento	1,540,975	50.6%	42.0%	25.2%	+16.8%	5.7%	27.1%
San Benito	61,537	50.4%	44.6%	25.4%	+19.2%	4.3%	25.7%
San Bernardino	2,171,603	44.3%	38.8%	28.8%	+10.0%	6.0%	26.4%
San Diego	3,343,364	52.2%	35.7%	27.1%	+8.6%	5.6%	31.6%
San Francisco	883,305	55.8%	56.8%	6.4%	+50.4%	3.9%	32.9%
San Joaquin	752,660	46.4%	41.0%	28.4%	+12.6%	4.9%	25.7%
San Luis Obispo	284,010	60.0%	34.3%	34.4%	-0.1%	6.2%	25.1%
San Mateo	769,545	52.6%	50.0%	14.8%	+35.2%	3.9%	31.3%
Santa Barbara	446,527	48.9%	41.9%	25.3%	+16.6%	5.2%	27.6%
Santa Clara	1,937,570	46.2%	45.2%	16.9%	+28.3%	3.4%	34.5%
Santa Cruz	274,255	58.7%	54.2%	13.7%	+40.5%	8.8%	27.0%
Shasta	180,040	56.2%	22.8%	45.8%	-23.0%	6.1%	25.3%
Sierra	2,987	73.1%	27.3%	39.9%	-12.6%	9.8%	23.0%
Siskiyou	43,724	63.0%	29.6%	38.0%	-8.4%	7.7%	24.7%
Solano	446,610	52.8%	45.1%	21.2%	+23.9%	5.5%	28.2%
Sonoma	499,942	55.5%	51.5%	17.8%	+33.7%	5.4%	25.3%
Stanislaus	549,815	45.7%	36.8%	34.3%	+2.5%	5.8%	23.1%
Sutter	96,807	48.3%	29.3%	38.7%	-9.4%	6.6%	25.4%
Tehama	63,916	52.1%	24.8%	42.4%	-18.1%	7.4%	25.9%
Trinity	12,535	60.0%	31.3%	32.0%	-0.7%	17.6%	19.1%
Tulare	465,861	36.5%	31.0%	38.4%	-7.4%	5.1%	25.5%
Tuolumne	54,539	58.9%	28.6%	40.8%	-12.2%	6.0%	24.6%
Ventura	850,967	53.5%	39.4%	29.0%	+10.4%	6.1%	25.5%
Yolo	220,408	51.1%	47.0%	19.3%	+27.7%	5.6%	28.1%
Yuba	78,041	43.4%	26.7%	35.8%	-9.1%	8.0%	29.5%

== Cities ==
City	County	Population	Registered voters	Democratic	Republican	D–R spread	Other	No party preference
Alameda	Alameda	73,239	61.3%	55.1%	14.5%	+40.6%	11.9%	20.7%
Albany	Alameda	18,217	59.1%	64.0%	6.5%	+57.5%	11.8%	18.9%
Berkeley	Alameda	111,008	72.9%	64.7%	4.4%	+60.3%	15.3%	17.0%
Dublin	Alameda	44,171	52.7%	42.7%	24.6%	+18.1%	14.3%	21.3%
Emeryville	Alameda	9,698	64.7%	59.6%	7.6%	+52.0%	15.3%	19.5%
Fremont	Alameda	211,748	47.9%	46.4%	17.5%	+28.9%	12.2%	26.0%
Hayward	Alameda	14,236	43.7%	60.1%	12.7%	+47.4%	11.0%	18.4%
Livermore	Alameda	79,710	61.5%	39.4%	33.1%	+6.3%	12.4%	18.2%
Newark	Alameda	42,322	48.6%	53.9%	16.6%	+37.3%	10.7%	21.1%
Oakland	Alameda	389,397	55.4%	66.7%	5.9%	+60.8%	12.1%	16.9%
Piedmont	Alameda	10,640	79.7%	56.0%	19.6%	+36.4%	8.4%	17.9%
Pleasanton	Alameda	69,220	61.5%	38.2%	31.8%	+6.4%	12.0%	20.5%
San Leandro	Alameda	83,877	50.9%	58.7%	13.7%	+45.0%	10.2%	19.5%
Union City	Alameda	68,830	48.6%	54.9%	13.1%	+41.8%	10.5%	23.3%
Amador	Amador	158	83.5%	34.1%	41.7%	-7.6%	9.8%	18.2%
Ione	Amador	7,873	29.0%	27.3%	49.4%	-22.1%	11.4%	16.8%
Jackson	Amador	4,626	55.7%	32.3%	42.6%	-10.3%	11.2%	18.4%
Plymouth	Amador	1,055	49.4%	30.9%	38.8%	-7.9%	13.2%	22.5%
Sutter Creek	Amador	2,497	68.4%	35.9%	41.9%	-6.0%	9.6%	16.7%
Biggs	Butte	1,927	38.7%	36.7%	37.9%	-1.2%	8.8%	19.8%
Chico	Butte	85,605	55.0%	40.1%	30.3%	+9.8%	9.8%	22.7%
Gridley	Butte	6,509	40.6%	37.6%	34.8%	+2.8%	9.7%	21.3%
Oroville	Butte	15,445	40.8%	32.1%	36.2%	-4.1%	11.7%	24.2%
Paradise	Butte	26,348	62.1%	31.1%	40.8%	-9.7%	11.5%	20.5%
Angels	Calaveras	3,820	61.9%	31.5%	42.9%	-11.4%	11.2%	18.1%
Colusa	Colusa	5,951	37.8%	35.5%	44.6%	-9.1%	5.6%	16.8%
Williams	Colusa	5,003	22.7%	43.5%	31.4%	+12.1%	3.1%	23.0%
Antioch	Contra Costa	101,118	43.2%	55.7%	20.0%	+35.7%	7.2%	19.9%
Brentwood	Contra Costa	48,582	53.3%	43.2%	32.8%	+10.4%	7.4%	19.6%
Clayton	Contra Costa	10,856	66.6%	38.2%	38.5%	-0.3%	7.5%	19.1%
Concord	Contra Costa	121,989	46.6%	48.1%	25.1%	+23.0%	7.9%	22.0%
Danville	Contra Costa	41,994	65.9%	33.5%	42.1%	-8.6%	6.1%	20.8%
El Cerrito	Contra Costa	23,482	59.9%	64.0%	9.0%	+55.0%	5.6%	22.6%
Hercules	Contra Costa	23,556	52.2%	59.4%	13.9%	+45.5%	4.7%	23.8%
Lafayette	Contra Costa	23,863	69.6%	44.6%	30.6%	+14.0%	6.2%	20.9%
Martinez	Contra Costa	35,808	60.0%	48.9%	25.0%	+23.9%	8.3%	20.8%
Moraga	Contra Costa	16,033	63.8%	40.3%	33.3%	+7.0%	5.2%	23.1%
Oakley	Contra Costa	34,410	47.0%	53.8%	24.0%	+29.8%	7.2%	18.0%
Orinda	Contra Costa	17,599	73.6%	45.0%	30.4%	+14.6%	5.3%	21.3%
Pinole	Contra Costa	18,470	53.3%	57.8%	17.2%	+40.6%	6.2%	21.0%
Pittsburg	Contra Costa	62,528	40.9%	60.9%	14.3%	+46.6%	6.1%	21.0%
Pleasant Hill	Contra Costa	33,045	57.9%	46.5%	25.1%	+21.4%	7.7%	23.5%
Richmond	Contra Costa	103,161	40.2%	68.3%	7.9%	+60.4%	5.9%	19.7%
San Pablo	Contra Costa	29,224	28.0%	66.4%	8.0%	+58.4%	5.0%	22.1%
San Ramon	Contra Costa	69,241	50.0%	39.1%	29.8%	+9.3%	6.3%	27.5%
Walnut Creek	Contra Costa	64,168	65.7%	45.0%	30.0%	+15.0%	6.2%	21.1%
Crescent City	Del Norte	7,673	22.3%	35.5%	29.4%	+6.1%	15.3%	25.5%
Placerville	El Dorado	10,394	52.9%	34.0%	37.4%	-3.4%	11.5%	21.3%
South Lake Tahoe	El Dorado	21,814	42.4%	38.6%	22.8%	+15.8%	14.0%	29.0%
Clovis	Fresno	93,304	58.0%	29.1%	49.5%	-20.4%	8.2%	16.2%
Coalinga	Fresno	13,246	33.0%	38.6%	36.0%	+2.6%	8.4%	20.0%
Firebaugh	Fresno	7,474	28.0%	57.5%	22.0%	+35.5%	6.8%	16.0%
Fowler	Fresno	5,434	47.3%	44.1%	34.6%	+9.5%	4.6%	18.1%
Fresno	Fresno	489,922	45.4%	43.9%	33.5%	+10.4%	7.4%	17.7%
Huron	Fresno	6,733	14.5%	65.3%	14.0%	+51.3%	7.3%	15.8%
Kerman	Fresno	13,093	38.6%	47.0%	28.7%	+18.3%	11.6%	17.6%
Kingsburg	Fresno	11,221	55.0%	24.9%	56.0%	-31.1%	7.9%	14.1%
Mendota	Fresno	10,729	19.6%	67.8%	15.3%	+52.5%	3.8%	14.3%
Orange Cove	Fresno	8,889	29.4%	65.8%	15.0%	+50.8%	4.4%	16.3%
Parlier	Fresno	14,204	26.1%	60.8%	17.5%	+43.3%	4.5%	18.5%
Reedley	Fresno	23,968	36.4%	38.7%	40.3%	-1.6%	6.5%	16.7%
San Joaquin	Fresno	3,965	17.4%	60.5%	17.3%	+43.2%	6.1%	18.3%
Sanger	Fresno	23,814	41.8%	49.4%	30.0%	+19.4%	5.5%	17.0%
Selma	Fresno	22,939	36.6%	47.0%	33.0%	+14.0%	6.7%	15.8%
Orland	Glenn	7,214	40.6%	33.5%	40.3%	-6.8%	8.2%	21.3%
Willows	Glenn	6,190	40.4%	32.0%	41.4%	-9.4%	10.6%	20.4%
Arcata	Humboldt	17,118	71.9%	45.1%	10.2%	+34.9%	15.5%	32.2%
Blue Lake	Humboldt	1,336	61.4%	43.0%	20.4%	+22.6%	13.7%	26.1%
Eureka	Humboldt	27,027	53.6%	42.5%	25.3%	+17.2%	11.3%	24.1%
Ferndale	Humboldt	1,503	63.7%	39.4%	38.2%	+1.2%	7.5%	17.4%
Fortuna	Humboldt	11,753	54.6%	33.7%	38.1%	-4.4%	10.0%	22.0%
Rio Dell	Humboldt	3,342	50.9%	33.5%	35.3%	-1.8%	13.3%	23.1%
Trinidad	Humboldt	286	94.8%	52.8%	18.1%	+34.7%	9.2%	22.5%
Brawley	Imperial	24,645	37.1%	50.5%	26.7%	+23.8%	5.9%	19.1%
Calexico	Imperial	37,378	39.0%	61.8%	9.7%	+52.1%	4.2%	25.6%
Calipatria	Imperial	7,292	16.0%	53.7%	18.7%	+35.0%	6.5%	23.4%
El Centro	Imperial	42,141	38.1%	49.0%	25.6%	+23.4%	6.0%	21.6%
Holtville	Imperial	5,908	35.3%	45.0%	28.4%	+16.6%	8.2%	21.5%
Imperial	Imperial	14,017	40.9%	39.6%	32.4%	+7.2%	7.9%	23.1%
Westmorland	Imperial	1,714	42.8%	56.0%	19.5%	+36.5%	7.1%	20.0%
Bishop	Inyo	3,839	42.9%	31.4%	40.3%	-8.9%	10.4%	21.7%
Arvin	Kern	18,809	19.9%	63.5%	14.0%	+49.5%	4.6%	19.8%
Bakersfield	Kern	339,761	45.1%	36.2%	41.1%	-4.9%	6.9%	18.7%
California City	Kern	13,684	37.7%	33.0%	37.6%	-4.6%	11.7%	22.9%
Delano	Kern	52,342	22.6%	64.2%	18.3%	+45.9%	3.4%	15.5%
Maricopa	Kern	1,280	36.0%	23.0%	47.1%	-24.1%	15.6%	21.0%
McFarland	Kern	12,530	23.1%	59.2%	19.1%	+40.1%	4.1%	19.3%
Ridgecrest	Kern	27,587	49.2%	22.9%	49.5%	-26.6%	9.4%	22.1%
Shafter	Kern	16,709	29.3%	47.8%	31.1%	+16.7%	5.7%	17.9%
Taft	Kern	9,413	32.2%	22.6%	53.7%	-31.1%	8.7%	18.8%
Tehachapi	Kern	14,332	28.3%	25.5%	45.8%	-20.3%	10.7%	22.5%
Wasco	Kern	25,457	21.7%	52.8%	26.5%	+26.3%	5.0%	17.8%
Avenal	Kings	15,705	10.7%	53.7%	26.7%	+27.0%	5.3%	16.4%
Corcoran	Kings	25,113	17.1%	57.4%	26.3%	+31.1%	4.8%	13.4%
Hanford	Kings	53,159	41.1%	33.9%	47.0%	-13.1%	6.5%	15.2%
Lemoore	Kings	24,217	39.2%	31.9%	46.2%	-14.3%	7.2%	17.8%
Clearlake	Lake	15,134	45.8%	45.3%	18.0%	+27.3%	11.2%	29.7%
Lakeport	Lake	4,799	56.5%	38.2%	32.5%	+5.7%	9.8%	23.1%
Susanville	Lassen	17,728	25.2%	26.7%	44.1%	-17.4%	12.5%	22.0%
Agoura Hills	Los Angeles	20,353	70.3%	40.1%	33.8%	+6.3%	11.5%	17.4%
Alhambra	Los Angeles	83,301	45.4%	47.4%	19.1%	+28.3%	10.9%	24.4%
Arcadia	Los Angeles	57,251	49.6%	29.7%	30.9%	-1.2%	3.4%	36.1%
Artesia	Los Angeles	16,495	44.1%	46.9%	24.2%	+22.7%	9.8%	20.7%
Avalon	Los Angeles	3,690	46.6%	38.7%	34.9%	+3.8%	12.0%	17.1%
Azusa	Los Angeles	46,177	40.1%	46.8%	25.2%	+21.6%	11.9%	18.7%
Baldwin Park	Los Angeles	75,441	38.9%	54.5%	17.0%	+37.5%	10.2%	20.2%
Bell	Los Angeles	35,602	31.6%	61.7%	12.1%	+49.6%	9.2%	18.3%
Bell Gardens	Los Angeles	42,294	30.6%	61.5%	11.2%	+50.3%	9.6%	19.4%
Bellflower	Los Angeles	76,243	44.2%	51.5%	22.4%	+29.1%	11.4%	17.2%
Beverly Hills	Los Angeles	34,042	66.0%	45.3%	24.7%	+20.6%	10.1%	21.8%
Bradbury	Los Angeles	932	67.8%	24.5%	48.7%	-24.2%	8.1%	20.7%
Burbank	Los Angeles	103,037	59.4%	44.2%	26.7%	+17.5%	12.5%	19.0%
Calabasas	Los Angeles	22,839	67.8%	43.2%	31.0%	+12.2%	10.9%	17.2%
Carson	Los Angeles	91,508	58.3%	60.7%	14.8%	+45.9%	8.5%	17.8%
Cerritos	Los Angeles	49,281	64.8%	39.6%	28.5%	+11.1%	8.5%	25.0%
Claremont	Los Angeles	34,824	66.0%	45.0%	30.4%	+14.6%	10.7%	16.0%
Commerce	Los Angeles	12,791	49.0%	67.0%	11.0%	+56.0%	8.5%	15.0%
Compton	Los Angeles	96,102	47.2%	73.0%	6.8%	+66.2%	9.2%	12.8%
Covina	Los Angeles	47,662	53.6%	42.5%	32.5%	+10.0%	11.4%	16.4%
Cudahy	Los Angeles	23,846	28.1%	61.9%	11.6%	+50.3%	9.7%	18.1%
Culver City	Los Angeles	38,899	69.4%	57.0%	15.9%	+41.1%	11.2%	18.1%
Diamond Bar	Los Angeles	55,668	58.0%	34.5%	31.7%	+2.8%	10.5%	25.5%
Downey	Los Angeles	111,329	48.3%	50.1%	25.8%	+24.3%	10.3%	16.0%
Duarte	Los Angeles	21,363	55.9%	47.6%	26.5%	+21.1%	9.9%	18.3%
El Monte	Los Angeles	113,763	31.7%	50.9%	17.1%	+33.8%	11.1%	23.1%
El Segundo	Los Angeles	16,597	68.8%	33.5%	37.3%	-3.8%	13.2%	18.9%
Gardena	Los Angeles	58,743	51.8%	62.8%	15.5%	+47.3%	8.5%	15.0%
Glendale	Los Angeles	192,069	50.6%	40.7%	27.5%	+13.2%	11.5%	22.6%
Glendora	Los Angeles	50,000	63.6%	30.1%	46.0%	-15.9%	10.7%	16.1%
Hawaiian Gardens	Los Angeles	14,309	32.2%	53.8%	17.0%	+36.8%	10.8%	20.6%
Hawthorne	Los Angeles	84,293	42.8%	61.7%	13.3%	+48.4%	10.6%	16.4%
Hermosa Beach	Los Angeles	19,422	70.4%	35.4%	32.5%	+2.9%	13.7%	20.9%
Hidden Hills	Los Angeles	2,370	59.0%	38.7%	38.2%	+0.5%	9.8%	15.6%
Huntington Park	Los Angeles	58,465	28.5%	64.1%	11.0%	+53.1%	9.4%	17.1%
Industry	Los Angeles	518	19.7%	25.5%	53.9%	-28.4%	16.7%	9.8%
Inglewood	Los Angeles	109,967	49.8%	74.1%	6.1%	+68.0%	8.6%	12.8%
Irwindale	Los Angeles	1,525	61.0%	62.4%	15.5%	+46.9%	10.1%	15.0%
La Cañada Flintridge	Los Angeles	20,248	73.2%	30.0%	46.1%	-16.1%	8.5%	17.2%
La Habra Heights	Los Angeles	5,304	72.9%	23.1%	53.5%	-30.4%	9.8%	16.0%
La Mirada	Los Angeles	48,363	57.0%	38.2%	37.9%	+0.3%	10.2%	16.3%
La Puente	Los Angeles	39,957	39.5%	58.6%	15.9%	+42.7%	9.9%	17.5%
La Verne	Los Angeles	31,139	66.5%	34.4%	43.0%	-8.6%	10.3%	14.9%
Lakewood	Los Angeles	79,994	60.7%	44.5%	30.9%	+13.6%	10.9%	16.4%
Lancaster	Los Angeles	152,678	46.0%	39.9%	35.4%	+4.5%	14.4%	14.2%
Lawndale	Los Angeles	32,652	40.8%	54.0%	17.8%	+36.2%	11.5%	19.1%
Lomita	Los Angeles	20,246	56.4%	41.8%	32.1%	+9.7%	11.6%	17.2%
Long Beach	Los Angeles	462,197	54.2%	51.5%	21.1%	+30.4%	13.2%	16.6%
Los Angeles	Los Angeles	3,782,544	48.0%	56.1%	15.9%	+40.2%	12.1%	18.0%
Lynwood	Los Angeles	69,818	34.7%	66.5%	9.4%	+57.1%	9.4%	16.4%
Malibu	Los Angeles	12,746	72.3%	42.2%	29.4%	+12.8%	11.9%	19.1%
Manhattan Beach	Los Angeles	34,986	72.1%	35.8%	37.8%	-2.0%	11.0%	17.7%
Maywood	Los Angeles	27,454	30.4%	62.3%	10.1%	+52.2%	9.1%	19.8%
Monrovia	Los Angeles	36,622	56.9%	41.4%	32.2%	+9.2%	11.2%	17.7%
Montebello	Los Angeles	62,470	47.1%	59.0%	16.7%	+42.3%	9.2%	16.7%
Monterey Park	Los Angeles	60,251	46.3%	44.7%	19.0%	+25.7%	9.3%	28.5%
Norwalk	Los Angeles	105,348	45.1%	54.3%	19.9%	+34.4%	10.1%	17.8%
Palmdale	Los Angeles	149,001	45.2%	44.5%	30.6%	+13.9%	13.1%	15.2%
Palos Verdes Estates	Los Angeles	13,412	77.1%	25.4%	51.6%	-26.2%	8.7%	16.4%
Paramount	Los Angeles	54,196	36.4%	61.3%	13.5%	+47.8%	10.3%	16.8%
Pasadena	Los Angeles	136,807	58.2%	49.7%	23.2%	+26.5%	11.5%	17.7%
Pico Rivera	Los Angeles	63,004	51.5%	61.9%	15.8%	+46.1%	8.5%	15.4%
Pomona	Los Angeles	148,946	39.3%	52.1%	20.2%	+31.9%	12.3%	17.6%
Rancho Palos Verdes	Los Angeles	41,575	69.4%	31.7%	42.8%	-11.1%	9.1%	18.4%
Redondo Beach	Los Angeles	66,397	66.6%	38.0%	31.4%	+6.6%	13.4%	19.8%
Rolling Hills	Los Angeles	1,790	85.9%	19.3%	57.1%	-37.8%	10.2%	16.3%
Rolling Hills Estates	Los Angeles	8,040	74.6%	28.1%	49.9%	-21.8%	8.2%	15.5%
Rosemead	Los Angeles	53,725	38.5%	45.2%	17.4%	+27.8%	11.5%	28.2%
San Dimas	Los Angeles	33,523	64.4%	34.2%	41.7%	-7.5%	11.0%	16.0%
San Fernando	Los Angeles	23,638	38.6%	60.9%	12.5%	+48.4%	11.1%	17.2%
San Gabriel	Los Angeles	39,703	41.8%	41.4%	22.8%	+18.6%	10.8%	26.8%
San Marino	Los Angeles	13,131	67.9%	22.7%	42.1%	-19.4%	7.8%	28.9%
Santa Clarita	Los Angeles	218,442	60.4%	33.7%	40.8%	-7.1%	12.1%	16.5%
Santa Fe Springs	Los Angeles	16,333	58.5%	57.5%	20.5%	+37.0%	8.7%	15.3%
Santa Monica	Los Angeles	89,153	72.9%	53.7%	15.4%	+38.3%	13.5%	19.6%
Sierra Madre	Los Angeles	10,881	75.8%	38.0%	36.8%	+1.2%	11.0%	16.7%
Signal Hill	Los Angeles	10,842	56.5%	50.7%	21.6%	+29.1%	12.9%	17.6%
South El Monte	Los Angeles	20,197	35.7%	57.9%	13.4%	+44.5%	9.2%	21.4%
South Gate	Los Angeles	94,586	37.7%	62.6%	12.5%	+50.1%	9.2%	17.3%
South Pasadena	Los Angeles	25,465	65.4%	45.6%	24.1%	+21.5%	11.6%	20.8%
Temple City	Los Angeles	35,372	50.7%	35.3%	28.4%	+6.9%	10.6%	27.7%
Torrance	Los Angeles	144,622	58.2%	37.1%	35.5%	+1.6%	10.3%	19.3%
Vernon	Los Angeles	112	69.6%	23.1%	32.1%	-9.0%	26.9%	23.1%
Walnut	Los Angeles	29,269	62.2%	33.2%	28.0%	+5.2%	10.3%	30.3%
West Covina	Los Angeles	105,810	51.0%	46.7%	25.9%	+20.8%	10.8%	18.9%
West Hollywood	Los Angeles	34,564	76.3%	60.5%	9.9%	+50.6%	12.9%	18.8%
Westlake Village	Los Angeles	8,276	77.3%	31.9%	42.1%	-10.2%	11.6%	16.8%
Whittier	Los Angeles	85,161	54.2%	44.1%	33.2%	+10.9%	10.4%	14.8%
Chowchilla	Madera	18,465	22.5%	30.8%	45.1%	-14.3%	9.0%	18.8%
Madera	Madera	60,221	26.8%	44.9%	33.1%	+11.8%	6.2%	18.4%
Belvedere	Marin	2,118	72.0%	38.2%	34.1%	+4.1%	6.6%	23.9%
Corte Madera	Marin	9,191	65.6%	55.7%	16.9%	+38.8%	6.3%	23.3%
Fairfax	Marin	7,410	73.2%	64.4%	7.1%	+57.3%	9.1%	21.1%
Larkspur	Marin	11,870	69.8%	54.7%	18.4%	+36.3%	5.6%	23.2%
Mill Valley	Marin	13,810	71.1%	61.5%	12.3%	+49.2%	5.3%	22.6%
Novato	Marin	51,206	57.9%	49.6%	23.3%	+26.3%	7.7%	22.3%
Ross	Marin	2,079	80.3%	42.9%	30.1%	+12.8%	5.8%	23.5%
San Anselmo	Marin	12,273	69.8%	62.0%	11.6%	+50.4%	7.4%	21.0%
San Rafael	Marin	57,374	51.5%	55.1%	17.9%	+37.2%	6.3%	22.7%
Sausalito	Marin	7,047	75.3%	52.1%	15.8%	+36.3%	6.7%	27.6%
Tiburon	Marin	8,895	67.8%	46.0%	25.0%	+21.0%	5.4%	25.7%
Fort Bragg	Mendocino	7,211	45.5%	51.0%	17.9%	+33.1%	12.5%	22.4%
Point Arena	Mendocino	439	57.2%	51.8%	10.4%	+41.4%	17.9%	24.7%
Ukiah	Mendocino	15,979	47.8%	47.0%	23.6%	+23.4%	9.9%	22.5%
Willits	Mendocino	4,896	51.9%	45.9%	20.7%	+25.2%	13.4%	24.1%
Atwater	Merced	27,922	41.0%	39.4%	37.4%	+2.0%	8.2%	18.3%
Dos Palos	Merced	4,940	38.0%	44.4%	35.0%	+9.4%	9.9%	14.9%
Gustine	Merced	5,484	38.3%	48.2%	30.3%	+17.9%	7.7%	17.0%
Livingston	Merced	12,899	34.6%	62.2%	15.9%	+46.3%	4.9%	18.9%
Los Banos	Merced	35,252	37.6%	50.1%	27.6%	+22.5%	7.8%	17.7%
Merced	Merced	78,111	41.0%	46.4%	30.2%	+16.2%	8.2%	18.3%
Alturas	Modoc	2,813	54.7%	31.0%	42.4%	-11.4%	12.9%	19.5%
Mammoth Lakes	Mono	8,081	36.5%	35.0%	29.3%	+5.7%	10.3%	29.1%
Carmel-by-the-Sea	Monterey	3,728	74.8%	40.5%	33.6%	+6.9%	8.8%	20.4%
Del Rey Oaks	Monterey	1,734	65.1%	47.9%	26.4%	+21.5%	6.6%	21.8%
Gonzales	Monterey	8,074	34.6%	66.8%	14.0%	+52.8%	5.4%	15.9%
Greenfield	Monterey	15,864	26.3%	70.3%	11.6%	+58.7%	3.3%	16.0%
King City	Monterey	12,629	21.6%	58.7%	22.6%	+36.1%	4.1%	16.2%
Marina	Monterey	19,636	46.4%	48.2%	21.8%	+26.4%	7.9%	25.1%
Monterey	Monterey	27,861	49.8%	47.4%	24.6%	+22.8%	7.1%	23.4%
Pacific Grove	Monterey	14,995	64.0%	49.1%	23.6%	+25.5%	7.6%	22.3%
Salinas	Monterey	148,780	34.1%	60.2%	18.8%	+41.4%	4.6%	18.2%
Sand City	Monterey	292	51.0%	37.6%	24.8%	+12.8%	14.1%	29.5%
Seaside	Monterey	32,735	35.6%	54.1%	18.9%	+35.2%	6.7%	22.9%
Soledad	Monterey	25,548	19.5%	67.9%	11.4%	+56.5%	4.0%	18.1%
American Canyon	Napa	18,489	49.9%	52.1%	18.0%	+34.1%	7.4%	25.4%
Calistoga	Napa	5,159	43.7%	52.2%	21.5%	+30.7%	9.5%	20.5%
Napa	Napa	76,560	50.7%	47.8%	26.2%	+21.6%	8.6%	20.4%
St. Helena	Napa	5,838	56.8%	46.8%	26.6%	+20.2%	6.1%	22.6%
Yountville	Napa	2,943	68.5%	47.1%	25.9%	+21.2%	10.2%	20.8%
Grass Valley	Nevada	12,793	50.4%	36.9%	33.4%	+3.5%	10.7%	22.7%
Nevada City	Nevada	3,081	67.2%	44.5%	22.1%	+22.4%	13.3%	23.7%
Truckee	Nevada	16,009	52.8%	39.4%	24.4%	+15.0%	11.4%	28.8%
Aliso Viejo	Orange	47,037	51.8%	29.0%	40.6%	-11.6%	8.0%	25.5%
Anaheim	Orange	335,057	35.9%	38.2%	35.7%	+2.5%	6.7%	21.9%
Brea	Orange	38,837	55.8%	28.7%	47.7%	-19.0%	6.8%	19.4%
Buena Park	Orange	80,214	39.3%	39.4%	33.0%	+6.4%	6.6%	23.5%
Costa Mesa	Orange	109,796	45.2%	30.5%	39.0%	-8.5%	9.7%	24.3%
Cypress	Orange	47,610	51.8%	33.2%	40.3%	-7.1%	6.4%	22.6%
Dana Point	Orange	33,510	61.4%	26.2%	47.0%	-20.8%	9.2%	21.2%
Fountain Valley	Orange	55,209	56.4%	28.5%	46.1%	-17.6%	6.3%	21.4%
Fullerton	Orange	134,079	46.5%	32.8%	38.9%	-6.1%	6.9%	23.8%
Garden Grove	Orange	170,148	38.0%	35.6%	37.0%	-1.4%	6.5%	23.3%
Huntington Beach	Orange	189,744	57.7%	27.9%	45.6%	-17.7%	7.9%	21.6%
Irvine	Orange	205,057	50.8%	32.2%	33.6%	-1.4%	6.5%	30.1%
La Habra	Orange	60,117	38.8%	37.7%	37.6%	+0.1%	7.6%	20.0%
La Palma	Orange	15,536	49.3%	35.9%	37.7%	-1.8%	5.7%	22.9%
Laguna Beach	Orange	22,808	71.7%	37.3%	35.3%	+2.0%	8.7%	21.8%
Laguna Hills	Orange	30,477	55.7%	26.4%	46.7%	-20.3%	7.2%	22.3%
Laguna Niguel	Orange	62,855	59.6%	26.7%	47.3%	-20.6%	7.5%	21.5%
Laguna Woods	Orange	16,276	80.5%	38.1%	40.1%	-2.0%	6.2%	18.2%
Lake Forest	Orange	77,111	51.0%	27.2%	46.4%	-19.2%	7.8%	21.6%
Los Alamitos	Orange	11,442	51.5%	33.7%	41.4%	-7.7%	8.2%	19.8%
Mission Viejo	Orange	93,076	59.2%	26.4%	48.8%	-22.4%	7.1%	20.5%
Newport Beach	Orange	84,417	65.6%	20.7%	55.5%	-34.8%	6.8%	19.7%
Orange	Orange	135,582	46.5%	30.1%	45.0%	-14.9%	7.4%	20.3%
Placentia	Orange	50,089	48.9%	29.6%	45.7%	-16.1%	6.9%	20.4%
Rancho Santa Margarita	Orange	47,769	53.6%	24.3%	49.3%	-25.0%	7.3%	22.0%
San Clemente	Orange	62,052	59.9%	23.2%	50.5%	-27.3%	8.7%	21.0%
San Juan Capistrano	Orange	34,455	50.8%	26.4%	49.5%	-23.1%	7.8%	19.2%
Santa Ana	Orange	325,517	26.8%	53.4%	22.6%	+30.8%	5.2%	20.6%
Seal Beach	Orange	24,157	68.9%	34.0%	44.7%	-10.7%	6.9%	17.1%
Stanton	Orange	38,141	30.8%	41.2%	31.5%	+9.7%	6.8%	22.9%
Tustin	Orange	74,625	40.2%	32.5%	38.2%	-5.7%	7.0%	24.8%
Villa Park	Orange	5,825	71.9%	17.6%	64.4%	-46.8%	4.3%	15.4%
Westminster	Orange	89,440	42.7%	31.3%	39.8%	-8.5%	7.0%	24.5%
Yorba Linda	Orange	63,578	63.7%	21.5%	56.5%	-35.0%	6.3%	18.2%
Auburn	Placer	13,476	63.8%	30.9%	41.7%	-10.8%	7.4%	22.3%
Colfax	Placer	1,999	46.2%	28.3%	37.6%	-9.3%	11.8%	26.7%
Lincoln	Placer	40,177	61.5%	29.1%	48.3%	-19.2%	5.7%	19.1%
Loomis	Placer	6,511	64.5%	23.7%	51.6%	-27.9%	6.4%	20.3%
Rocklin	Placer	55,713	58.1%	26.6%	47.8%	-21.2%	7.0%	20.8%
Roseville	Placer	116,613	58.8%	29.3%	45.8%	-16.5%	6.2%	21.0%
Portola	Plumas	3,069	33.6%	33.1%	32.9%	+0.2%	17.0%	24.2%
Banning	Riverside	29,414	42.9%	38.9%	40.8%	-1.9%	8.2%	15.4%
Beaumont	Riverside	34,737	46.4%	33.6%	40.8%	-7.2%	10.3%	19.4%
Blythe	Riverside	21,102	23.1%	40.3%	36.0%	+4.3%	9.2%	18.3%
Calimesa	Riverside	7,923	53.7%	29.0%	48.8%	-19.8%	10.1%	16.2%
Canyon Lake	Riverside	10,663	57.3%	19.9%	57.5%	-37.6%	9.7%	16.8%
Cathedral City	Riverside	51,130	37.6%	46.9%	31.8%	+15.1%	6.2%	17.5%
Coachella	Riverside	39,442	25.0%	72.1%	13.1%	+59.0%	2.9%	12.8%
Corona	Riverside	152,111	43.0%	32.9%	43.3%	-10.4%	7.2%	19.2%
Desert Hot Springs	Riverside	25,793	35.5%	44.0%	32.7%	+11.3%	8.3%	18.0%
Eastvale	Riverside	53,437	40.6%	38.0%	34.2%	+3.8%	6.9%	23.6%
Hemet	Riverside	77,752	44.8%	34.0%	42.4%	-8.4%	9.3%	18.1%
Indian Wells	Riverside	4,937	59.8%	19.0%	62.7%	-43.7%	6.5%	14.4%
Indio	Riverside	74,402	39.7%	47.9%	33.0%	+14.9%	6.0%	15.4%
Jurupa Valley (Note: Population for this city obtained by summing the populations of Glen Avon, Mira Loma, Pedley, Rubidoux and Sunnyslope; see Jurupa Valley)	Riverside	57,464	58.4%	40.1%	37.1%	+3.0%	7.1%	18.3%
La Quinta	Riverside	36,600	52.8%	30.6%	47.4%	-16.8%	8.1%	17.2%
Lake Elsinore	Riverside	50,405	38.1%	33.8%	36.8%	-3.0%	9.7%	23.4%
Menifee	Riverside	75,023	52.0%	31.1%	44.2%	-13.1%	9.6%	19.0%
Moreno Valley	Riverside	190,977	43.5%	48.1%	33.5%	+14.6%	5.6%	14.8%
Murrieta	Riverside	99,476	48.8%	25.3%	48.2%	-22.9%	9.2%	20.8%
Norco	Riverside	27,131	45.0%	25.2%	52.5%	-27.3%	8.2%	17.2%
Palm Desert	Riverside	48,769	50.7%	31.5%	45.8%	-14.3%	7.6%	18.1%
Palm Springs	Riverside	45,045	53.7%	50.9%	26.7%	+24.2%	7.3%	17.9%
Perris	Riverside	65,993	36.3%	54.2%	27.8%	+26.4%	5.1%	14.6%
Rancho Mirage	Riverside	17,022	58.8%	33.2%	45.3%	-12.1%	5.8%	18.0%
Riverside	Riverside	303,569	44.0%	38.5%	39.0%	-0.5%	7.5%	17.6%
San Jacinto	Riverside	42,722	38.0%	36.5%	38.6%	-2.1%	9.3%	19.1%
Temecula	Riverside	98,189	48.0%	25.2%	47.6%	-22.4%	9.7%	21.4%
Wildomar	Riverside	31,452	47.4%	26.8%	45.4%	-18.6%	10.3%	21.4%
Citrus Heights	Sacramento	84,112	50.4%	34.4%	41.4%	-7.0%	9.5%	18.4%
Elk Grove	Sacramento	146,537	53.5%	43.5%	32.0%	+11.5%	7.0%	20.4%
Folsom	Sacramento	70,564	51.7%	29.6%	44.3%	-14.7%	7.9%	21.5%
Galt	Sacramento	23,393	43.2%	35.3%	40.2%	-4.9%	9.1%	19.2%
Isleton	Sacramento	702	47.9%	52.4%	22.9%	+29.5%	8.0%	20.5%
Rancho Cordova	Sacramento	64,072	49.0%	43.1%	33.2%	+9.9%	7.5%	19.0%
Sacramento	Sacramento	463,537	47.5%	52.4%	21.9%	+30.5%	7.1%	21.1%
Hollister	San Benito	34,733	43.8%	53.6%	23.2%	+30.4%	6.3%	19.4%
San Juan Bautista	San Benito	1,619	59.8%	50.8%	23.0%	+27.8%	9.8%	20.4%
Adelanto	San Bernardino	30,670	29.8%	48.8%	21.7%	+27.1%	11.1%	23.2%
Apple Valley	San Bernardino	68,316	52.3%	29.1%	46.1%	-17.0%	11.5%	18.4%
Barstow	San Bernardino	22,913	37.2%	41.5%	29.0%	+12.5%	11.0%	23.3%
Big Bear Lake	San Bernardino	5,109	56.7%	23.9%	51.6%	-27.7%	10.8%	17.9%
Chino	San Bernardino	78,050	42.0%	39.2%	36.9%	+2.3%	7.1%	19.8%
Chino Hills	San Bernardino	74,765	52.6%	31.8%	40.6%	-8.8%	6.9%	23.4%
Colton	San Bernardino	52,283	38.9%	49.9%	25.4%	+24.5%	7.5%	20.2%
Fontana	San Bernardino	192,779	38.2%	48.6%	24.7%	+23.9%	7.0%	22.5%
Grand Terrace	San Bernardino	12,132	54.9%	37.0%	39.3%	-2.3%	8.1%	18.9%
Hesperia	San Bernardino	88,247	41.7%	34.3%	38.2%	-3.9%	10.9%	21.2%
Highland	San Bernardino	52,777	45.5%	38.4%	37.4%	+1.0%	8.0%	19.5%
Loma Linda	San Bernardino	23,081	46.2%	32.9%	36.3%	-3.4%	8.5%	25.8%
Montclair	San Bernardino	36,802	35.8%	50.2%	23.5%	+26.7%	7.1%	21.8%
Needles	San Bernardino	4,910	39.1%	40.8%	28.7%	+12.1%	13.8%	22.8%
Ontario	San Bernardino	165,120	36.7%	46.9%	28.5%	+18.4%	7.1%	20.3%
Rancho Cucamonga	San Bernardino	163,151	53.8%	35.6%	39.5%	-3.9%	8.0%	20.3%
Redlands	San Bernardino	68,995	56.1%	33.9%	42.4%	-8.5%	8.9%	18.4%
Rialto	San Bernardino	99,501	39.6%	52.0%	23.7%	+28.3%	6.9%	20.1%
San Bernardino	San Bernardino	210,100	36.8%	46.5%	29.5%	+17.0%	7.7%	19.4%
Twentynine Palms	San Bernardino	25,786	22.1%	27.5%	41.1%	-13.6%	11.1%	24.9%
Upland	San Bernardino	74,021	52.0%	35.4%	40.7%	-5.3%	7.6%	19.3%
Victorville	San Bernardino	111,704	38.4%	43.5%	29.6%	+13.9%	10.0%	21.1%
Yucaipa	San Bernardino	50,862	54.1%	27.5%	48.9%	-21.4%	10.4%	17.5%
Yucca Valley	San Bernardino	20,508	48.0%	28.1%	45.3%	-17.2%	11.4%	20.1%
Carlsbad	San Diego	102,342	64.7%	28.0%	42.0%	-14.0%	8.5%	24.9%
Chula Vista	San Diego	236,218	48.2%	42.0%	27.7%	+14.3%	6.9%	26.1%
Coronado	San Diego	19,423	55.0%	24.5%	47.3%	-22.8%	8.0%	23.5%
Del Mar	San Diego	4,175	77.2%	34.2%	34.7%	-0.5%	7.4%	26.7%
El Cajon	San Diego	98,813	40.9%	33.7%	37.4%	-3.7%	9.5%	23.2%
Encinitas	San Diego	59,223	67.8%	35.1%	32.8%	+2.3%	9.0%	26.4%
Escondido	San Diego	142,573	41.8%	28.3%	42.4%	-14.1%	9.3%	23.7%
Imperial Beach	San Diego	26,348	42.9%	37.1%	26.7%	+10.4%	10.4%	29.6%
La Mesa	San Diego	56,722	58.3%	37.9%	32.5%	+5.4%	9.8%	23.6%
Lemon Grove	San Diego	25,250	51.2%	44.5%	27.7%	+16.8%	8.4%	22.6%
National City	San Diego	58,015	32.9%	48.9%	19.5%	+29.4%	7.0%	27.2%
Oceanside	San Diego	166,139	50.5%	31.6%	37.8%	-6.2%	9.2%	25.1%
Poway	San Diego	47,762	61.5%	24.8%	45.7%	-20.9%	7.8%	24.8%
San Diego	San Diego	1,296,437	52.6%	40.2%	27.0%	+13.2%	8.2%	27.7%
San Marcos	San Diego	80,709	48.5%	29.3%	40.6%	-11.3%	9.1%	24.8%
Santee	San Diego	53,302	59.2%	27.0%	43.9%	-16.9%	9.7%	23.2%
Solana Beach	San Diego	12,864	68.0%	32.4%	37.1%	-4.7%	7.4%	26.0%
Vista	San Diego	93,293	40.6%	29.9%	39.6%	-9.7%	9.4%	24.8%
San Francisco	San Francisco	797,983	62.4%	55.6%	8.6%	+47.0%	6.4%	31.1%
Escalon	San Joaquin	7,106	51.3%	31.0%	47.1%	-16.1%	9.0%	16.5%
Lathrop	San Joaquin	17,488	40.1%	49.3%	25.9%	+23.4%	6.9%	20.5%
Lodi	San Joaquin	62,354	45.5%	30.7%	50.2%	-19.5%	7.0%	14.9%
Manteca	San Joaquin	66,081	46.0%	39.0%	37.3%	+1.7%	8.9%	18.3%
Ripon	San Joaquin	14,021	56.0%	24.4%	54.9%	-30.5%	8.0%	16.1%
Stockton	San Joaquin	289,926	41.7%	52.7%	30.0%	+22.7%	5.3%	14.0%
Tracy	San Joaquin	81,115	41.7%	44.3%	30.2%	+14.1%	7.4%	21.1%
Arroyo Grande	San Luis Obispo	17,132	65.5%	34.2%	41.8%	-7.6%	8.1%	18.7%
Atascadero	San Luis Obispo	28,194	58.9%	30.8%	43.9%	-13.1%	8.2%	19.8%
El Paso de Robles (Paso Robles)	San Luis Obispo	29,270	52.1%	29.6%	45.3%	-15.7%	8.2%	19.9%
Grover Beach	San Luis Obispo	13,175	50.6%	37.3%	34.0%	+3.3%	9.3%	22.5%
Morro Bay	San Luis Obispo	10,263	68.4%	39.5%	31.6%	+7.9%	9.5%	22.2%
Pismo Beach	San Luis Obispo	7,753	70.4%	32.2%	41.5%	-9.3%	8.9%	20.3%
San Luis Obispo	San Luis Obispo	45,130	59.2%	40.0%	29.1%	+10.9%	9.0%	24.6%
Atherton	San Mateo	6,883	72.7%	31.9%	41.1%	-9.2%	5.1%	23.8%
Belmont	San Mateo	25,568	59.4%	49.4%	20.8%	+28.6%	6.3%	25.8%
Brisbane	San Mateo	4,179	57.8%	54.9%	12.8%	+42.1%	7.0%	27.5%
Burlingame	San Mateo	28,514	56.1%	48.5%	22.3%	+26.2%	5.8%	25.6%
Colma	San Mateo	1,785	35.0%	59.1%	10.6%	+48.5%	6.7%	26.0%
Daly City	San Mateo	100,556	38.8%	55.6%	12.3%	+43.3%	4.9%	29.0%
East Palo Alto	San Mateo	28,077	30.3%	64.4%	8.7%	+55.7%	4.9%	23.5%
Foster City	San Mateo	30,133	51.3%	45.2%	21.2%	+24.0%	4.6%	30.7%
Half Moon Bay	San Mateo	11,228	58.3%	47.3%	22.6%	+24.7%	7.7%	24.9%
Hillsborough	San Mateo	10,748	66.9%	31.8%	39.5%	-7.7%	5.2%	25.5%
Menlo Park	San Mateo	31,669	57.1%	50.6%	21.5%	+29.1%	4.8%	24.7%
Millbrae	San Mateo	21,275	54.0%	47.9%	20.9%	+27.0%	5.8%	27.6%
Pacifica	San Mateo	37,043	61.5%	55.4%	15.8%	+39.6%	7.6%	23.9%
Portola Valley	San Mateo	4,326	76.1%	44.7%	29.2%	+15.5%	5.4%	22.4%
Redwood City	San Mateo	76,031	47.6%	50.7%	20.7%	+30.0%	5.9%	24.8%
San Bruno	San Mateo	40,677	49.4%	56.0%	15.8%	+40.2%	6.2%	24.3%
San Carlos	San Mateo	28,130	66.2%	48.2%	24.2%	+24.0%	6.2%	23.8%
San Mateo	San Mateo	95,957	50.7%	51.2%	20.2%	+31.0%	6.0%	24.9%
South San Francisco	San Mateo	62,822	44.6%	57.4%	13.4%	+44.0%	5.2%	26.0%
Woodside	San Mateo	5,263	74.3%	36.9%	34.4%	+2.5%	6.0%	25.0%
Buellton	Santa Barbara	4,712	54.3%	33.1%	41.7%	-8.6%	7.3%	20.4%
Carpinteria	Santa Barbara	13,106	49.7%	47.3%	26.3%	+21.0%	8.2%	20.9%
Goleta	Santa Barbara	29,634	54.1%	44.3%	27.9%	+16.4%	7.1%	22.8%
Guadalupe	Santa Barbara	6,901	27.3%	57.2%	15.3%	+41.9%	7.1%	22.6%
Lompoc	Santa Barbara	42,178	34.1%	37.7%	35.5%	+2.2%	9.1%	21.1%
Santa Barbara	Santa Barbara	88,192	52.2%	50.8%	20.4%	+30.4%	8.1%	23.1%
Santa Maria	Santa Barbara	96,803	27.8%	40.3%	33.5%	+6.8%	7.5%	21.4%
Solvang	Santa Barbara	5,237	58.3%	30.2%	46.5%	-16.3%	7.3%	18.6%
Campbell	Santa Clara	39,108	53.4%	45.3%	23.8%	+21.5%	7.3%	26.2%
Cupertino	Santa Clara	57,459	48.2%	37.0%	20.0%	+17.0%	4.0%	40.4%
Gilroy	Santa Clara	47,808	42.7%	48.5%	25.2%	+23.3%	6.8%	22.1%
Los Altos	Santa Clara	28,752	67.4%	41.5%	29.4%	+12.1%	4.3%	26.2%
Los Altos Hills	Santa Clara	7,912	73.6%	34.9%	33.6%	+1.3%	4.3%	28.7%
Los Gatos	Santa Clara	29,165	65.0%	41.0%	31.5%	+9.5%	6.2%	23.7%
Milpitas	Santa Clara	66,038	40.4%	42.5%	19.2%	+23.3%	5.3%	35.0%
Monte Sereno	Santa Clara	3,338	73.7%	37.1%	36.9%	+0.2%	6.1%	22.3%
Morgan Hill	Santa Clara	37,278	52.6%	40.9%	32.0%	+8.9%	6.9%	23.0%
Mountain View	Santa Clara	73,394	46.0%	49.1%	16.4%	+32.7%	5.3%	30.8%
Palo Alto	Santa Clara	63,475	59.7%	52.6%	15.5%	+37.1%	3.8%	29.2%
San Jose	Santa Clara	939,688	44.6%	46.8%	20.6%	+26.2%	6.0%	28.8%
Santa Clara	Santa Clara	114,482	41.9%	46.5%	19.9%	+26.6%	6.1%	29.7%
Saratoga	Santa Clara	29,781	66.8%	34.2%	31.5%	+2.7%	3.9%	31.8%
Sunnyvale	Santa Clara	138,436	41.1%	45.0%	19.9%	+25.1%	5.0%	31.8%
Capitola	Santa Cruz	9,864	64.7%	53.8%	17.1%	+36.7%	8.8%	22.8%
Santa Cruz	Santa Cruz	59,022	72.6%	58.8%	8.9%	+49.9%	9.2%	25.1%
Scotts Valley	Santa Cruz	11,480	66.7%	42.1%	30.5%	+11.6%	8.7%	21.7%
Watsonville	Santa Cruz	50,291	32.0%	64.2%	12.4%	+51.8%	5.3%	19.8%
Anderson	Shasta	9,927	45.1%	30.7%	38.8%	-8.1%	11.4%	24.0%
Redding	Shasta	89,674	53.4%	26.5%	46.7%	-20.2%	8.6%	21.5%
Shasta Lake	Shasta	10,121	51.0%	29.5%	39.1%	-9.6%	10.9%	24.7%
Loyalton	Sierra	890	49.1%	32.3%	38.7%	-6.4%	14.6%	19.9%
Dorris	Siskiyou	872	42.5%	30.5%	42.3%	-11.8%	8.4%	22.4%
Dunsmuir	Siskiyou	1,663	56.2%	41.5%	24.5%	+17.0%	13.7%	24.6%
Etna	Siskiyou	721	58.5%	29.1%	46.0%	-16.9%	9.7%	18.7%
Fort Jones	Siskiyou	595	63.5%	30.4%	44.4%	-14.0%	10.1%	18.8%
Montague	Siskiyou	1,510	47.8%	24.8%	44.6%	-19.8%	12.3%	23.8%
Mount Shasta	Siskiyou	3,411	59.8%	42.6%	25.3%	+17.3%	10.4%	25.3%
Tulelake	Siskiyou	981	24.9%	22.5%	54.5%	-32.0%	8.6%	18.4%
Weed	Siskiyou	2,947	44.8%	45.6%	24.0%	+21.6%	14.5%	21.7%
Yreka	Siskiyou	7,696	52.3%	30.8%	42.5%	-11.7%	11.0%	20.3%
Benicia	Solano	26,981	68.1%	47.2%	25.3%	+21.9%	8.4%	22.1%
Dixon	Solano	18,141	50.7%	38.8%	35.4%	+3.4%	7.3%	21.4%
Fairfield	Solano	104,404	48.1%	48.7%	24.4%	+24.3%	6.8%	22.7%
Rio Vista	Solano	7,088	72.6%	42.7%	33.9%	+8.8%	9.0%	18.2%
Suisun City	Solano	27,900	49.1%	52.4%	20.2%	+32.2%	7.0%	23.2%
Vacaville	Solano	92,217	50.1%	39.6%	33.2%	+6.4%	8.5%	22.1%
Vallejo	Solano	116,021	48.8%	59.9%	14.5%	+45.4%	6.1%	21.8%
Cloverdale	Sonoma	8,390	51.8%	49.1%	24.7%	+24.4%	7.9%	21.1%
Cotati	Sonoma	7,154	57.4%	52.8%	17.8%	+35.0%	10.3%	22.4%
Healdsburg	Sonoma	11,161	56.5%	52.6%	21.7%	+30.9%	7.5%	20.6%
Petaluma	Sonoma	57,265	57.5%	52.3%	20.5%	+31.8%	7.8%	22.0%
Rohnert Park	Sonoma	40,741	50.1%	49.6%	21.3%	+28.3%	8.8%	23.2%
Santa Rosa	Sonoma	164,976	50.9%	52.1%	21.4%	+30.7%	7.7%	21.4%
Sebastopol	Sonoma	7,359	69.6%	61.4%	11.4%	+50.0%	9.8%	19.5%
Sonoma	Sonoma	10,430	65.0%	51.2%	22.8%	+28.4%	8.1%	20.8%
Windsor	Sonoma	26,229	54.4%	46.6%	27.5%	+19.1%	7.5%	21.1%
Ceres	Stanislaus	44,731	42.6%	46.4%	33.0%	+13.4%	7.1%	16.1%
Hughson	Stanislaus	6,425	50.8%	32.2%	44.8%	-12.6%	8.4%	17.8%
Modesto	Stanislaus	201,886	48.6%	41.9%	37.5%	+4.4%	7.7%	15.7%
Newman	Stanislaus	9,989	37.4%	42.9%	33.4%	+9.5%	8.7%	18.2%
Oakdale	Stanislaus	20,364	48.1%	31.2%	45.0%	-13.8%	9.9%	17.6%
Patterson	Stanislaus	19,697	39.4%	49.9%	25.7%	+24.2%	8.2%	19.3%
Riverbank	Stanislaus	22,198	41.9%	39.9%	36.7%	+3.2%	7.7%	18.6%
Turlock	Stanislaus	67,953	44.9%	38.4%	39.3%	-0.9%	7.6%	17.3%
Waterford	Stanislaus	8,395	41.2%	31.7%	41.9%	-10.2%	9.1%	21.0%
Live Oak	Sutter	8,244	35.9%	44.5%	29.9%	+14.6%	8.9%	19.6%
Yuba City	Sutter	64,224	42.6%	34.2%	41.3%	-7.1%	9.2%	18.7%
Corning	Tehama	7,624	33.8%	35.2%	35.1%	+0.1%	11.7%	22.8%
Red Bluff	Tehama	14,026	42.1%	33.8%	37.2%	-3.4%	12.8%	21.6%
Tehama	Tehama	383	54.3%	35.1%	39.9%	-4.8%	15.4%	16.8%
Dinuba	Tulare	21,163	30.0%	44.4%	35.4%	+9.0%	5.5%	16.9%
Exeter	Tulare	10,255	40.2%	26.9%	50.6%	-23.7%	9.9%	16.8%
Farmersville	Tulare	10,445	22.4%	46.9%	24.3%	+22.6%	8.9%	23.9%
Lindsay	Tulare	11,664	20.8%	47.4%	23.8%	+23.6%	7.7%	24.0%
Porterville	Tulare	53,531	29.3%	36.3%	39.3%	-3.0%	8.7%	19.3%
Tulare	Tulare	58,150	34.9%	35.6%	42.1%	-6.5%	7.8%	17.8%
Visalia	Tulare	121,882	42.4%	31.1%	46.4%	-15.3%	8.5%	17.4%
Woodlake	Tulare	7,252	22.4%	52.7%	21.0%	+31.7%	7.6%	21.6%
Sonora	Tuolumne	4,899	55.0%	38.2%	32.4%	+5.8%	10.7%	22.8%
Camarillo	Ventura	64,340	63.2%	33.1%	43.2%	-10.1%	7.8%	18.6%
Fillmore	Ventura	14,863	42.7%	47.0%	27.8%	+19.2%	7.7%	20.0%
Moorpark	Ventura	34,100	58.6%	33.8%	40.8%	-7.0%	7.8%	20.2%
Ojai	Ventura	7,496	65.9%	46.0%	27.3%	+18.7%	9.1%	20.2%
Oxnard	Ventura	194,972	36.4%	51.6%	22.5%	+29.1%	6.4%	21.5%
Port Hueneme	Ventura	21,717	40.4%	47.5%	25.2%	+22.3%	8.1%	21.8%
San Buenaventura (Ventura)	Ventura	105,809	61.1%	42.4%	32.3%	+10.1%	8.5%	19.4%
Santa Paula	Ventura	29,248	39.8%	53.4%	23.7%	+29.7%	6.6%	18.5%
Simi Valley	Ventura	122,864	57.8%	30.3%	44.7%	-14.4%	8.2%	19.6%
Thousand Oaks	Ventura	125,633	62.4%	31.9%	41.8%	-9.9%	8.0%	21.0%
Davis	Yolo	65,359	57.6%	54.0%	14.7%	+39.3%	7.1%	26.3%
West Sacramento	Yolo	47,278	48.9%	44.7%	26.0%	+18.7%	9.4%	23.4%
Winters	Yolo	6,616	50.3%	44.8%	27.6%	+17.2%	7.8%	22.6%
Woodland	Yolo	55,229	46.9%	43.7%	30.4%	+13.3%	8.2%	20.9%
Marysville	Yuba	12,248	38.9%	35.0%	37.9%	-2.9%	9.6%	21.4%
Wheatland	Yuba	3,381	47.0%	25.5%	48.2%	-22.7%	11.3%	19.9%

== See also ==
- California
- California locations by crime rate
- California locations by income
- California locations by race
- Politics of California
- Political party strength in California
