= Phoenix Lake-Cedar Ridge, California =

Unincorporated community in California, United States

Phoenix Lake-Cedar Ridge
- unincorporated community and former census-designated place
- Location in Tuolumne County and the state of California
- Coordinates: 38°1′10″N 120°17′52″W
- Country: United States
- State: California
- County: Tuolumne

Area
  - Total: 25.4 sq mi (65.8 km^{2})
  - Land: 25.3 sq mi (65.4 km^{2})
  - Water: 0.15 sq mi (0.4 km^{2})

Population (2000)
  - Total: 5'108
  - Density: 202/sq mi (77.9/km^{2})
- Time zone: UTC-8 (Pacific (PST))
  - Summer (DST): UTC-7 (PDT)
- ZIP code: 95370
- Area code: 209
- FIPS code: 06-56871

Phoenix Lake-Cedar Ridge is an unincorporated community and a former census-designated place (CDP) in Tuolumne County, California, United States. The population was 5,108 at the 2000 census.

It was abolished prior to the 2010 census, and Phoenix Lake and Cedar Ridge became CDPs.

== Geography ==
Phoenix Lake-Cedar Ridge is located at 38°1′10″N 120°17′52″W (38.019488, -120.297883).

According to the United States Census Bureau, the CDP had a total area of 25.4 square miles (66 km^{2}), of which, 25.2 square miles (65 km^{2}) of it was land and 0.1 square miles (0.26 km^{2}) of it (0.55%) was water.

== Demographics ==
As of the census of 2000, there were 5,123 people, 2,044 households, and 1,580 families residing in the CDP. The population density was 203.0 inhabitants per square mile (78.4/km^{2}). There were 2,473 housing units at an average density of 98.0 per square mile (37.8/km^{2}). The racial makeup of the CDP was 94.5% White, 0.4% African American, 1.1% Native American, 0.7% Asian, 0.2% Pacific Islander, 1.1% from other races, and 2.1% from two or more races. Hispanic or Latino of any race were 5.0% of the population.

There were 2,044 households, out of which 27.7% had children under the age of 18 living with them, 66.2% were married couples living together, 7.6% had a female householder with no husband present, and 22.7% were non-families. 18.2% of all households were made up of individuals, and 8.8% had someone living alone who was 65 years of age or older. The average household size was 2.51 and the average family size was 2.80.

In the CDP, the population was spread out, with 23.2% under the age of 18, 4.8% from 18 to 24, 19.6% from 25 to 44, 32.1% from 45 to 64, and 20.3% who were 65 years of age or older. The median age was 46 years. For every 100 females, there were 96.7 males. For every 100 females age 18 and over, there were 95.7 males.

The median income for a household in the CDP was $44,699, and the median income for a family was $47,807. Males had a median income of $41,136 versus $26,923 for females. The per capita income for the CDP was $22,853. About 4.0% of families and 7.5% of the population were below the poverty line, including 7.0% of those under age 18 and 3.4% of those age 65 or over.

== Politics ==
In the state legislature Phoenix Lake-Cedar Ridge is located in the 14th Senate District, represented by Republican Tom Berryhill, and in the 25th Assembly District, represented by Republican Kristin Olsen.

In the United States House of Representatives, Phoenix Lake-Cedar Ridge is in California's 4th congressional district, represented by Democrat Mike Thompson.
