= Lake Vernon (disambiguation) =

Lake Vernon may mean:

- Lake Vernon, a lake in Yosemite National Park, California
- Lake Vernon, a lake near Huntsville, Ontario

== See also ==
- Vernon Lake, a man-made lake in Vernon Parish, Louisiana
- Vernon Lake (Idaho), a glacial lake in Boise County
