= Phoenix Lake, California =

Phoenix Lake
- census-designated place
- Location in Tuolumne County and the state of California

- Position in California.
- Coordinates: 38°00′15″N 120°18′38″W
- Country: United States
- State: California
- County: Tuolumne

Area
  - Total: 11.202 sq mi (29.013 km^{2})
  - Land: 11.073 sq mi (28.679 km^{2})
  - Water: 0.129 sq mi (0.334 km^{2}) 1.15%
- Elevation: 2,418 ft (737 m)

Population (2020)
  - Total: 4,264
  - Density: 385.1/sq mi (148.7/km^{2})
- Time zone: UTC-8 (Pacific (PST))
  - Summer (DST): UTC-7 (PDT)
- GNIS feature ID: 2633170

Phoenix Lake is a census-designated place (CDP) in Tuolumne County, California, United States. The 2020 United States census reported Phoenix Lake's population as 4,264. Phoenix lake was created a CDP for the 2010 census; previously, it was part of the Phoenix Lake-Cedar Ridge CDP.

== Geography ==
According to the United States Census Bureau, the CDP covers an area of 11.2 square miles (29.0 km^{2}), of which 98.85% is land and 1.15% is water.

== Demographics ==
Historical population
Census	Pop.	Note	%±
2010	4,269		—
2020	4,264		−0.1%
U.S. Decennial Census; 1850–1870 1880-1890; 1900 1910 1920; 1930 1940 1950; 1960 1970 1980; 1990 2000 2010

Phoenix Lake first appeared as a census designated place in the 2010 U.S. census formed from part of deleted Phoenix Lake-Cedar Ridge CDP and part of Mono Vista CDP.

=== Racial and ethnic composition ===
Phoenix Lake CDP, California – Racial and ethnic composition Note: the US Census treats Hispanic/Latino as an ethnic category. This table excludes Latinos from the racial categories and assigns them to a separate category. Hispanics/Latinos may be of any race.
Race / Ethnicity (NH = Non-Hispanic)	Pop 2010	Pop 2020	% 2010	% 2020
White alone (NH)	3,781	3,578	88.57%	83.91%
Black or African American alone (NH)	15	11	0.35%	0.26%
Native American or Alaska Native alone (NH)	33	38	0.77%	0.89%
Asian alone (NH)	49	28	1.15%	0.66%
Native Hawaiian or Pacific Islander alone (NH)	3	4	0.07%	0.09%
Other race alone (NH)	4	18	0.09%	0.42%
Mixed race or Multiracial (NH)	79	235	1.85%	5.51%
Hispanic or Latino (any race)	305	352	7.14%	8.26%
Total	4,269	4,264	100.00%	100.00%

=== 2020 census ===
As of the 2020 census, Phoenix Lake had a population of 4,264 and a population density of 385.1 inhabitants per square mile (148.7/km^{2}).

The age distribution was 17.1% under the age of 18, 5.1% aged 18 to 24, 17.6% aged 25 to 44, 26.0% aged 45 to 64, and 34.2% who were 65 years of age or older. The median age was 55.2 years. For every 100 females, there were 95.8 males, and for every 100 females age 18 and over there were 94.4 males age 18 and over.

The census reported that 99.8% of the population lived in households, 0.2% lived in non-institutionalized group quarters, and no one was institutionalized. 67.0% of residents lived in urban areas, while 33.0% lived in rural areas.

There were 1,781 households, out of which 22.7% included children under the age of 18, 57.4% were married-couple households, 5.7% were cohabiting couple households, 20.5% had a female householder with no partner present, and 16.4% had a male householder with no partner present. 23.4% of households were one person, and 14.2% were one person aged 65 or older. The average household size was 2.39. There were 1,282 families (72.0% of all households).

There were 1,974 housing units at an average density of 178.3 units per square mile (68.8 units/km^{2}), of which 1,781 (90.2%) were occupied and 9.8% were vacant. Of the occupied units, 87.0% were owner-occupied and 13.0% were occupied by renters. The homeowner vacancy rate was 1.3% and the rental vacancy rate was 13.2%.

Racial composition as of the 2020 census
Race	Number	Percent
White	3,681	86.3%
Black or African American	12	0.3%
American Indian and Alaska Native	47	1.1%
Asian	32	0.8%
Native Hawaiian and Other Pacific Islander	4	0.1%
Some other race	74	1.7%
Two or more races	414	9.7%
