= Lake Vernon =

Lake in California, United States

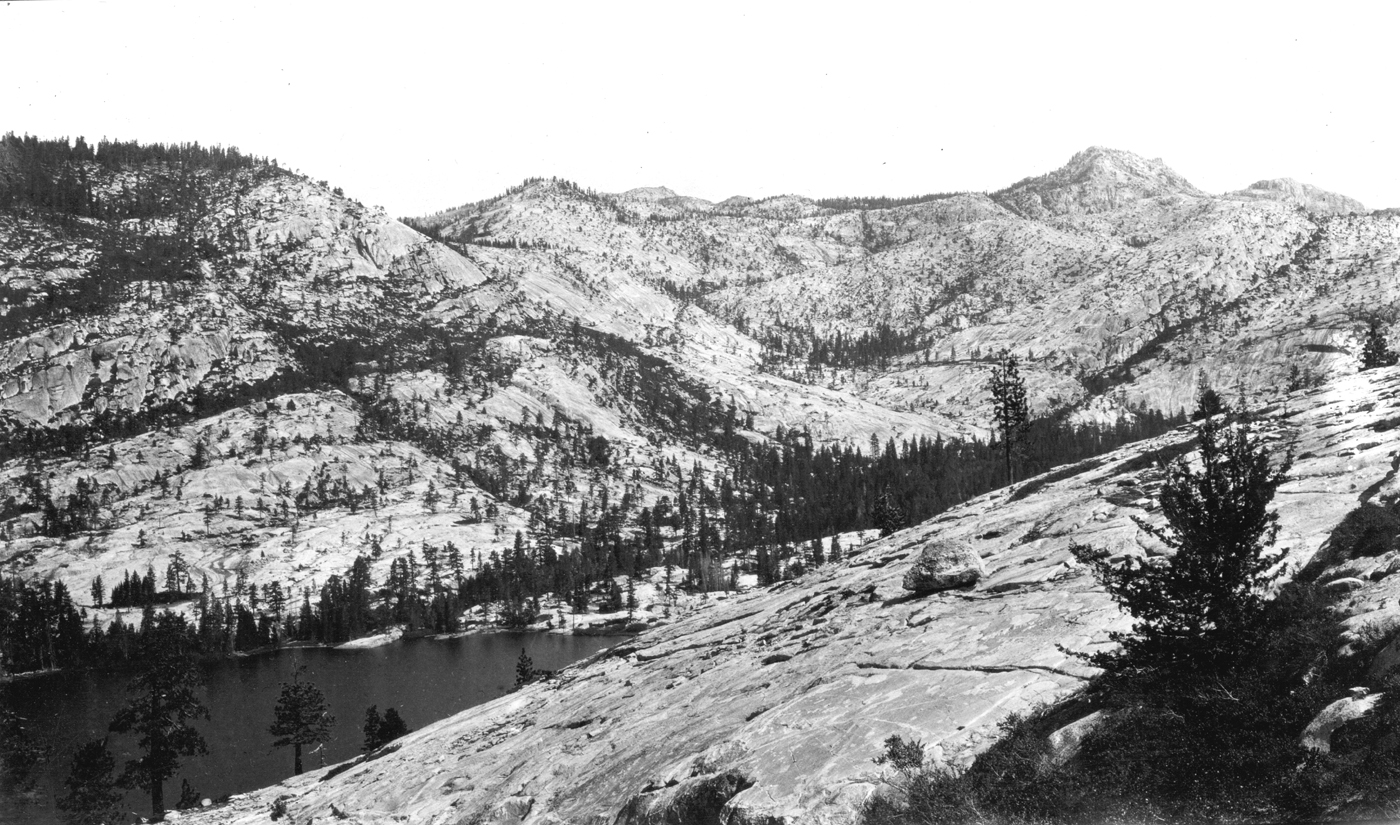
- North across the upper part of Lake Vernon, which lies in a region of prevailing massive granite. Mahan Peak on the right.

- Location within California Location within the United States
- Location: Yosemite National Park, Tuolumne County, California, United States
- Coordinates: 38°00′49″N 119°43′26″W
- Basin countries: United States
- Surface elevation: 6,568 feet (2,002 m)

Lake Vernon is located in the Tiltill Valley in the northern sector of Yosemite National Park just north of Hetch Hetchy Valley. The surface elevation of the lake is 6,568 ft (2,002 m). Due to the remote location of the lake, it is usually only accessed as a backpacking destination. The area surrounding the lake was once home to a band of Sierra Miwok Indians, and numerous artifacts can be found in the area. Lake Vernon is the source of Falls Creek, which feeds Wapama Falls.

== See also ==
- List of lakes in California
