= Mi-Wuk Village, California =

Mi-Wuk Village
- census-designated place
- Location in Tuolumne County and the state of California

- Location in the United States
- Coordinates: 38°03′25″N 120°10′46″W
- Country: United States
- State: California
- County: Tuolumne

Area
  - Total: 2.842 sq mi (7.361 km^{2})
  - Land: 2.836 sq mi (7.344 km^{2})
  - Water: 0.0066 sq mi (0.017 km^{2}) 0.23%
- Elevation: 4,344 ft (1,324 m)

Population (2020)
  - Total: 935
  - Density: 330/sq mi (127/km^{2})
- Time zone: UTC-8 (Pacific (PST))
  - Summer (DST): UTC-7 (PDT)
- ZIP code: 95346
- Area code: 209
- FIPS code: 06-48298
- GNIS feature ID: 2408846

Mi-Wuk Village is a census-designated place (CDP) in Tuolumne County, California, United States. The population was 935 at the 2020 census, down from 941 at the 2010 census. It was named after the Miwok Indians by the real estate developer and promoter Harry Hoeffler in 1955.

== Geography ==
According to the United States Census Bureau, the CDP has a total area of 2.8 square miles (7.4 km^{2}), of which 99.77% is land and 0.23% is water.

At the 2000 census, the CDP had a land area of 3.36 square miles (8.7 km^{2}).

=== Climate ===
This region experiences warm (but not hot) and dry summers, with no average monthly temperatures above 71.6 °F. According to the Köppen Climate Classification system, Mi-Wuk Village has a warm-summer Mediterranean climate, abbreviated "Csb" on climate maps.

Climate data for Mi-Wuk Village, California
Month	Jan	Feb	Mar	Apr	May	Jun	Jul	Aug	Sep	Oct	Nov	Dec	Year
Record high °F (°C)	73 (23)	74 (23)	80 (27)	84 (29)	92 (33)	99 (37)	105 (41)	103 (39)	99 (37)	93 (34)	82 (28)	76 (24)	105 (41)
Mean daily maximum °F (°C)	49.0 (9.4)	50.8 (10.4)	54.1 (12.3)	59.8 (15.4)	68.8 (20.4)	78.4 (25.8)	86.2 (30.1)	85.6 (29.8)	79.9 (26.6)	69 (21)	55.9 (13.3)	48.7 (9.3)	65.5 (18.7)
Mean daily minimum °F (°C)	29.0 (−1.7)	29.5 (−1.4)	31.9 (−0.1)	34.9 (1.6)	43.1 (6.2)	51.8 (11.0)	57.9 (14.4)	56.5 (13.6)	52.8 (11.6)	42.5 (5.8)	34.7 (1.5)	29.3 (−1.5)	41.2 (5.1)
Record low °F (°C)	4 (−16)	−2 (−19)	6 (−14)	14 (−10)	22 (−6)	29 (−2)	39 (4)	35 (2)	30 (−1)	17 (−8)	12 (−11)	−3 (−19)	−3 (−19)
Average precipitation inches (mm)	8.0 (200)	6.8 (170)	6.2 (160)	3.8 (97)	2.3 (58)	0.7 (18)	0.2 (5.1)	0.1 (2.5)	0.7 (18)	2.6 (66)	4.5 (110)	7.9 (200)	43.8 (1,104.6)
Average snowfall inches (cm)	22.8 (58)	23.9 (61)	19.8 (50)	11.3 (29)	0.9 (2.3)	0.0 (0.0)	0.0 (0.0)	0.0 (0.0)	0.0 (0.0)	0.3 (0.76)	6.0 (15)	20 (51)	105 (267.06)
Source: Weatherbase

== Demographics ==
Historical population
Census	Pop.	Note	%±
1990	1,175		—
2000	1,485		26.4%
2010	941		−36.6%
2020	935		−0.6%
U.S. Decennial Census; 1990 2000 2010

Mi-Wuk Village first appeared as a census designated place in the 1990 U.S. census. In the 2010 U.S. census, part of it was split off into the Sierra Village CDP.

=== Racial and ethnic composition ===
Mi-Wuk Village CDP, California – Racial and ethnic composition Note: the US Census treats Hispanic/Latino as an ethnic category. This table excludes Latinos from the racial categories and assigns them to a separate category. Hispanics/Latinos may be of any race.
Race / Ethnicity (NH = Non-Hispanic)	Pop 2000	Pop 2010	Pop 2020	% 2000	% 2010	% 2020
White alone (NH)	1,318	824	752	88.75%	87.57%	80.43%
Black or African American alone (NH)	2	5	1	0.13%	0.53%	0.11%
Native American or Alaska Native alone (NH)	10	14	12	0.67%	1.49%	1.28%
Asian alone (NH)	4	3	12	0.27%	0.32%	1.28%
Native Hawaiian or Pacific Islander alone (NH)	2	0	6	0.13%	0.00%	0.64%
Other race alone (NH)	0	0	7	0.00%	0.00%	0.75%
Mixed race or Multiracial (NH)	55	24	51	3.70%	2.55%	5.45%
Hispanic or Latino (any race)	94	71	94	6.33%	7.55%	10.05%
Total	1,485	941	935	100.00%	100.00%	100.00%

=== 2020 ===
The 2020 United States census reported that Mi-Wuk Village had a population of 935. The population density was 329.8 inhabitants per square mile (127.3/km^{2}). The racial makeup of Mi-Wuk Village was 774 (82.8%) White, 4 (0.4%) African American, 19 (2.0%) Native American, 12 (1.3%) Asian, 7 (0.7%) Pacific Islander, 26 (2.8%) from other races, and 93 (9.9%) from two or more races. Hispanic or Latino of any race were 94 persons (10.1%).

The whole population lived in households. There were 460 households, out of which 84 (18.3%) had children under the age of 18 living in them, 204 (44.3%) were married-couple households, 42 (9.1%) were cohabiting couple households, 101 (22.0%) had a female householder with no partner present, and 113 (24.6%) had a male householder with no partner present. 151 households (32.8%) were one person, and 74 (16.1%) were one person aged 65 or older. The average household size was 2.03. There were 261 families (56.7% of all households).

The age distribution was 125 people (13.4%) under the age of 18, 39 people (4.2%) aged 18 to 24, 183 people (19.6%) aged 25 to 44, 308 people (32.9%) aged 45 to 64, and 280 people (29.9%) who were 65 years of age or older. The median age was 55.3 years. For every 100 females, there were 105.9 males.

There were 1,173 housing units at an average density of 413.8 units per square mile (159.8 units/km^{2}), of which 460 (39.2%) were occupied. Of these, 343 (74.6%) were owner-occupied, and 117 (25.4%) were occupied by renters.

=== 2010 ===
The 2010 United States census reported that Mi-Wuk Village had a population of 941. The population density was 338.0 inhabitants per square mile (130.5/km^{2}). The racial makeup of Mi-Wuk Village was 871 (92.6%) White, 5 (0.5%) African American, 17 (1.8%) Native American, 3 (0.3%) Asian, 0 (0.0%) Pacific Islander, 11 (1.2%) from other races, and 34 (3.6%) from two or more races. Hispanic or Latino of any race were 71 persons (7.5%).

The Census reported that 941 people (100% of the population) lived in households, 0 (0%) lived in non-institutionalized group quarters, and 0 (0%) were institutionalized.

There were 417 households, out of which 96 (23.0%) had children under the age of 18 living in them, 221 (53.0%) were opposite-sex married couples living together, 38 (9.1%) had a female householder with no husband present, 20 (4.8%) had a male householder with no wife present. There were 26 (6.2%) unmarried opposite-sex partnerships, and 6 (1.4%) same-sex married couples or partnerships. 100 households (24.0%) were made up of individuals, and 47 (11.3%) had someone living alone who was 65 years of age or older. The average household size was 2.26. There were 279 families (66.9% of all households); the average family size was 2.68.

The population was spread out, with 160 people (17.0%) under the age of 18, 61 people (6.5%) aged 18 to 24, 175 people (18.6%) aged 25 to 44, 343 people (36.5%) aged 45 to 64, and 202 people (21.5%) who were 65 years of age or older. The median age was 50.9 years. For every 100 females, there were 104.1 males. For every 100 females age 18 and over, there were 97.2 males.

There were 1,159 housing units at an average density of 416.3 per square mile (160.7/km^{2}), of which 321 (77.0%) were owner-occupied, and 96 (23.0%) were occupied by renters. The homeowner vacancy rate was 4.7%; the rental vacancy rate was 11.5%. 706 people (75.0% of the population) lived in owner-occupied housing units and 235 people (25.0%) lived in rental housing units.

=== 2000 ===
As of the census of 2000, the median income for a household in the CDP was $51,925, and the median income for a family was $52,019. Males had a median income of $43,750 versus $26,071 for females. The per capita income for the CDP was $26,209. About 5.9% of families and 8.8% of the population were below the poverty line, including 9.9% of those under age 18 and none of those age 65 or over.

== Government ==
In the California State Legislature, Mi-Wuk Village is in the 4th senatorial district, represented by Republican Marie Alvarado-Gil, and the 8th Assembly district, represented by Republican David Tangipa.

In the United States House of Representatives, Mi-Wuk Village is in California's 5th congressional district, represented by Republican Tom McClintock.

== See also ==
- Tuolumne Band of Me-Wuk Indians, Native Americans whose reservation is about 8 miles (13 km) to the southwest
