= East Sonora, California =

East Sonora
- Census-designated place
- Location in Tuolumne County and the state of California

- Location in the United States
- Coordinates: 37°58′39″N 120°20′28″W
- Country: United States
- State: California
- County: Tuolumne

Area
  - Total: 2.451 sq mi (6.348 km^{2})
  - Land: 2.446 sq mi (6.335 km^{2})
  - Water: 0.0050 sq mi (0.013 km^{2}) 0.21%
- Elevation: 2,113 ft (644 m)

Population (2020)
  - Total: 2,431
  - Density: 993.9/sq mi (383.7/km^{2})
- Time zone: UTC-8 (Pacific (PST))
  - Summer (DST): UTC-7 (PDT)
- ZIP code: 95370
- Area code: 209
- FIPS code: 06-21188
- GNIS feature ID: 2408039

East Sonora is a census-designated place (CDP) in Tuolumne County, California, United States. The population was 2,431 at the 2020 census, up from 2,266 at the 2010 census.

== Geography ==
According to the United States Census Bureau, the CDP has a total area of 2.5 square miles (6.5 km^{2}), 99.79% of it land and 0.21% of it water.

== Demographics ==
Historical population
Census	Pop.	Note	%±
1990	1,675		—
2000	2,078		24.1%
2010	2,266		9.0%
2020	2,431		7.3%
U.S. Decennial Census; 1850–1870 1880-1890; 1900 1910 1920; 1930 1940 1950; 1960 1970 1980; 1990 2000 2010

East Sonora first appeared as a census designated place in the 1990 U.S. census.

=== Racial and ethnic composition ===
East Sonora CDP, California – Racial and ethnic composition Note: the US Census treats Hispanic/Latino as an ethnic category. This table excludes Latinos from the racial categories and assigns them to a separate category. Hispanics/Latinos may be of any race.
Race / Ethnicity (NH = Non-Hispanic)	Pop 2000	Pop 2010	Pop 2020	% 2000	% 2010	% 2020
White alone (NH)	1,875	2,027	1,992	90.23%	89.45%	81.94%
Black or African American alone (NH)	17	7	13	0.82%	0.31%	0.53%
Native American or Alaska Native alone (NH)	7	14	11	0.34%	0.62%	0.45%
Asian alone (NH)	13	29	59	0.63%	1.28%	2.43%
Native Hawaiian or Pacific Islander alone (NH)	1	1	1	0.05%	0.04%	0.04%
Other race alone (NH)	0	2	8	0.00%	0.09%	0.33%
Mixed race or Multiracial (NH)	38	34	116	1.83%	1.50%	4.77%
Hispanic or Latino (any race)	127	152	231	6.11%	6.71%	9.50%
Total	2,078	2,266	2,431	100.00%	100.00%	100.00%

=== 2020 census ===
As of the 2020 census, East Sonora had a population of 2,431. The population density was 993.9 inhabitants per square mile (383.7/km^{2}). The median age was 62.3 years. The age distribution was 12.5% under the age of 18, 4.9% aged 18 to 24, 15.4% aged 25 to 44, 21.6% aged 45 to 64, and 45.6% who were 65 years of age or older. For every 100 females, there were 76.5 males, and for every 100 females age 18 and over there were 70.4 males.

The census reported that 93.5% of the population lived in households, 0.5% lived in non-institutionalized group quarters, and 6.0% were institutionalized. 93.4% of residents lived in urban areas, while 6.6% lived in rural areas.

There were 1,200 households, of which 14.3% included children under the age of 18. Of all households, 34.4% were married-couple households, 5.8% were cohabiting couple households, 40.5% had a female householder with no partner present, and 19.3% had a male householder with no partner present. 46.4% of households were one person, and 35.2% were one person aged 65 or older. The average household size was 1.89. There were 555 families (46.2% of all households).

There were 1,287 housing units at an average density of 526.2 units per square mile (203.2 units/km^{2}), of which 1,200 (93.2%) were occupied. Of these, 59.3% were owner-occupied, and 40.7% were occupied by renters. 6.8% of housing units were vacant. The homeowner vacancy rate was 3.0% and the rental vacancy rate was 3.5%.

Racial composition as of the 2020 census
Race	Number	Percent
White	2,066	85.0%
Black or African American	16	0.7%
American Indian and Alaska Native	24	1.0%
Asian	61	2.5%
Native Hawaiian and Other Pacific Islander	1	0.0%
Some other race	54	2.2%
Two or more races	209	8.6%

=== Income and poverty ===
In 2023, the US Census Bureau estimated that the median household income was $85,461, and the per capita income was $53,859. About 6.2% of families and 7.5% of the population were below the poverty line.

=== 2010 census ===
At the 2010 census East Sonora had a population of 2,266. The population density was 913.4 inhabitants per square mile (352.7/km^{2}). The racial makeup of East Sonora was 2,129 (94.0%) White, 7 (0.3%) African American, 16 (0.7%) Native American, 32 (1.4%) Asian, 1 (0.0%) Pacific Islander, 35 (1.5%) from other races, and 46 (2.0%) from two or more races. Hispanic or Latino of any race were 152 people (6.7%).

The census reported that 2,151 people (94.9% of the population) lived in households, 1 (0%) lived in non-institutionalized group quarters, and 114 (5.0%) were institutionalized.

There were 1,150 households, 167 (14.5%) had children under the age of 18 living in them, 422 (36.7%) were opposite-sex married couples living together, 80 (7.0%) had a female householder with no husband present, 26 (2.3%) had a male householder with no wife present. There were 63 (5.5%) unmarried opposite-sex partnerships, and 9 (0.8%) same-sex married couples or partnerships. 544 households (47.3%) were one person and 393 (34.2%) had someone living alone who was 65 or older. The average household size was 1.87. There were 528 families (45.9% of households); the average family size was 2.62.

The age distribution was 288 people (12.7%) under the age of 18, 128 people (5.6%) aged 18 to 24, 314 people (13.9%) aged 25 to 44, 557 people (24.6%) aged 45 to 64, and 979 people (43.2%) who were 65 or older. The median age was 60.4 years. For every 100 females, there were 74.7 males. For every 100 females age 18 and over, there were 69.9 males.

There were 1,279 housing units at an average density of 515.6 per square mile, of the occupied units 694 (60.3%) were owner-occupied and 456 (39.7%) were rented. The homeowner vacancy rate was 5.3%; the rental vacancy rate was 11.1%. 1,338 people (59.0% of the population) lived in owner-occupied housing units and 813 people (35.9%) lived in rental housing units.
