= Cold Springs, Tuolumne County, California =

Cold Springs
- Census-designated place
- Position in California.
- Coordinates: 38°09′33″N 120°03′08″W
- Country: United States
- State: California
- County: Tuolumne

Area
  - Total: 1.734 sq mi (4.492 km^{2})
  - Land: 1.734 sq mi (4.492 km^{2})
  - Water: 0 sq mi (0 km^{2})
- Elevation: 5,315 ft (1,620 m)

Population (2020)
  - Total: 123
  - Density: 70.9/sq mi (27.4/km^{2})
- Time zone: UTC-8 (Pacific (PST))
  - Summer (DST): UTC-7 (PDT)
- GNIS feature ID: 2628721

Cold Springs is a census-designated place (CDP) in Tuolumne County, California, United States. Cold Springs sits at an elevation of 5,315 feet (1,620 m). The 2020 United States census reported Cold Springs's population was 123.

== Geography ==
According to the United States Census Bureau, the CDP covers an area of 1.7 square miles (4.5 km^{2}), all land.

== Demographics ==
Historical population
Census	Pop.	Note	%±
2010	181		—
2020	123		−32.0%
U.S. Decennial Census; 1850–1870 1880-1890; 1900 1910 1920; 1930 1940 1950; 1960 1970 1980; 1990 2000 2010

Cold Springs first appeared as a census designated place in the 2010 U.S. census.

The 2020 United States census reported that Cold Springs had a population of 123. The population density was 70.9 inhabitants per square mile (27.4/km^{2}). The racial makeup of Cold Springs was 110 (89.4%) White, 0 (0.0%) African American, 0 (0.0%) Native American, 2 (1.6%) Asian, 0 (0.0%) Pacific Islander, 1 (0.8%) from other races, and 10 (8.1%) from two or more races. Hispanic or Latino of any race were 7 persons (5.7%).

The whole population lived in households. There were 68 households, out of which 7 (10.3%) had children under the age of 18 living in them, 28 (41.2%) were married-couple households, 7 (10.3%) were cohabiting couple households, 12 (17.6%) had a female householder with no partner present, and 21 (30.9%) had a male householder with no partner present. 29 households (42.6%) were one person, and 19 (27.9%) were one person aged 65 or older. The average household size was 1.81. There were 33 families (48.5% of all households).

The age distribution was 10 people (8.1%) under the age of 18, 2 people (1.6%) aged 18 to 24, 20 people (16.3%) aged 25 to 44, 41 people (33.3%) aged 45 to 64, and 50 people (40.7%) who were 65 years of age or older. The median age was 62.7 years. There were 69 males and 54 females.

There were 426 housing units at an average density of 245.7 units per square mile (94.9 units/km^{2}), of which 68 (16.0%) were occupied. Of these, 53 (77.9%) were owner-occupied, and 15 (22.1%) were occupied by renters.

== Economy ==
Jenness Park, a Christian summer camp, is located outside of Cold Springs.
