= Sierra Village, California =

Sierra Village
- census-designated place
- Position in California.
- Coordinates: 38°04′32″N 120°09′34″W
- Country: United States
- State: California
- County: Tuolumne

Area
  - Total: 2.576 sq mi (6.671 km^{2})
  - Land: 2.572 sq mi (6.662 km^{2})
  - Water: 0.0039 sq mi (0.010 km^{2}) 0.15%
- Elevation: 4,787 ft (1,459 m)

Population (2020)
  - Total: 411
  - Density: 160/sq mi (61.7/km^{2})
- Time zone: UTC-8 (Pacific (PST))
  - Summer (DST): UTC-7 (PDT)
- GNIS feature ID: 2583140

Sierra Village is a census-designated place (CDP) in Tuolumne County, California, United States. It is located roughly 1½ miles northeast of Mi-Wuk Village on State Route 108. Sierra Village sits at an elevation of 4,787 feet (1,459 m). The 2020 United States census reported Sierra Village's population was 411.

== Geography ==
According to the United States Census Bureau, the CDP covers an area of 2.6 square miles (6.7 km^{2}), of which 99.85% is land and 0.15% is water.

== Demographics ==
Historical population
Census	Pop.	Note	%±
2010	456		—
2020	411		−9.9%
U.S. Decennial Census; 1850–1870 1880-1890; 1900 1910 1920; 1930 1940 1950; 1960 1970 1980; 1990 2000 2010

Sierra Village first appeared as a census designated place in the 2010 U.S. census formed from part of the Mi-Wuk Village CDP and additional area.

=== Racial and ethnic composition ===
Sierra Village CDP, California – Racial and ethnic composition Note: the US Census treats Hispanic/Latino as an ethnic category. This table excludes Latinos from the racial categories and assigns them to a separate category. Hispanics/Latinos may be of any race.
Race / Ethnicity (NH = Non-Hispanic)	Pop 2010	Pop 2020	% 2010	% 2020
White alone (NH)	399	344	87.50%	83.70%
Black or African American alone (NH)	1	0	0.22%	0.00%
Native American or Alaska Native alone (NH)	7	4	1.54%	0.97%
Asian alone (NH)	3	9	0.66%	2.19%
Native Hawaiian or Pacific Islander alone (NH)	1	0	0.22%	0.00%
Other race alone (NH)	0	2	0.00%	0.49%
Mixed race or Multiracial (NH)	9	25	1.97%	6.08%
Hispanic or Latino (any race)	36	27	7.89%	6.57%
Total	456	411	100.00%	100.00%

=== 2020 census ===
The 2020 United States census reported that Sierra Village had a population of 411. The population density was 159.8 inhabitants per square mile (61.7/km^{2}). The racial makeup of Sierra Village was 347 (84.4%) White, 0 (0.0%) African American, 6 (1.5%) Native American, 11 (2.7%) Asian, 1 (0.2%) Pacific Islander, 5 (1.2%) from other races, and 41 (10.0%) from two or more races. Hispanic or Latino of any race were 27 persons (6.6%).

The whole population lived in households. There were 194 households, out of which 44 (22.7%) had children under the age of 18 living in them, 82 (42.3%) were married-couple households, 6 (3.1%) were cohabiting couple households, 52 (26.8%) had a female householder with no partner present, and 54 (27.8%) had a male householder with no partner present. 59 households (30.4%) were one person, and 27 (13.9%) were one person aged 65 or older. The average household size was 2.12. There were 121 families (62.4% of all households).

The age distribution was 68 people (16.5%) under the age of 18, 41 people (10.0%) aged 18 to 24, 91 people (22.1%) aged 25 to 44, 94 people (22.9%) aged 45 to 64, and 117 people (28.5%) who were 65 years of age or older. The median age was 48.4 years. For every 100 females, there were 144.6 males.

There were 553 housing units at an average density of 215.0 units per square mile (83.0 units/km^{2}), of which 194 (35.1%) were occupied. Of these, 134 (69.1%) were owner-occupied, and 60 (30.9%) were occupied by renters.
