= Cedar Ridge, Tuolumne County, California =

Cedar Ridge
- Census-designated place
- Position in California.
- Coordinates: 38°03′57″N 120°16′26″W
- Country: United States
- State: California
- County: Tuolumne

Area
  - Total: 7.817 sq mi (20.246 km^{2})
  - Land: 7.808 sq mi (20.223 km^{2})
  - Water: 0.0085 sq mi (0.022 km^{2}) 0.11%
- Elevation: 3,760 ft (1,150 m)

Population (2020)
  - Total: 1,235
  - Density: 158.2/sq mi (61.07/km^{2})
- Time zone: UTC-8 (Pacific (PST))
  - Summer (DST): UTC-7 (PDT)
- GNIS feature ID: 2582970

Cedar Ridge is a census-designated place (CDP) in Tuolumne County, California, United States. Cedar Ridge sits at an elevation of 3,760 feet (1,150 m). The 2020 United States census reported Cedar Ridge's population as 1,235.

Cedar Ridge was created a CDP for the 2010 census, previously it was part of the Phoenix Lake-Cedar Ridge CDP.

== Geography ==
According to the United States Census Bureau, the CDP covers an area of 7.8 square miles (20.2 km^{2}), of which 99.89% is land and 0.11% is water.

== Demographics ==
Historical population
Census	Pop.	Note	%±
2010	1,132		—
2020	1,235		9.1%
U.S. Decennial Census; 1850–1870 1880-1890; 1900 1910 1920; 1930 1940 1950; 1960 1970 1980; 1990 2000 2010

Cedar Ridge first appeared as a census designated place in the 2010 U.S. census formed from part of deleted Phoenix Lake-Cedar Ridge CDP and additional area.

=== Racial and ethnic composition ===
Cedar Ridge CDP, California – Racial and ethnic composition Note: the US Census treats Hispanic/Latino as an ethnic category. This table excludes Latinos from the racial categories and assigns them to a separate category. Hispanics/Latinos may be of any race.
Race / Ethnicity (NH = Non-Hispanic)	Pop 2010	Pop 2020	% 2010	% 2020
White alone (NH)	1,018	1,022	89.93%	82.75%
Black or African American alone (NH)	3	1	0.27%	0.08%
Native American or Alaska Native alone (NH)	5	13	0.44%	1.05%
Asian alone (NH)	4	10	0.35%	0.81%
Native Hawaiian or Pacific Islander alone (NH)	1	1	0.09%	0.08%
Other race alone (NH)	0	5	0.00%	0.40%
Mixed race or Multiracial (NH)	30	67	2.65%	5.43%
Hispanic or Latino (any race)	71	116	6.27%	9.39%
Total	1,132	1,235	100.00%	100.00%

=== 2020 census ===
The 2020 United States census reported that Cedar Ridge had a population of 1,235. The population density was 158.2 inhabitants per square mile (61.1/km^{2}). The racial makeup of Cedar Ridge was 1,059 (85.7%) White, 1 (0.1%) African American, 18 (1.5%) Native American, 11 (0.9%) Asian, 1 (0.1%) Pacific Islander, 34 (2.8%) from other races, and 111 (9.0%) from two or more races. Hispanic or Latino of any race were 116 persons (9.4%).

The whole population lived in households. There were 512 households, out of which 121 (23.6%) had children under the age of 18 living in them, 277 (54.1%) were married-couple households, 40 (7.8%) were cohabiting couple households, 81 (15.8%) had a female householder with no partner present, and 114 (22.3%) had a male householder with no partner present. 122 households (23.8%) were one person, and 67 (13.1%) were one person aged 65 or older. The average household size was 2.41. There were 359 families (70.1% of all households).

The age distribution was 216 people (17.5%) under the age of 18, 81 people (6.6%) aged 18 to 24, 251 people (20.3%) aged 25 to 44, 346 people (28.0%) aged 45 to 64, and 341 people (27.6%) who were 65 years of age or older. The median age was 50.7 years. For every 100 females, there were 104.1 males.

There were 780 housing units at an average density of 99.9 units per square mile (38.6 units/km^{2}), of which 512 (65.6%) were occupied. Of these, 450 (87.9%) were owner-occupied, and 62 (12.1%) were occupied by renters.
