= Mono Vista, California =

Mono Vista
- census-designated place
- Location in Tuolumne County and the state of California

- Location in the United States
- Coordinates: 38°00′24″N 120°16′22″W
- Country: United States
- State: California
- County: Tuolumne

Area
  - Total: 2.829 sq mi (7.327 km^{2})
  - Land: 2.826 sq mi (7.319 km^{2})
  - Water: 0.0027 sq mi (0.007 km^{2}) 0.10%
- Elevation: 2,736 ft (834 m)

Population (2020)
  - Total: 3,236
  - Density: 1,145/sq mi (442.1/km^{2})
- Time zone: UTC-8 (Pacific (PST))
  - Summer (DST): UTC-7 (PDT)
- ZIP code: 95370
- Area code: 209
- FIPS code: 06-48641
- GNIS feature ID: 2408856

Mono Vista is a census-designated place (CDP) in Tuolumne County, California, United States. The population was 3,236 at the 2020 census, up from 3,127 at the 2010 census.

== Geography ==
According to the United States Census Bureau, the CDP has a total area of 2.8 square miles (7.3 km^{2}), 99.90% of it land and 0.10% of it water.

== Demographics ==
Historical population
Census	Pop.	Note	%±
1980	1,154		—
1990	2,599		125.2%
2000	3,072		18.2%
2010	3,127		1.8%
2020	3,236		3.5%
U.S. Decennial Census; 1860–1870 1880-1890; 1900 1910 1920; 1930 1940 1950; 1960 1970 1980; 1990 2000 2010

Mono Vista first appeared as a census designated place in the 1980 United States census.

=== Racial and ethnic composition ===
Mono Vista CDP, California – Racial and ethnic composition Note: the US Census treats Hispanic/Latino as an ethnic category. This table excludes Latinos from the racial categories and assigns them to a separate category. Hispanics/Latinos may be of any race.
Race / Ethnicity (NH = Non-Hispanic)	Pop 2000	Pop 2010	Pop 2020	% 2000	% 2010	% 2020
White alone (NH)	2,727	2,639	2,406	88.77%	84.39%	74.35%
Black or African American alone (NH)	12	4	14	0.39%	0.13%	0.43%
Native American or Alaska Native alone (NH)	23	45	37	0.75%	1.44%	1.14%
Asian alone (NH)	12	33	30	0.39%	1.06%	0.93%
Native Hawaiian or Pacific Islander alone (NH)	3	6	10	0.10%	0.19%	0.31%
Other race alone (NH)	3	1	22	0.10%	0.03%	0.68%
Mixed race or Multiracial (NH)	63	99	243	2.05%	3.17%	7.51%
Hispanic or Latino (any race)	229	300	474	7.45%	9.59%	14.65%
Total	3,072	3,127	3,236	100.00%	100.00%	100.00%

=== 2020 census ===
As of the 2020 census, Mono Vista had a population of 3,236. The population density was 1,145.1 inhabitants per square mile (442.1/km^{2}). The median age was 42.1 years. 22.1% of residents were under the age of 18 and 21.6% were 65 years of age or older. For every 100 females there were 101.2 males, and for every 100 females age 18 and over there were 102.1 males age 18 and over.

The age distribution was 7.0% aged 18 to 24, 23.6% aged 25 to 44, and 25.7% aged 45 to 64. 98.7% of residents lived in urban areas, while 1.3% lived in rural areas.

The census reported that 99.5% of the population lived in households, 0.2% lived in non-institutionalized group quarters, and 0.3% were institutionalized. There were 1,249 households, out of which 28.4% included children under the age of 18. Of all households, 53.3% were married-couple households, 6.6% were cohabiting couple households, 20.2% were households with a male householder and no spouse or partner present, and 19.9% were households with a female householder and no spouse or partner present. About 23.4% of all households were made up of individuals and 13.2% had someone living alone who was 65 years of age or older. The average household size was 2.58. There were 878 families (70.3% of all households).

There were 1,447 housing units at an average density of 512.0 units per square mile (197.7 units/km^{2}), of which 1,249 (86.3%) were occupied. Of occupied units, 83.3% were owner-occupied and 16.7% were occupied by renters. Of all housing units, 13.7% were vacant. The homeowner vacancy rate was 3.2% and the rental vacancy rate was 1.9%.

Racial composition as of the 2020 census
Race	Number	Percent
White	2,541	78.5%
Black or African American	16	0.5%
American Indian and Alaska Native	53	1.6%
Asian	35	1.1%
Native Hawaiian and Other Pacific Islander	13	0.4%
Some other race	133	4.1%
Two or more races	445	13.8%

=== Income and poverty ===
In 2023, the US Census Bureau estimated that the median household income was $70,353, and the per capita income was $43,583. About 4.5% of families and 8.6% of the population were below the poverty line.

=== 2010 census ===
The 2010 United States census reported that Mono Vista had a population of 3,127. The population density was 1,101.6 inhabitants per square mile (425.3/km^{2}). The racial makeup of Mono Vista was 2,796 (89.4%) White, 6 (0.2%) African American, 58 (1.9%) Native American, 38 (1.2%) Asian, 8 (0.3%) Pacific Islander, 61 (2.0%) from other races, and 160 (5.1%) from two or more races. Hispanic or Latino of any race were 300 persons (9.6%).

The Census reported that 3,102 people (99.2% of the population) lived in households, 25 (0.8%) lived in non-institutionalized group quarters, and 0 (0%) were institutionalized.

There were 1,211 households, out of which 391 (32.3%) had children under the age of 18 living in them, 648 (53.5%) were opposite-sex married couples living together, 129 (10.7%) had a female householder with no husband present, 78 (6.4%) had a male householder with no wife present. There were 94 (7.8%) unmarried opposite-sex partnerships, and 4 (0.3%) same-sex married couples or partnerships. 272 households (22.5%) were made up of individuals, and 110 (9.1%) had someone living alone who was 65 years of age or older. The average household size was 2.56. There were 855 families (70.6% of all households); the average family size was 2.98.

The population was spread out, with 731 people (23.4%) under the age of 18, 276 people (8.8%) aged 18 to 24, 728 people (23.3%) aged 25 to 44, 908 people (29.0%) aged 45 to 64, and 484 people (15.5%) who were 65 years of age or older. The median age was 40.5 years. For every 100 females, there were 99.9 males. For every 100 females age 18 and over, there were 99.0 males.

There were 1,471 housing units at an average density of 518.2 per square mile (200.1/km^{2}), of which 898 (74.2%) were owner-occupied, and 313 (25.8%) were occupied by renters. The homeowner vacancy rate was 5.3%; the rental vacancy rate was 10.5%. 2,199 people (70.3% of the population) lived in owner-occupied housing units and 903 people (28.9%) lived in rental housing units.

== Government ==
In the California State Legislature, Mono Vista is in the 4th senatorial district, represented by Republican Marie Alvarado-Gil, and the 8th Assembly district, represented by Republican David Tangipa.

In the United States House of Representatives, Mono Vista is in California's 5th congressional district, represented by Republican Tom McClintock.
