= Tuolumne County, California =

County in California, United States

Coordinates: 38.02°N 119.94°W

Tuolumne County
- County
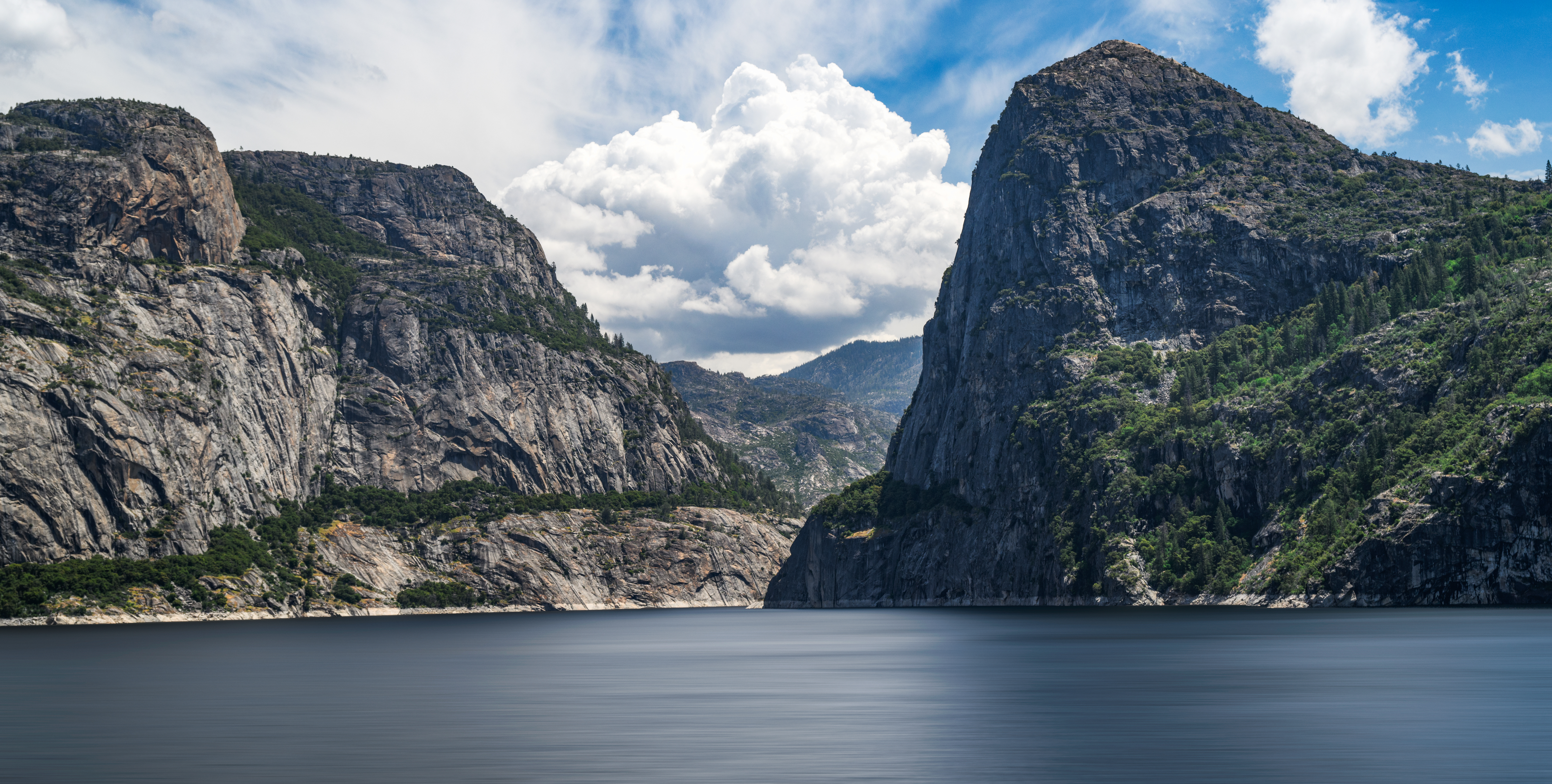
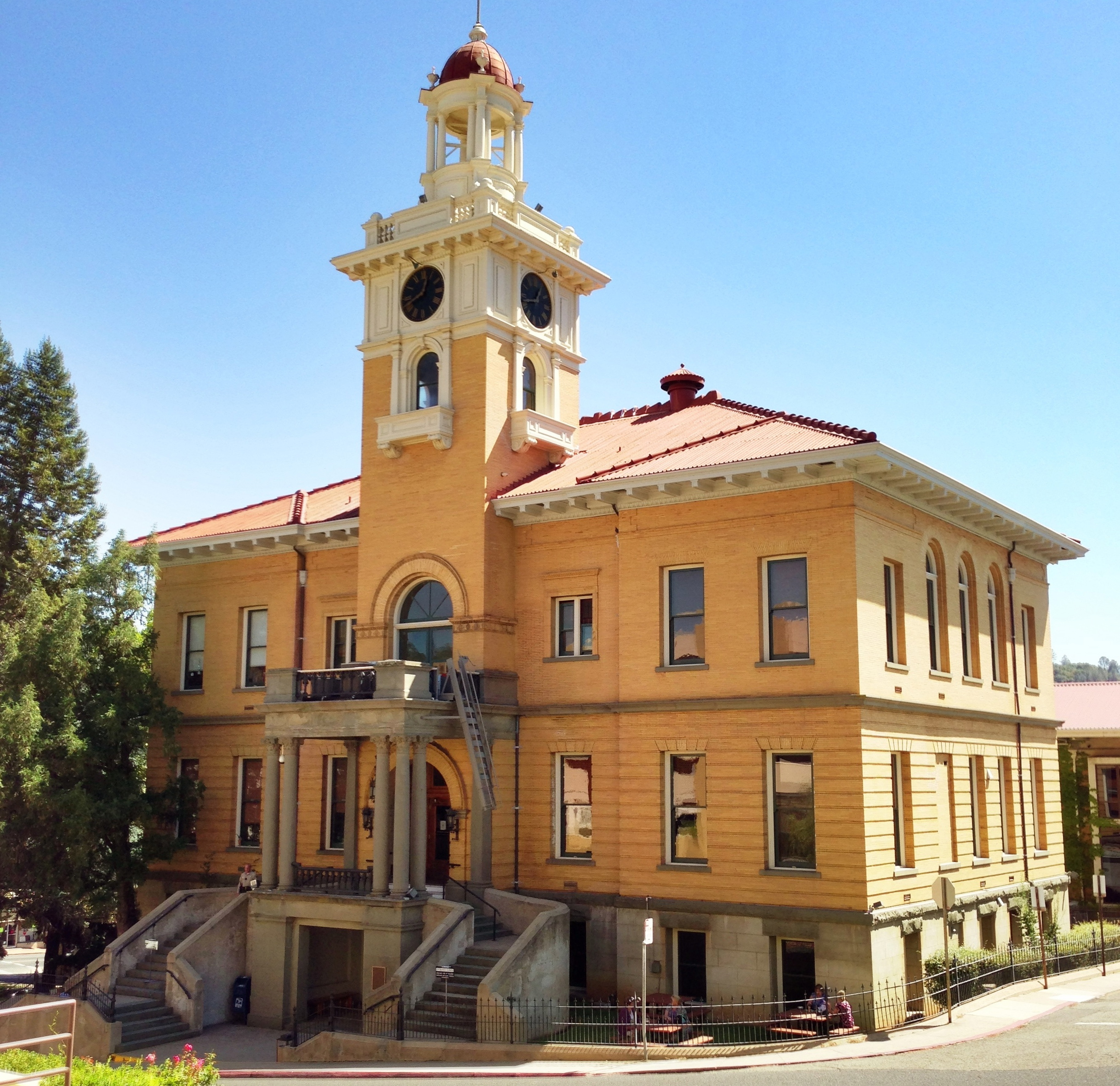
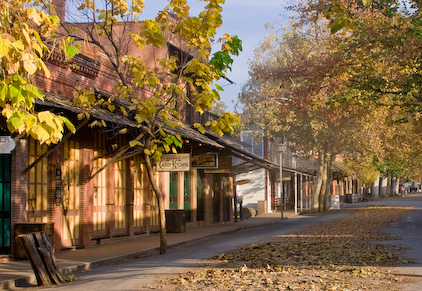
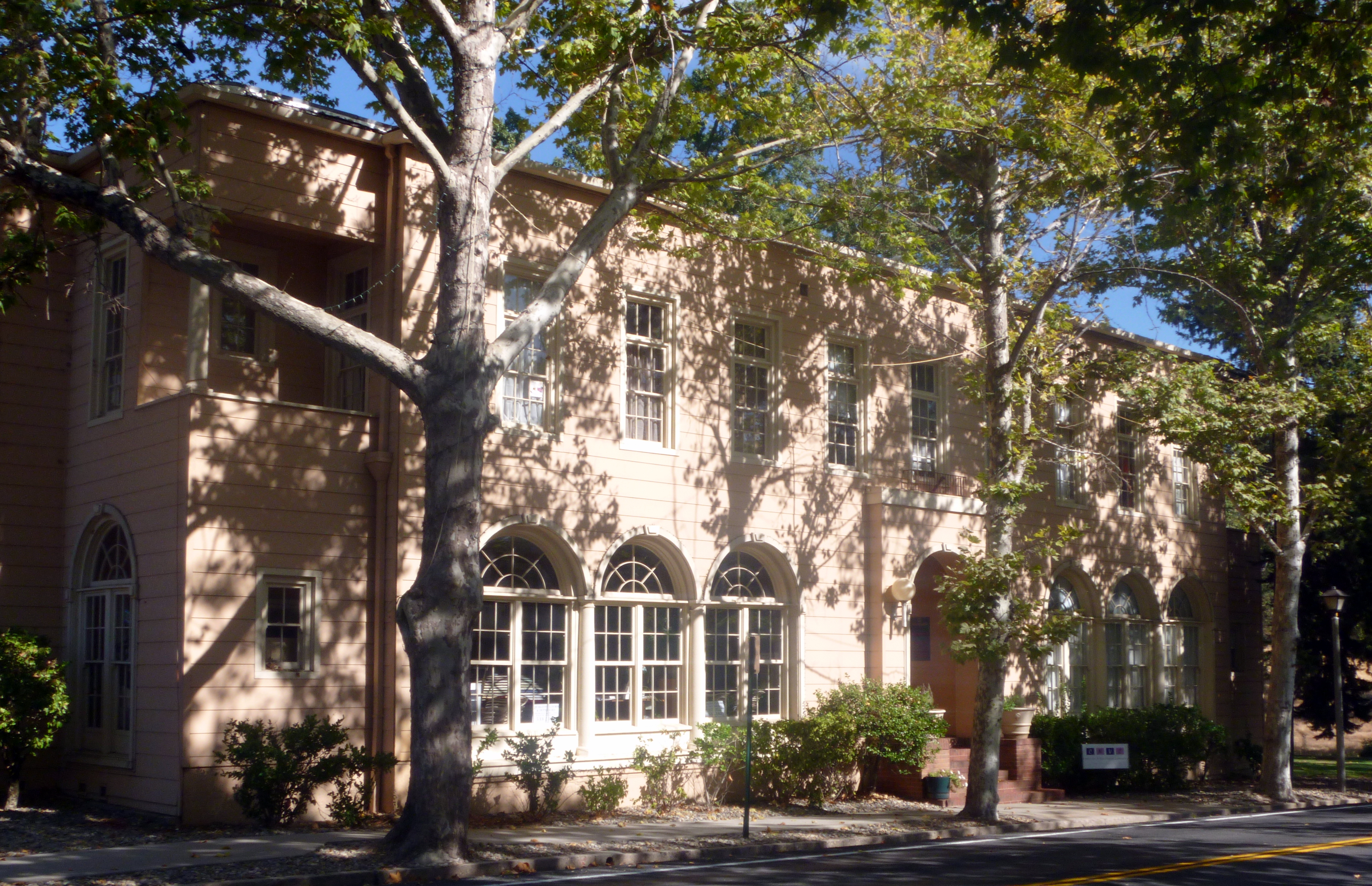
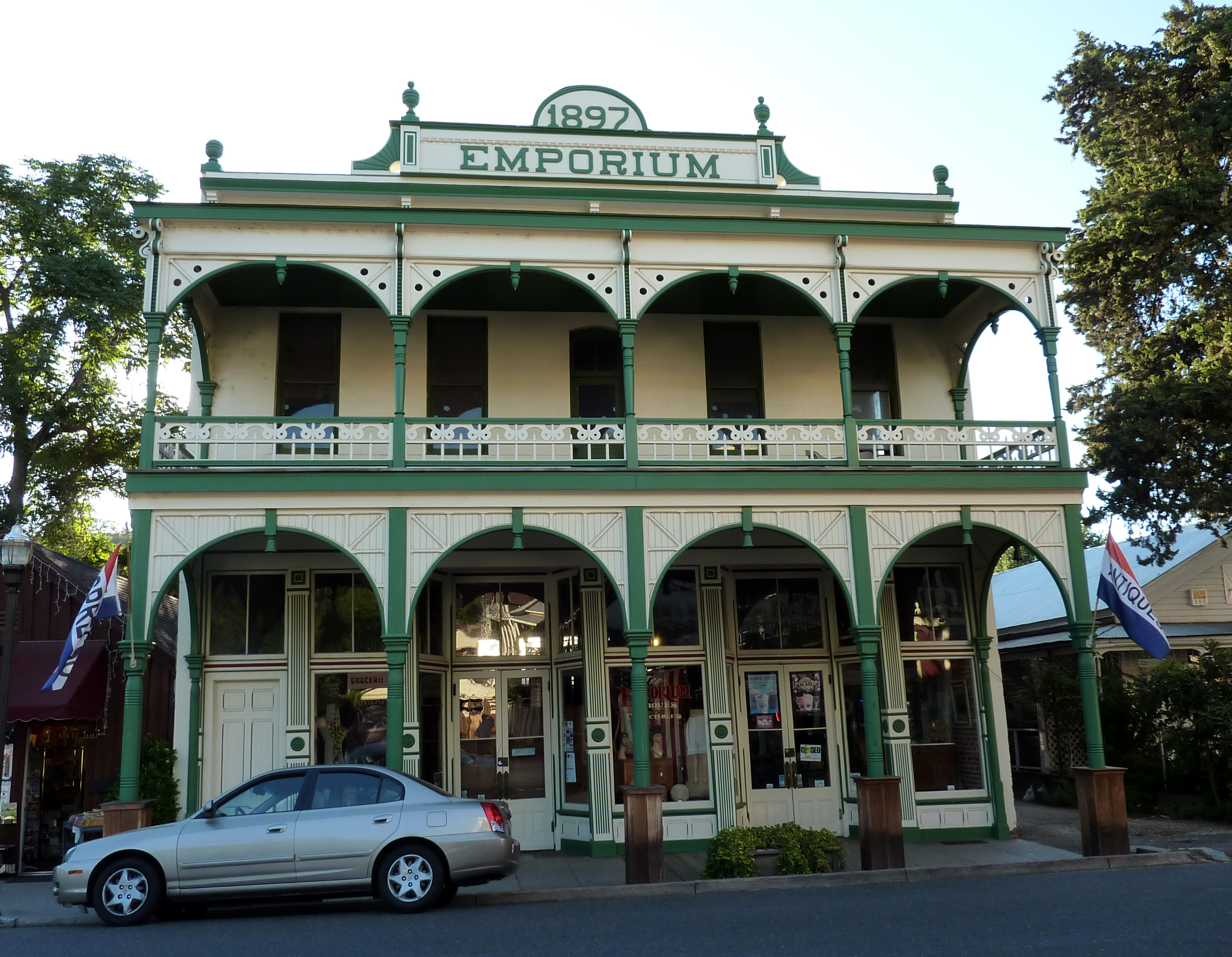
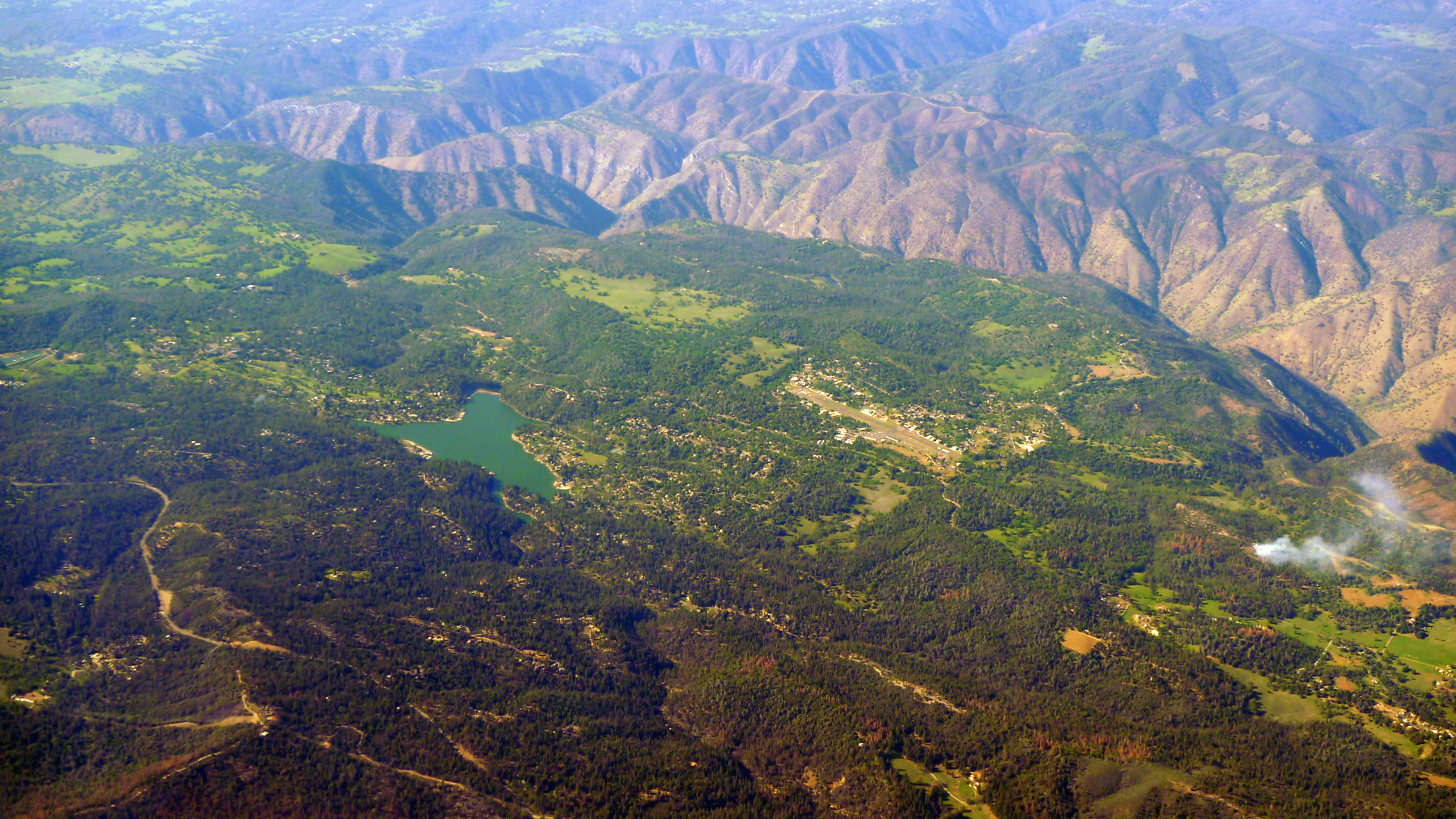
- Hetch Hetchy in Yosemite National Park Sonora Columbia Soulsbyville Jamestown Groveland and Stanislaus National Forest

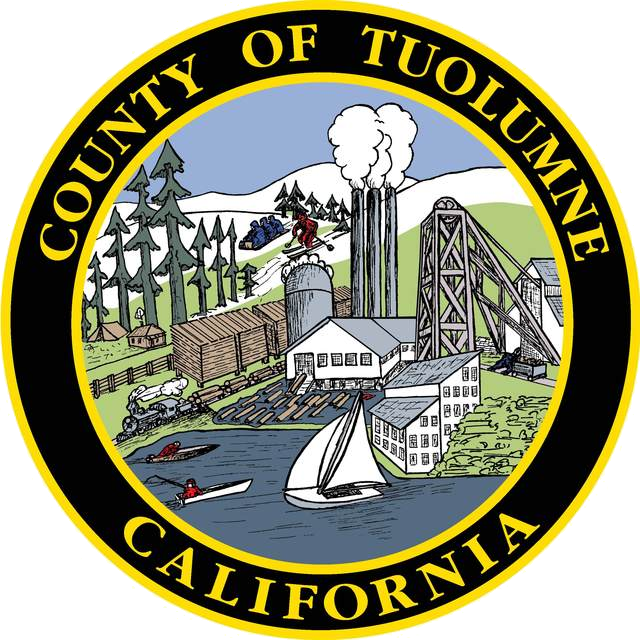
- Flag Seal
- Interactive map of Tuolumne County
- Location in the state of California
- Country: United States
- State: California
- Regions: Sierra Nevada, Gold Country
- Incorporated: February 15, 1850
- County seat: Sonora
- Largest city: Sonora

Government
  - Type: Council–Administrator
  - Body: Board of Supervisors
  - Chair: Stephen A. Griefer
  - Vice Chair: Mike Holland
  - Board of Supervisors: Supervisors: Michael Holland; Ryan Campbell; Daniel Anaiah Kirk; Stephen Griefer; Jaron Brandon
  - County Administrator: Tracie Riggs

Area
  - Total: 2,274 sq mi (5,890 km^{2})
  - Land: 2,221 sq mi (5,750 km^{2})
  - Water: 54 sq mi (140 km^{2})
- Highest elevation: 13,114 ft (3,997 m)

Population (April 1, 2020)
  - Total: 55,620
  - Estimate (2025): 53,160 ▼
  - Density: 25.04/sq mi (9.669/km^{2})

GDP
  - Total: $2.884 billion (2022)
- Time zone: UTC−8 (Pacific Time Zone)
  - Summer (DST): UTC−7 (Pacific Daylight Time)
- Congressional district: 5th
- Website: tuolumnecounty.ca.gov

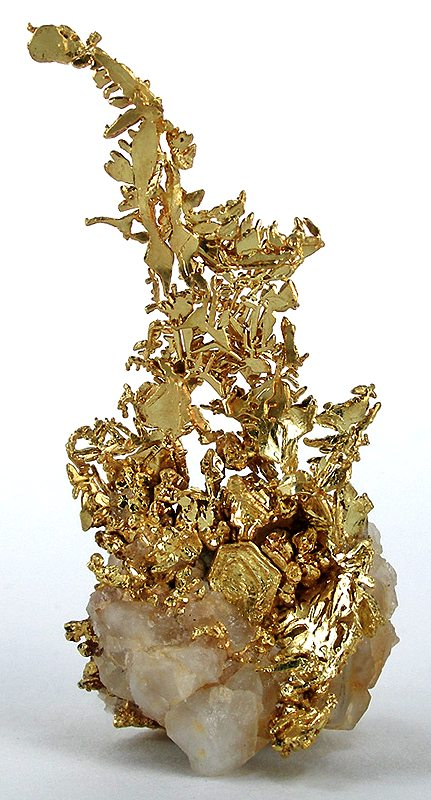
Very fine old crystalline-gold specimen, most likely from Tuolumne County. Sold in the 1950s for $65; more recently for $12,500. Published twice.

Tuolumne County (/tuˈɒləmi/), officially the County of Tuolumne, is a county located in the U.S. state of California. As of the 2020 census, the population was 55,620. The county seat and only incorporated city is Sonora.

Tuolumne County comprises the Sonora, CA Micropolitan Statistical Area. The county is in the Sierra Nevada region.

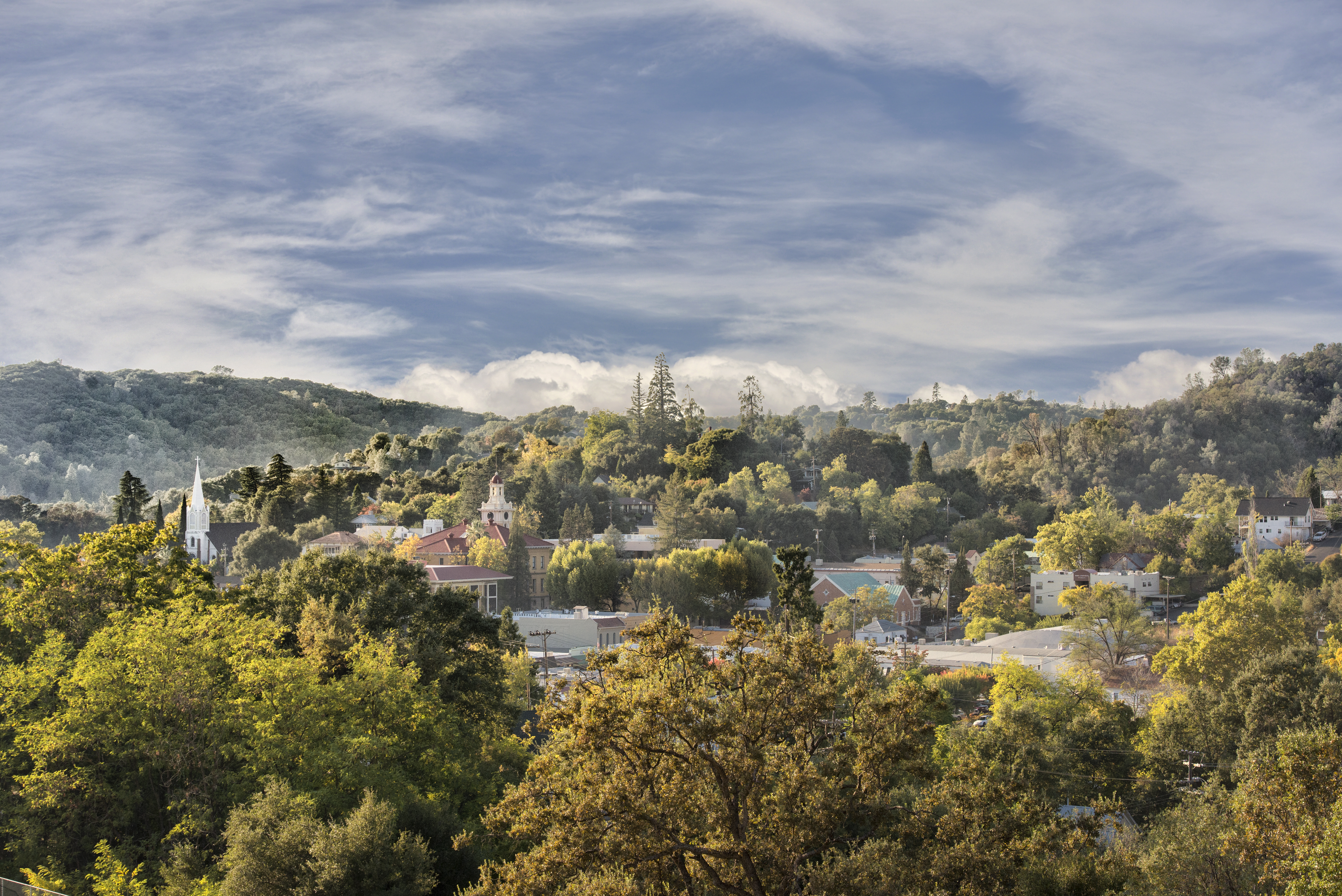
City of Sonora in Tuolumne County California

The northern half of Yosemite National Park is located in the eastern part of the county.

== Etymology ==
The name Tuolumne is of Native American origin and has been given different meanings, such as Many Stone Houses, The Land of Mountain Lions, and Straight Up Steep, the latter an interpretation of William Fuller, a native Chief. Mariano Vallejo, in his report to the first California State Legislature, said that the word is "a corruption of the Native American word talmalamne which signifies 'cluster of stone wigwams.'" The name may mean "people who dwell in stone houses," i.e., in caves.

== History ==
Tuolumne County Boundaries

One of California's original 27 counties, Tuolumne was organized in 1850.

Prior to the official naming of counties by the state, Tuolumne was sometimes referred to as Oro County.

The original lines of Tuolumne County were not long established. In 1854 and 1855 the portion of Tuolumne County that extended west into the San Joaquin Valley was reorganized as Stanislaus County. In 1864 a number of the original counties including Tuolumne contributed lands that would lead to the establishment of Alpine County to the northeast. With the State's Adoption of the Political Code in 1872 the current boundaries of Tuolumne County were largely established as shown in the maps below.

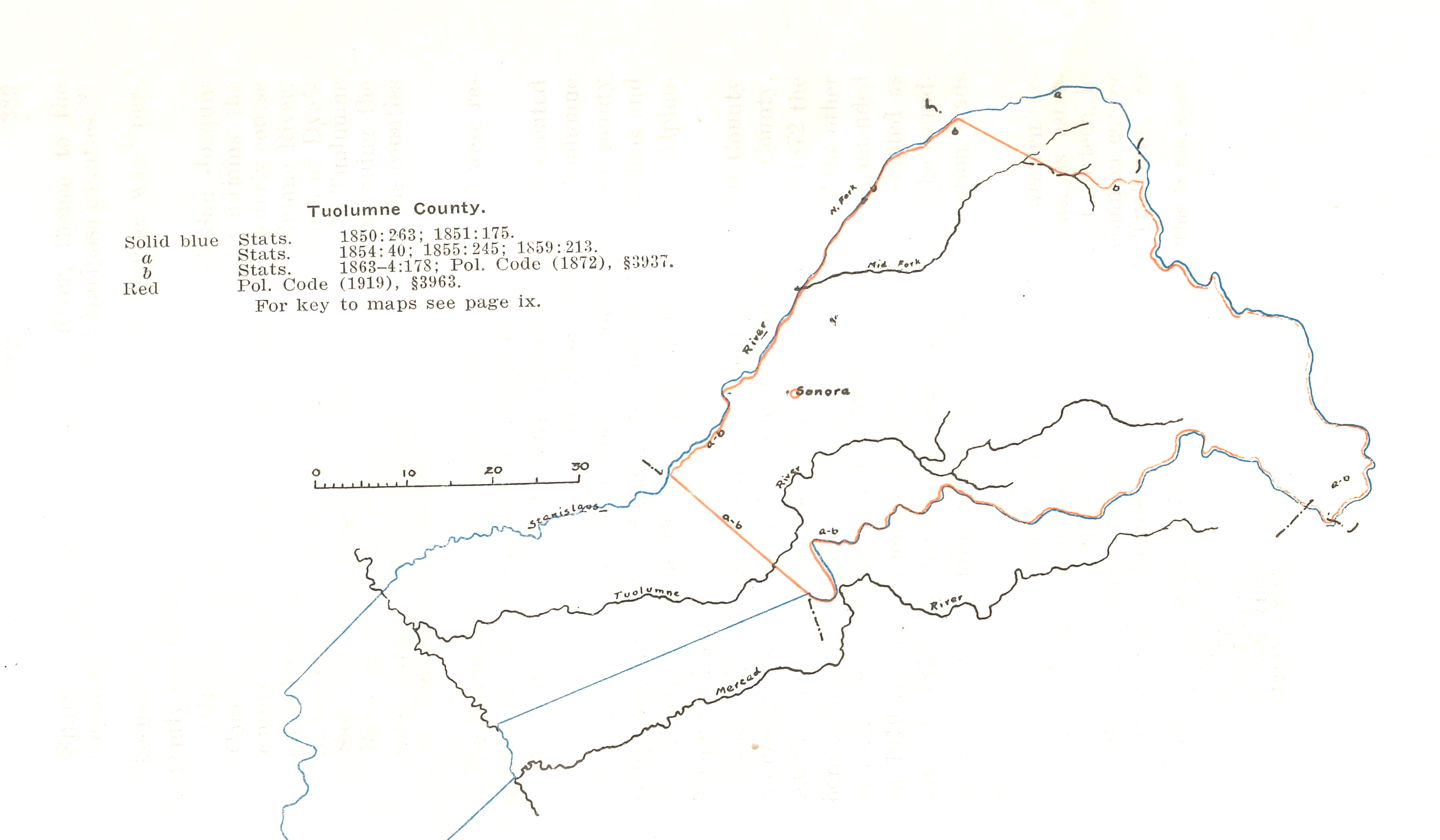

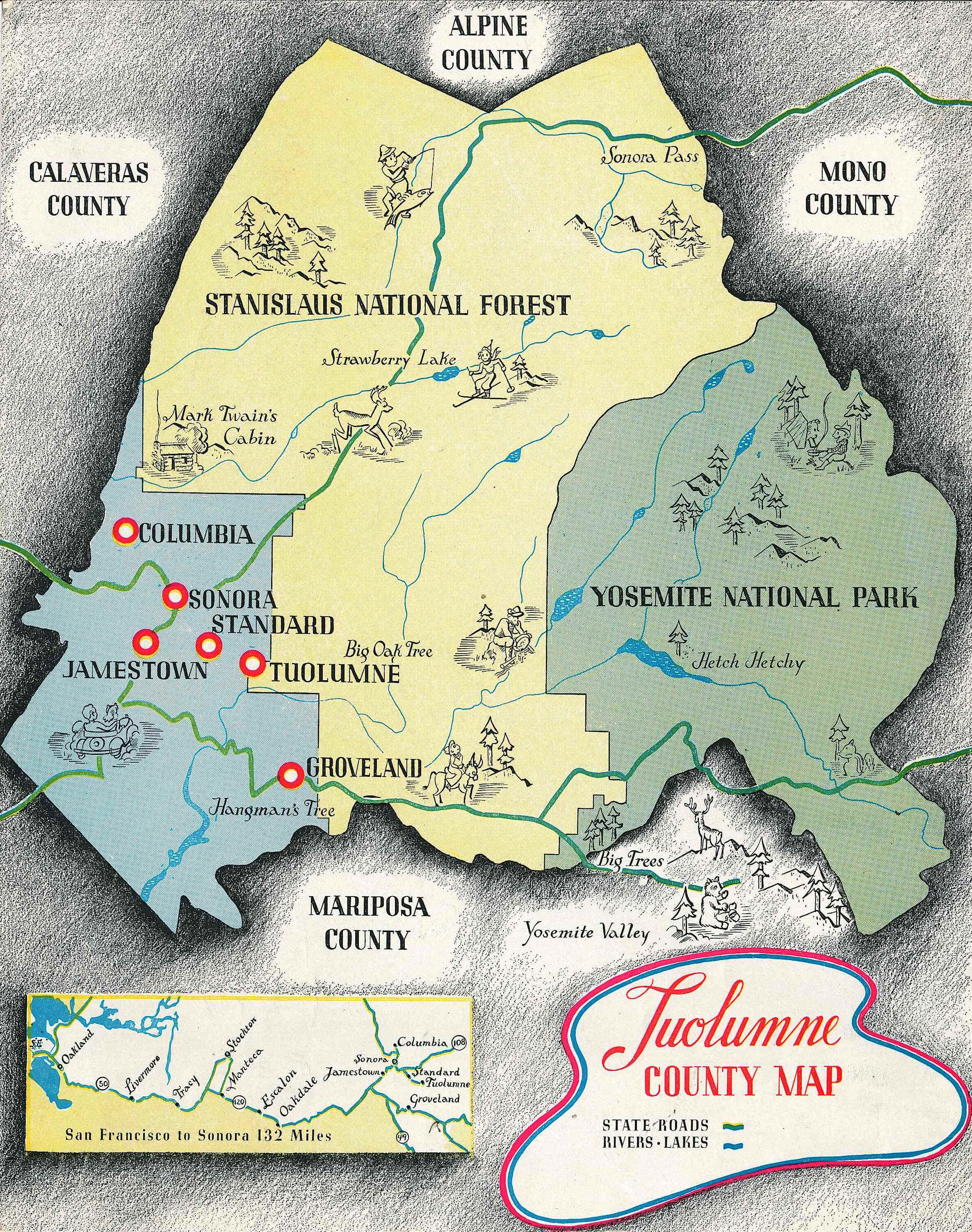

== Geography ==
According to the U.S. Census Bureau, the county has a total area of 2,274 square miles (5,890 km^{2}), of which 2,221 square miles (5,750 km^{2}) is land and 54 square miles (140 km^{2}) (2.4%) is water. A California Department of Forestry document reports Tuolumne County's 1,030,812 acres (4,171.55 km^{2}) include federal lands such as Yosemite National Park, Stanislaus National Forest, Bureau of Land Management lands, and Indian reservations. Notable landforms in the county include Table Mountain.

=== Special Districts ===
Special districts in Tuolumne County include:

- Belleview Elementary School District
- Big Oak Flat-Groveland Unified School District
- Chinese Camp Elementary School District
- Columbia Fire District
- Columbia Union Elementary School District
- Curtis Creek Elementary School District
- Groveland Community Services District
- Jamestown Elementary School District
- Jamestown Fire District
- Mi-Wuk Sugar Pine Fire Protection District
- Sonora Elementary School District
- Sonora Union High School District
- Soulsbyville Elementary School District
- Strawberry Fire District
- Summerville Elementary School District
- Summerville Union High School District
- Tuolumne County Air Pollution Control District
- Tuolumne County Water District No. 1
- Tuolumne Fire District
- Tuolumne Regional Water District
- Tuolumne Utilities District
- Twain Harte Fire District
- Twain Harte-Long Barn Union Elementary School District
- Yosemite Community College District

=== Adjacent counties ===
- Alpine County - north
- Calaveras County - northwest
- Stanislaus County - southwest
- Mariposa County - south
- Madera County - southeast
- Mono County - east
- Merced County - southwest

=== Geographical features ===
Environmental

- Red Hills (Tuolumne County) (Area of Critical Environmental Concern)
- Stanislaus National Forest (National protected area, part)
- Yosemite National Park (NPA, part)

Valleys

- Grand Canyon of the Tuolumne
- Lone Gulch
- Tiltill Valley

== Transportation ==
=== Major highways ===
- California State Route 49
- California State Route 108
- California State Route 120
- California State Route 132

=== Public transportation ===
Tuolumne County Transit bus routes radiate from Sonora to serve most of the county. In Columbia, a connection can be made to Calaveras County Transit. There is no public transportation into or out of Tuolumne County that connects to any of the closest metropolitan areas.

Yosemite Area Regional Transportation System (YARTS) makes a single daily round trip from Sonora into Yosemite Valley during the summer months.

=== Airports ===
Columbia Airport and Pine Mountain Lake Airport are both general aviation airports located in the Southwest and Northeast corners of the county respectively.

== Crime ==
The following table includes the number of incidents reported and the rate per 1,000 persons for each type of offense.

Population and crime rates
| Population | 55,736 | |
| Violent crime | 158 | 2.83 |
| Homicide | 1 | 0.02 |
| Forcible rape | 25 | 0.45 |
| Robbery | 19 | 0.34 |
| Aggravated assault | 113 | 2.03 |
| Property crime | 669 | 12.00 |
| Burglary | 354 | 6.35 |
| Larceny-theft (Note: Only larceny-theft cases involving property over $400 in value are reported as property crimes.) | 846 | 15.18 |
| Motor vehicle theft | 100 | 1.79 |
| Arson | 11 | 0.20 |

=== Cities by population and crime rates ===
Cities by population and crime rates
| City | Population | Violent crimes | Violent crime rate per 1,000 persons | Property crimes | Property crime rate per 1,000 persons |
|---|---|---|---|---|---|
| Sonora | 4,804 | 20 | 4.07 | 311 | 63.33 |

\

== Demographics ==
Historical population
| Census | Pop. | Note | %± |
|---|---|---|---|
| 1850 | 8,351 | | — |
| 1860 | 16,229 | | 94.3% |
| 1870 | 8,150 | | −49.8% |
| 1880 | 7,848 | | −3.7% |
| 1890 | 6,082 | | −22.5% |
| 1900 | 11,166 | | 83.6% |
| 1910 | 9,979 | | −10.6% |
| 1920 | 7,768 | | −22.2% |
| 1930 | 9,271 | | 19.3% |
| 1940 | 10,887 | | 17.4% |
| 1950 | 12,584 | | 15.6% |
| 1960 | 14,404 | | 14.5% |
| 1970 | 22,169 | | 53.9% |
| 1980 | 33,928 | | 53.0% |
| 1990 | 48,456 | | 42.8% |
| 2000 | 54,501 | | 12.5% |
| 2010 | 55,365 | | 1.6% |
| 2020 | 55,620 | | 0.5% |
| 2025 (est.) | 53,160 | ▼ | −4.4% |
U.S. Decennial Census; 1790–1960 1900–1990; 1990–2000 2010 2020

=== 2020 census ===
As of the 2020 census, the county had a population of 55,620 and a median age of 48.9 years. 16.8% of residents were under the age of 18 and 27.1% of residents were 65 years of age or older. For every 100 females there were 107.3 males, and for every 100 females age 18 and over there were 108.0 males age 18 and over.

The racial makeup of the county was 79.5% White, 1.8% Black or African American, 1.8% American Indian and Alaska Native, 1.5% Asian, 0.2% Native Hawaiian and Pacific Islander, 5.0% from some other race, and 10.2% from two or more races. Hispanic or Latino residents of any race comprised 12.8% of the population.

52.2% of residents lived in urban areas, while 47.8% lived in rural areas.

There were 22,711 households in the county, of which 22.6% had children under the age of 18 living with them and 26.5% had a female householder with no spouse or partner present. About 30.6% of all households were made up of individuals and 16.9% had someone living alone who was 65 years of age or older.

There were 31,415 housing units, of which 27.7% were vacant. Among occupied housing units, 71.7% were owner-occupied and 28.3% were renter-occupied. The homeowner vacancy rate was 2.0% and the rental vacancy rate was 5.1%.

=== Racial and ethnic composition ===
Tuolumne County, California – Racial and ethnic composition Note: the US Census treats Hispanic/Latino as an ethnic category. This table excludes Latinos from the racial categories and assigns them to a separate category. Hispanics/Latinos may be of any race.
| Race / Ethnicity (NH = Non-Hispanic) | Pop 1980 | Pop 1990 | Pop 2000 | Pop 2010 | Pop 2020 | % 1980 | % 1990 | % 2000 | % 2010 | % 2020 |
|---|---|---|---|---|---|---|---|---|---|---|
| White alone (NH) | 30,945 | 41,887 | 46,377 | 45,325 | 42,254 | 91.21% | 86.44% | 85.09% | 81.87% | 75.97% |
| Black or African American alone (NH) | 373 | 1,529 | 1,135 | 1,114 | 989 | 1.10% | 3.16% | 2.08% | 2.01% | 1.78% |
| Native American or Alaska Native alone (NH) | 599 | 876 | 864 | 830 | 784 | 1.77% | 1.81% | 1.59% | 1.50% | 1.41% |
| Asian alone (NH) | 189 | 362 | 377 | 530 | 770 | 0.56% | 0.75% | 0.69% | 0.96% | 1.38% |
| Native Hawaiian or Pacific Islander alone (NH) | x | x | 81 | 62 | 110 | x | x | 0.15% | 0.11% | 0.20% |
| Other race alone (NH) | 41 | 76 | 47 | 230 | 313 | 0.12% | 0.16% | 0.09% | 0.42% | 0.56% |
| Mixed race or Multiracial (NH) | x | x | 1,175 | 1,356 | 3,276 | x | x | 2.16% | 2.45% | 5.89% |
| Hispanic or Latino (any race) | 1,781 | 3,726 | 4,445 | 5,918 | 7,124 | 5.25% | 7.69% | 8.16% | 10.69% | 12.81% |
| Total | 33,928 | 48,456 | 54,501 | 55,365 | 55,620 | 100.00% | 100.00% | 100.00% | 100.00% | 100.00% |

=== American Community Survey 2025 data ===
The United States Census Bureau estimated that in 2025, Tuolumne County’s population was 53.160. It was also estimated that the county's population was 75,49% Non-Hispanic White, 14,98% Hispanic or Latino, 1,56% Non-Hispanic Black, 1,62% Asian, 1,49% Native American, 0,30% Pacific Islander, and 4,56% Multiracial.

| Total | Population | Percentage |
|---|---|---|
| Non-Hispanic White | 40.133 | 75,49% |
| Hispanic or Latino | 7.963 | 14,98% |
| Non-Hispanic Black | 828 | 1,56% |
| Asian | 859 | 1,62% |
| Native American | 793 | 1,49% |
| Pacific Islander | 158 | 0,30% |
| Non-Hispanic Multiracial | 2.426 | 4,56% |

=== 2010 census ===
The 2010 United States census reported that Tuolumne County had a population of 55,365. The racial makeup of Tuolumne County was 48,274 (87.2%) White, 1,143 (2.1%) African American, 1,039 (1.9%) Native American, 572 (1.0%) Asian, 76 (0.1%) Pacific Islander, 2,238 (4.0%) from other races, and 2,023 (3.7%) from two or more races. Hispanic or Latino of any race were 5,918 persons (10.7%).

Population reported at 2010 United States census
| The County | Total; Population | White | African; American | Native; American | Asian | Pacific; Islander | other races | two or more races | Hispanic or Latino (of any race) |
| Tuolumne County | 55,365 | 48,274 | 1,143 | 1,039 | 572 | 76 | 2,238 | 2,023 | 5,918 |
| Incorporated cities and towns | Total; Population | White | African; American | Native; American | Asian | Pacific; Islander | other races | two or more races | Hispanic or Latino (of any race) |
| Sonora | 4,903 | 4,402 | 24 | 95 | 79 | 12 | 84 | 207 | 542 |
| Census-designated places | Total; Population | White | African; American | Native; American | Asian | Pacific; Islander | other races | two or more races | Hispanic or Latino (of any race) |
| Cedar Ridge | 1,132 | 1,066 | 3 | 6 | 5 | 1 | 5 | 46 | 71 |
| Chinese Camp | 126 | 92 | 0 | 7 | 0 | 0 | 16 | 11 | 25 |
| Cold Springs | 181 | 175 | 1 | 3 | 1 | 0 | 0 | 1 | 4 |
| Columbia | 2,297 | 2,064 | 27 | 26 | 29 | 1 | 27 | 123 | 171 |
| East Sonora | 2,266 | 2,129 | 7 | 16 | 32 | 1 | 35 | 46 | 152 |
| Groveland | 601 | 542 | 2 | 9 | 9 | 2 | 17 | 20 | 49 |
| Jamestown | 3,433 | 2,948 | 20 | 96 | 27 | 4 | 135 | 203 | 511 |
| Long Barn | 155 | 140 | 1 | 3 | 0 | 0 | 5 | 6 | 13 |
| Mi-Wuk Village | 941 | 871 | 5 | 17 | 3 | 0 | 11 | 34 | 71 |
| Mono Vista | 3,127 | 2,796 | 6 | 58 | 38 | 8 | 61 | 160 | 300 |
| Phoenix Lake | 4,269 | 3,991 | 15 | 40 | 50 | 3 | 51 | 119 | 305 |
| Pine Mountain Lake | 2,796 | 2,596 | 18 | 25 | 24 | 7 | 21 | 105 | 183 |
| Sierra Village | 456 | 421 | 3 | 7 | 3 | 1 | 7 | 14 | 36 |
| Soulsbyville | 2,215 | 2,038 | 3 | 41 | 13 | 2 | 38 | 80 | 206 |
| Strawberry | 86 | 82 | 0 | 0 | 0 | 0 | 1 | 3 | 7 |
| Tuolumne City | 1,779 | 1,547 | 13 | 83 | 12 | 1 | 50 | 73 | 206 |
| Tuttletown | 668 | 613 | 5 | 14 | 5 | 1 | 12 | 18 | 48 |
| Twain Harte | 2,226 | 2,026 | 5 | 34 | 31 | 4 | 46 | 80 | 171 |
| Other unincorporated areas | Total; Population | White | African; American | Native; American | Asian | Pacific; Islander | other races | two or more races | Hispanic or Latino (of any race) |
| All others not CDPs (combined) | 21,708 | 17,735 | 985 | 459 | 211 | 28 | 1,616 | 674 | 2,847 |

=== 2000 census ===
As of the census of 2000, there were 54,501 people, 21,004 households, and 14,240 families residing in the county. The population density was 9/km^{2} (23/mi^{2}). There were 28,336 housing units at an average density of 5/km^{2} (13/mi^{2}). The racial makeup of the county was 89.5% White, 2.1% Black or African American, 1.8% Native American, 0.7% Asian, 0.2% Pacific Islander, 2.9% from other races, and 2.8% from two or more races. 8.2% of the population were Hispanic or Latino of any race. 94.7% spoke English and 3.5% Spanish as their first language.

There were 21,004 households, out of which 26.1% had children under the age of 18 living with them, 54.4% were married couples living together, 9.6% had a female householder with no husband present, and 32.2% were non-families. 26.0% of all households were made up of individuals, and 11.70% had someone living alone who was 65 years of age or older. The average household size was 2.36 and the average family size was 2.82.

In the county, the population was spread out, with 20.7% under the age of 18, 7.6% from 18 to 24, 25.3% from 25 to 44, 27.9% from 45 to 64, and 18.5% who were 65 years of age or older. The median age was 43 years. For every 100 females there were 111.50 males. For every 100 females age 18 and over, there were 112.20 males.

The median income for a household in the county was $38,725, and the median income for a family was $44,327. Males had a median income of $35,373 versus $25,805 for females. The per capita income for the county was $21,015. About 8.1% of families and 11.4% of the population were below the poverty line, including 16.2% of those under age 18 and 4.0% of those age 65 or over.

== Government and policing ==
=== County government ===
The Government of Tuolumne County is established and defined by the California Constitution and is a five-member elected Board Of Supervisors who serve four year elected terms. The government provides services such as elections and voter registration, law enforcement, jails, vital records, property records, tax collection, public health, and social services. The Board is the government for all unincorporated areas. Sonora is the only incorporated city in Tuolumne County.

=== Sheriff and police ===
The Tuolumne County Sheriff provides court protection, jail administration, and coroner services for the entire county. It provides patrol and detective services for the unincorporated areas of the county.

Within the city limits of Sonora, patrol and detective services are served by the Sonora Police Department.

== Politics ==
=== Voter registration statistics ===
Population and registered voters
| Total population | 55,736 | |
| Registered voters (Note: Percentage of registered voters with respect to total population. Percentages of party members with respect to registered voters follow.) | 32,101 | 57.6% |
| Democratic | 10,306 | 32.1% |
| Republican | 13,529 | 42.1% |
| Democratic–Republican spread | -3,223 | -10.0% |
| Independent | 1,313 | 4.1% |
| Green | 248 | 0.8% |
| Libertarian | 248 | 0.8% |
| Peace and Freedom | 100 | 0.3% |
| Americans Elect | 1 | 0.0% |
| Other | 68 | 0.2% |
| No party preference | 6,288 | 19.6% |

==== Cities by population and voter registration ====
Cities by population and voter registration
| City | Population | Registered voters | Democratic | Republican | D–R spread | Other | No party preference |
|---|---|---|---|---|---|---|---|
| Sonora | 4,899 | 55.0% | 38.2% | 32.4% | +5.8% | 10.7% | 22.8% |

=== Overview ===
Tuolumne county tends to vote Republican in Presidential and congressional elections. The last Democrat to win the county was Bill Clinton in 1992. In the 2008 presidential election, 14,988 votes were counted for John McCain with former president Barack Obama receiving 11,532 votes.

United States presidential election results for Tuolumne County, California
| Year | Republican | | Democratic | | Third party(ies) | |
| Year | No. | % | No. | % | No. | % |
|---|---|---|---|---|---|---|
| 1892 | 739 | 40.56% | 916 | 50.27% | 167 | 9.17% |
| 1896 | 834 | 38.06% | 1,308 | 59.70% | 49 | 2.24% |
| 1900 | 1,309 | 45.09% | 1,530 | 52.70% | 64 | 2.20% |
| 1904 | 1,280 | 48.76% | 1,006 | 38.32% | 339 | 12.91% |
| 1908 | 943 | 44.40% | 878 | 41.34% | 303 | 14.27% |
| 1912 | 8 | 0.30% | 1,459 | 55.58% | 1,158 | 44.11% |
| 1916 | 1,057 | 36.17% | 1,584 | 54.21% | 281 | 9.62% |
| 1920 | 1,285 | 59.38% | 659 | 30.45% | 220 | 10.17% |
| 1924 | 1,287 | 43.03% | 357 | 11.94% | 1,347 | 45.04% |
| 1928 | 1,731 | 54.80% | 1,360 | 43.05% | 68 | 2.15% |
| 1932 | 1,145 | 30.18% | 2,521 | 66.45% | 128 | 3.37% |
| 1936 | 1,199 | 26.40% | 3,303 | 72.72% | 40 | 0.88% |
| 1940 | 2,004 | 35.63% | 3,541 | 62.96% | 79 | 1.40% |
| 1944 | 1,864 | 41.77% | 2,566 | 57.51% | 32 | 0.72% |
| 1948 | 2,639 | 48.21% | 2,561 | 46.78% | 274 | 5.01% |
| 1952 | 4,050 | 59.18% | 2,735 | 39.96% | 59 | 0.86% |
| 1956 | 3,619 | 52.12% | 3,310 | 47.67% | 14 | 0.20% |
| 1960 | 3,691 | 49.11% | 3,781 | 50.31% | 44 | 0.59% |
| 1964 | 2,861 | 36.59% | 4,939 | 63.16% | 20 | 0.26% |
| 1968 | 4,330 | 47.48% | 3,913 | 42.91% | 876 | 9.61% |
| 1972 | 5,894 | 54.29% | 4,596 | 42.34% | 366 | 3.37% |
| 1976 | 6,104 | 46.94% | 6,492 | 49.93% | 407 | 3.13% |
| 1980 | 8,810 | 54.85% | 5,449 | 33.92% | 1,804 | 11.23% |
| 1984 | 10,485 | 58.09% | 7,283 | 40.35% | 283 | 1.57% |
| 1988 | 10,646 | 54.00% | 8,717 | 44.22% | 352 | 1.79% |
| 1992 | 8,525 | 35.26% | 9,216 | 38.12% | 6,437 | 26.62% |
| 1996 | 10,386 | 47.27% | 8,950 | 40.73% | 2,636 | 12.00% |
| 2000 | 13,172 | 55.51% | 9,359 | 39.44% | 1,196 | 5.04% |
| 2004 | 15,745 | 60.02% | 10,104 | 38.51% | 386 | 1.47% |
| 2008 | 14,988 | 55.14% | 11,532 | 42.43% | 661 | 2.43% |
| 2012 | 13,880 | 56.22% | 9,998 | 40.50% | 809 | 3.28% |
| 2016 | 14,551 | 57.00% | 9,123 | 35.74% | 1,855 | 7.27% |
| 2020 | 17,689 | 58.17% | 11,978 | 39.39% | 741 | 2.44% |
| 2024 | 17,210 | 59.72% | 10,909 | 37.86% | 697 | 2.42% |

Tuolumne County is in California's 5th congressional district, represented by Republican Tom McClintock. In the state legislature Tuolumne is in the 8th Assembly district, which is held by Republican David Tangipa and the 4th Senate district, which is held by Republican Marie Alvarado-Gil.

== Communities ==
=== City ===
- Sonora (county seat)

=== Census-designated places ===
- Cedar Ridge
- Chinese Camp
- Cold Springs
- Columbia
- East Sonora
- Groveland
- Jamestown
- Long Barn
- Mi-Wuk Village
- Mono Vista
- Phoenix Lake
- Pine Mountain Lake
- Sierra Village
- Soulsbyville
- Strawberry
- Tuolumne
- Tuttletown
- Twain Harte

=== Unincorporated communities ===
- Bumblebee
- Confidence
- Dardanelle
- Deadwood
- Mather
- Moccasin
- Pinecrest
- Priest
- Standard

=== Population ranking ===
The population ranking of the following table is based on the 2010 census of Tuolumne County.

† county seat

| Rank | City/Town/etc. | Municipal type | Population (2010 Census) |
|---|---|---|---|
| 1 | † Sonora | City | 4,610 |
| 2 | Phoenix Lake | CDP | 4,269 |
| 3 | Jamestown | CDP | 3,433 |
| 4 | Mono Vista | CDP | 3,127 |
| 5 | Pine Mountain Lake | CDP | 2,796 |
| 6 | Columbia | CDP | 2,297 |
| 7 | East Sonora | CDP | 2,266 |
| 8 | Twain Harte | CDP | 2,226 |
| 9 | Soulsbyville | CDP | 2,215 |
| 10 | Tuolumne City | CDP | 1,779 |
| 11 | Cedar Ridge | CDP | 1,132 |
| 12 | Mi-Wuk Village | CDP | 941 |
| 13 | Tuttletown | CDP | 668 |
| 14 | Groveland | CDP | 601 |
| 15 | Sierra Village | CDP | 456 |
| 16 | Tuolumne Rancheria | AIAN | 185 |
| 17 | Cold Springs | CDP | 181 |
| 18 | Long Barn | CDP | 155 |
| 19 | Chinese Camp | CDP | 126 |
| 20 | Strawberry | CDP | 126 |
| 21 | Chicken Ranch Rancheria | AIAN | 91 |

== See also ==
- National Register of Historic Places listings in Tuolumne County, California
