= Tiltill Valley =

Valley in Tuolumne County, California

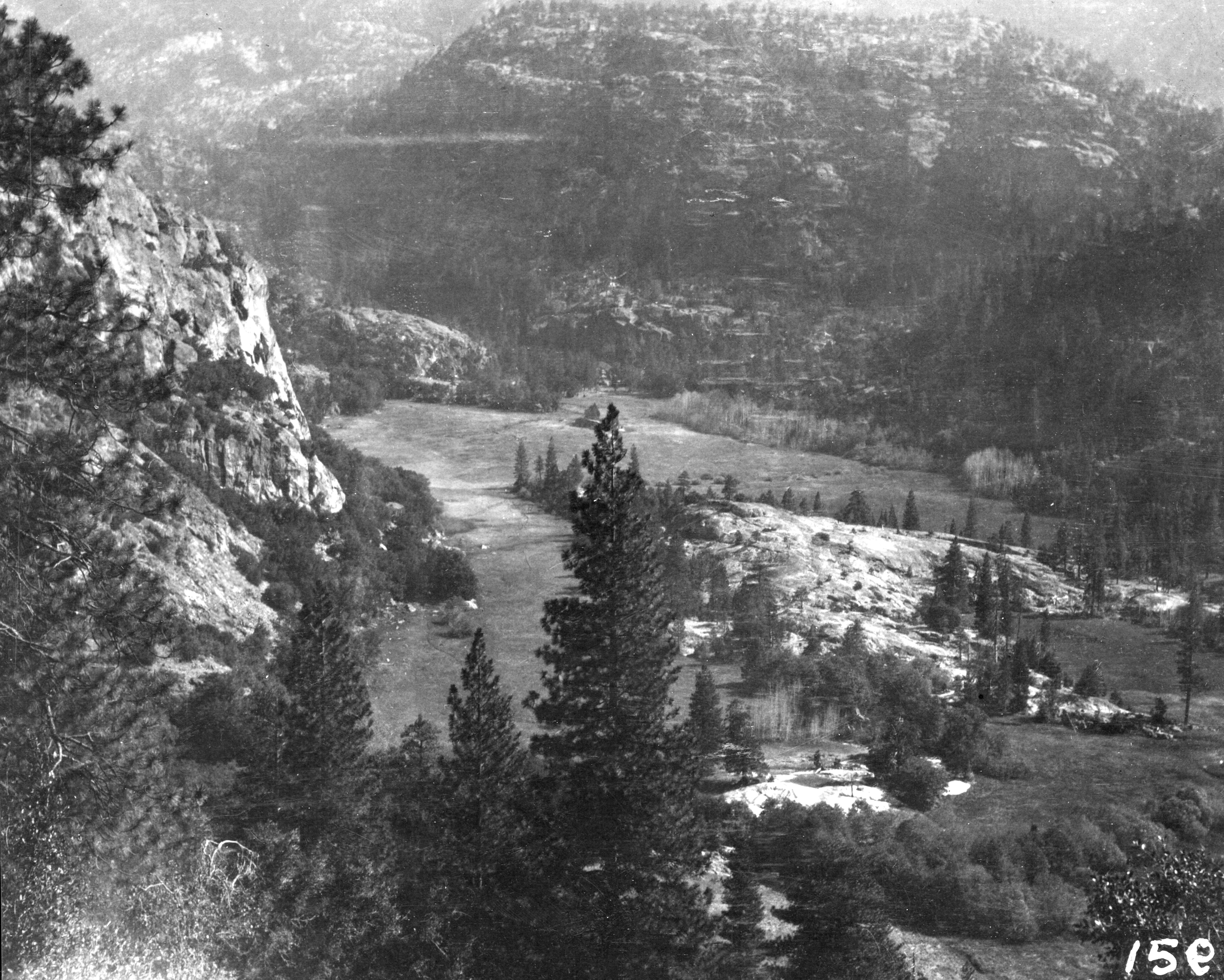
- Tiltill Valley, viewed from Lake Vernon Trail.
- Floor elevation: 5,580 feet (1,700 m)

Geography
- Location: Hetch Hetchy watershed, Yosemite National Park, California.
- Coordinates: 37°58′28″N 119°41′52″W
- Interactive map of Tiltill Valley

Tiltill Valley is a remote valley in northerwestern Yosemite National Park. It is accessible only to hikers and equestrians. The valley is most easily reached via trail heads in the vicinity of the Hetch Hetchy Valley and Lake Eleanor. The valley provides access to many remote alpine lakes throughout the largely untamed wilderness that defines the northern portion of Yosemite National Park and the adjacent Emigrant Wilderness.
