= Taft Mosswood, California =

Taft Mosswood
- Unincorporated Community; Census Designated Place
- Location in San Joaquin County and the state of California

- Location in the United States
- Coordinates: 37°54′59″N 121°16′54″W
- Country: United States
- State: California
- County: San Joaquin

Government
  - Senate: Jerry McNerney (D)
  - Assembly: Rhodesia Ransom (D)
  - U. S. Congress: Josh Harder (D)

Area
  - Total: 0.479 sq mi (1.240 km^{2})
  - Land: 0.466 sq mi (1.206 km^{2})
  - Water: 0.013 sq mi (0.034 km^{2}) 2.74%

Population (2020)
  - Total: 1,636
  - Density: 3,513/sq mi (1,357/km^{2})
- Time zone: UTC-8 (PST)
  - Summer (DST): UTC-7 (PDT)
- ZIP code: 95231
- Area code: 209
- FIPS code: 06-77595

Taft Mosswood is a census-designated place (CDP) in San Joaquin County, California, United States. The population was 1,636 at the 2020 census, up from 1,530 at the 2010 census. It comprises an unincorporated island surrounded by the City of Stockton.

== Geography ==
Taft Mosswood is located at 37°54′59″N 121°16′54″W (37.916324, -121.281563).

According to the United States Census Bureau, the CDP has a total area of 0.5 square miles (1.3 km^{2}), 97.26% of it land and 2.74% of it water.

== Demographics ==
Historical population
Census	Pop.	Note	%±
2000	1,388		—
2010	1,530		10.2%
2020	1,636		6.9%
U.S. Decennial Census; 1860–1870 1880-1890; 1900 1910 1920; 1930 1940 1950; 1960 1970 1980; 1990 2000 2010

Taft Mosswood first appeared as a census designated place in the 2000 U.S. census.

=== 2020 census ===
As of the 2020 census, Taft Mosswood had a population of 1,636 and a population density of 3,518.3 inhabitants per square mile (1,358.4/km^{2}). The median age was 30.3 years. The age distribution was 32.3% under the age of 18, 10.7% aged 18 to 24, 24.1% aged 25 to 44, 21.8% aged 45 to 64, and 11.1% aged 65 or older. For every 100 females, there were 103.2 males, and for every 100 females age 18 and over, there were 105.6 males age 18 and over.

The census reported that 99.6% of the population lived in households, 0.4% lived in non-institutionalized group quarters, and no one was institutionalized. 100.0% of residents lived in urban areas, while 0.0% lived in rural areas.

There were 405 households, of which 54.1% had children under the age of 18 living in them. Of all households, 46.9% were married-couple households, 10.6% were cohabiting couple households, 17.3% had a male householder with no spouse or partner present, and 25.2% had a female householder with no spouse or partner present. About 9.6% of all households were made up of individuals and 5.7% had someone living alone who was 65 years of age or older. The average household size was 4.02. There were 338 families (83.5% of all households).

There were 427 housing units at an average density of 918.3 units per square mile (354.6 units/km^{2}). Of the housing units, 5.2% were vacant. Of the occupied units, 59.3% were owner-occupied and 40.7% were occupied by renters. The homeowner vacancy rate was 1.6% and the rental vacancy rate was 1.8%.

Racial composition as of the 2020 census
Race	Number	Percent
White	221	13.5%
Black or African American	124	7.6%
American Indian and Alaska Native	42	2.6%
Asian	222	13.6%
Native Hawaiian and Other Pacific Islander	7	0.4%
Some other race	762	46.6%
Two or more races	258	15.8%
Hispanic or Latino (of any race)	1,204	73.6%

=== 2023 estimates ===
In 2023, the US Census Bureau estimated that the median household income was $55,526, and the per capita income was $23,920. About 25.9% of families and 19.0% of the population were below the poverty line.

== Education ==
It is in the Stockton Unified School District.
