= San Joaquin County, California =

County in California, United States

San Joaquin County
- County
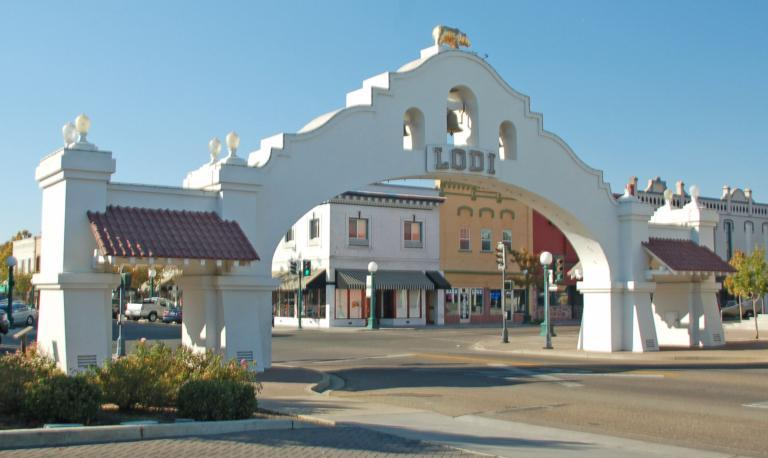
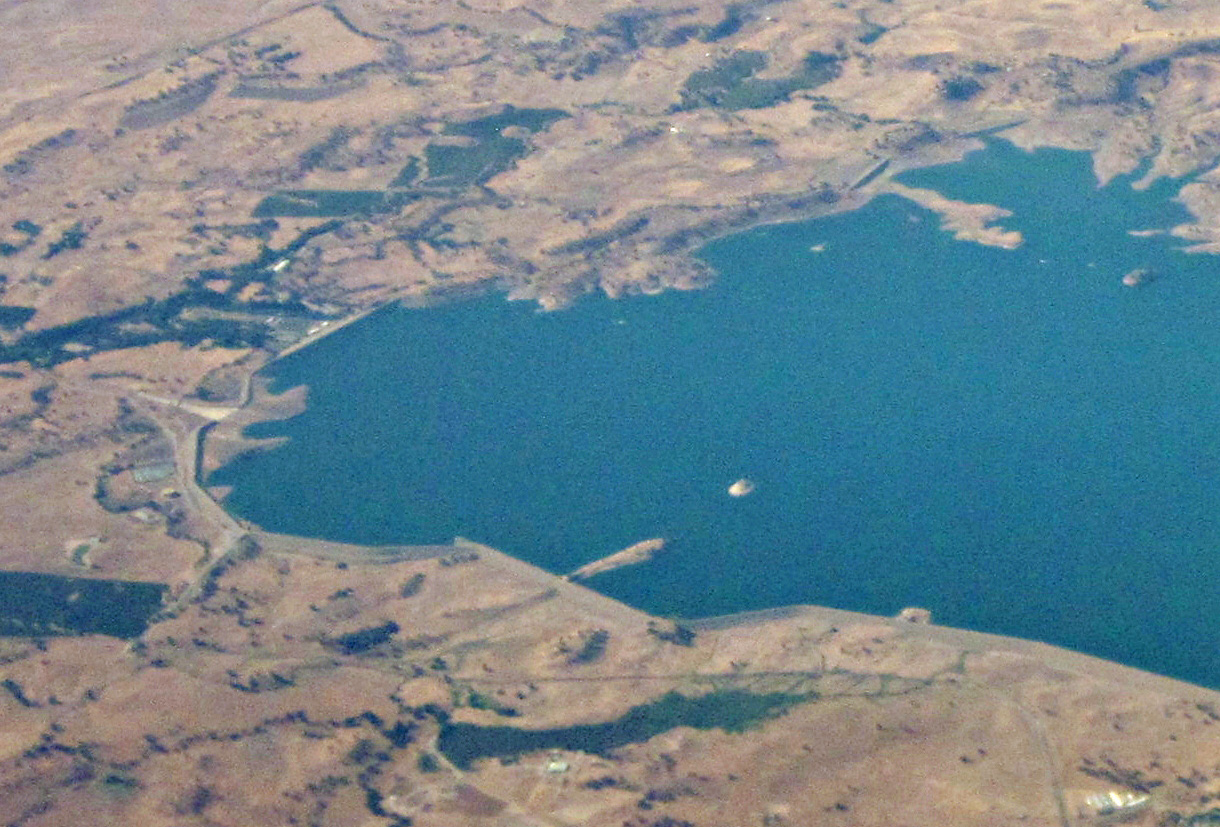
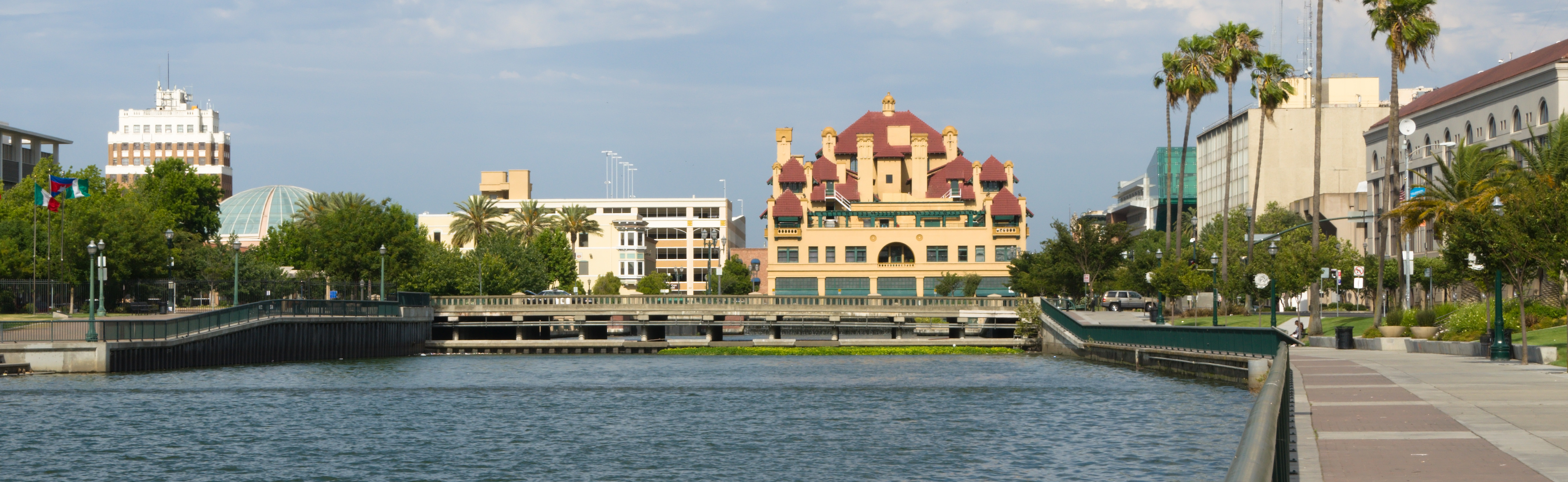
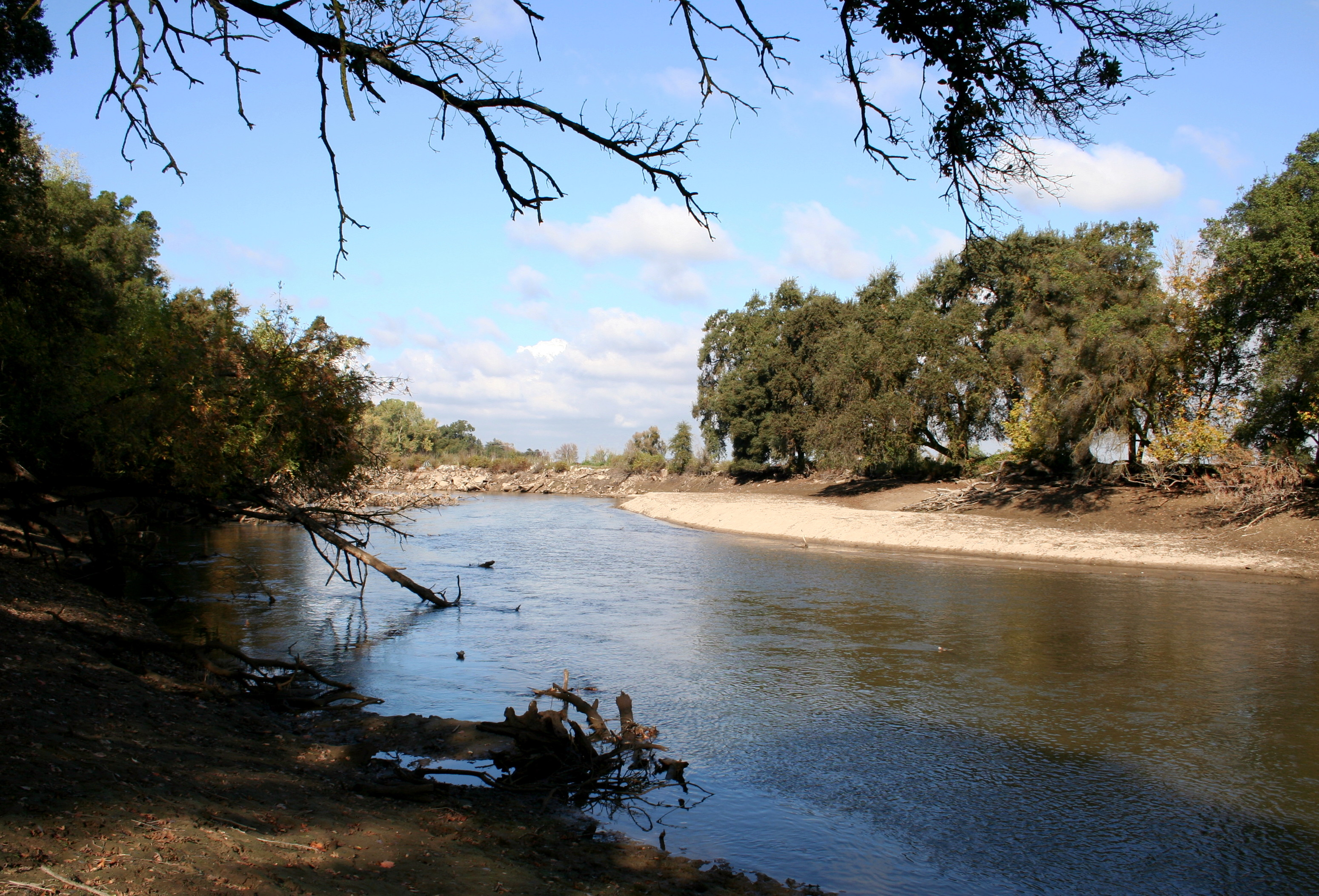
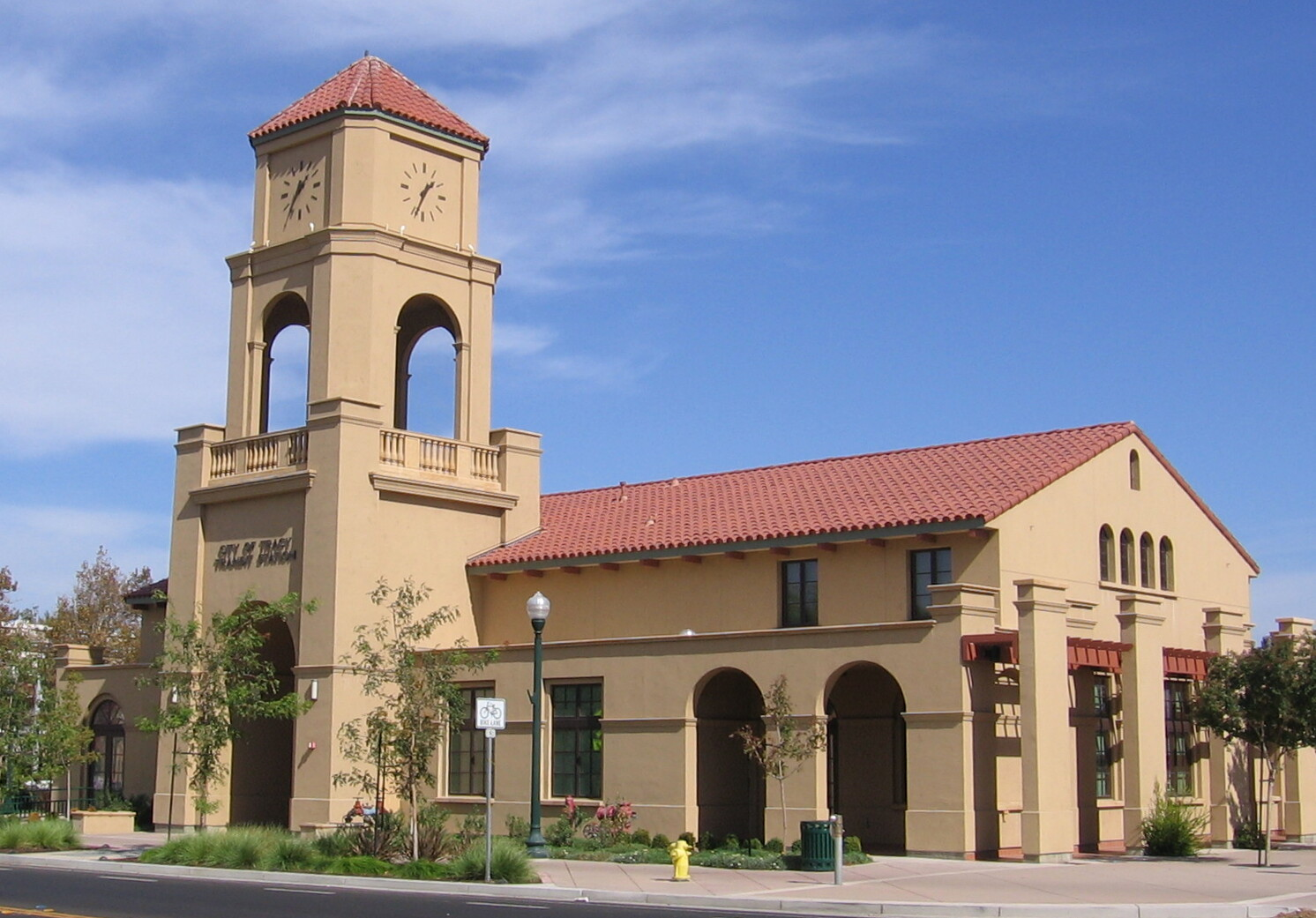
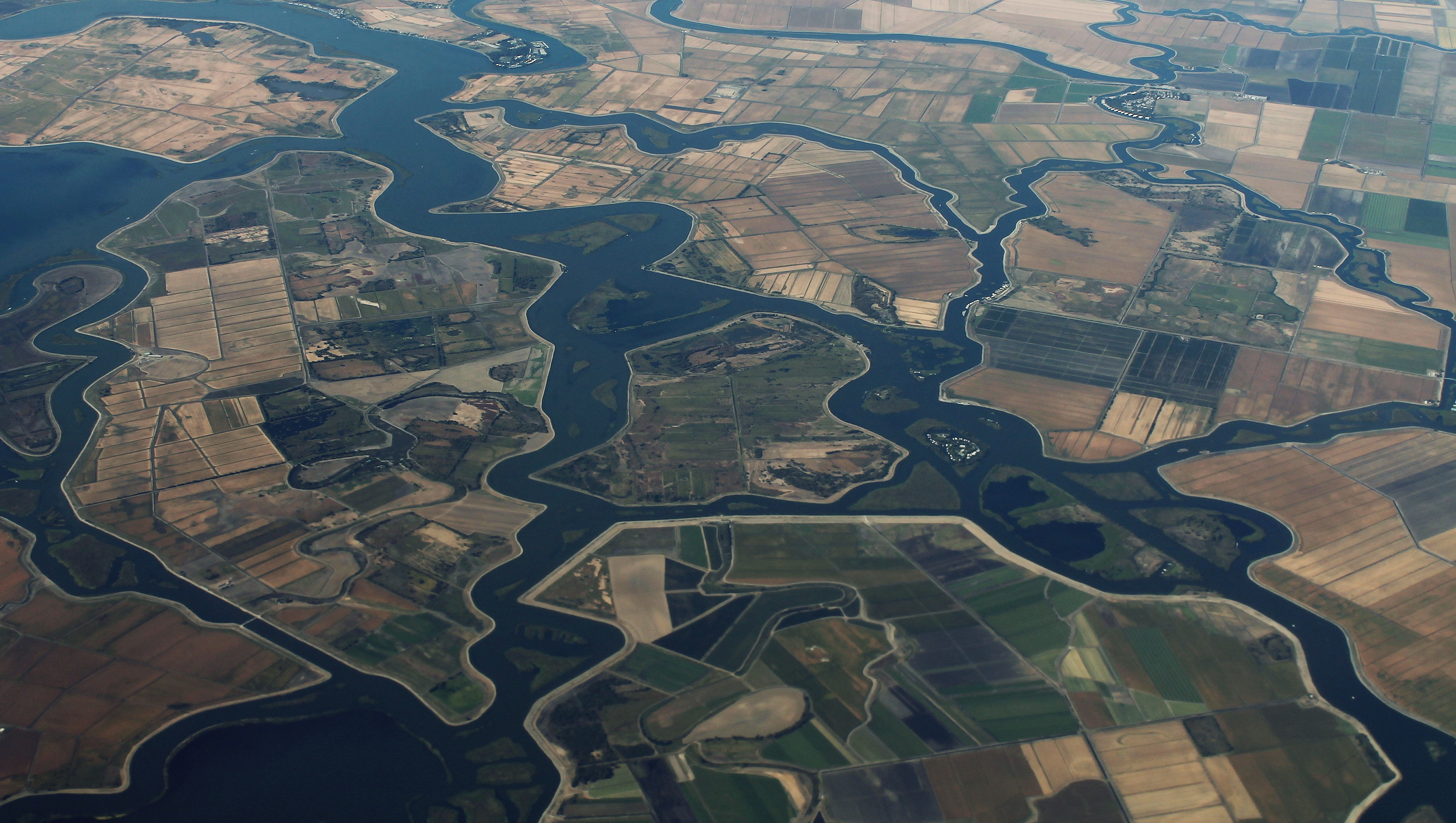
- Lodi Lake Camanche Stockton and the Stockton Channel Mokelumne River Tracy Sacramento-San Joaquin River Delta

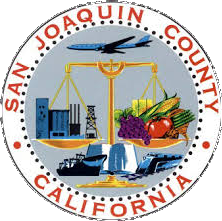
- Seal
- Nickname: "Sanwa"
- Motto: "Greatness grows here."
- Interactive map of San Joaquin County
- Location in the state of California
- Country: United States
- State: California
- Region: San Joaquin Valley
- Incorporated: February 18, 1850
- Named for: San Joaquin River, which was named for St. Joachim
- County seat: Stockton
- Largest city: Stockton

Government
  - Type: Council–Administrator
  - Body: Board of Supervisors
  - Chair: Sonny Dhaliwal
  - Vice Chair: Steven J. Ding
  - Board of Supervisors: Supervisors: Mario Gardea; Paul Canepa; Sonny Dhaliwal; Steven J. Ding; Robert Rickman
  - County Administrator: Jerome C. Wilverding

Area
  - Total: 1,426 sq mi (3,690 km^{2})
  - Land: 1,391 sq mi (3,600 km^{2})
  - Water: 35 sq mi (91 km^{2})
- Highest elevation: 3,629 ft (1,106 m)

Population (2020)
  - Total: 779,233
  - Estimate (2025): 823,815 ▲
  - Density: 560.2/sq mi (216.3/km^{2})

GDP
  - Total: $40.227 billion (2022)
- Time zone: UTC−8 (Pacific Standard Time)
  - Summer (DST): UTC−7 (Pacific Daylight Time)
- Area codes: 209, 350
- FIPS code: 06-077
- GNIS feature ID: 277303
- Congressional districts: 9th, 13th
- Website: www.sjgov.org

San Joaquin County (/ˌsæn hwɑːˈkiːn/ SAN whah-KEEN; Spanish: San Joaquín, meaning "St. Joachim"), officially the County of San Joaquin, is a county in the U.S. state of California. As of the 2020 United States census, the population was 779,233. The county seat is Stockton.

San Joaquin County comprises the entirety of the Stockton metropolitan statistical area, which is adjacent to the San Francisco Bay Area. Located in California's Central Valley, the county has experienced rapid population growth driven by long-distance commuters priced out of the Bay Area's core. Approximately 10% of San Joaquin County's residents commute 90 or more minutes each way to work, a higher share than any comparable county in the United States. The Altamont Corridor Express, a weekday commuter rail service, connects San Joaquin County with San Jose.

The county is a major winemaking hub, with more acres dedicated to wine grape production than any other county in California.

== History ==
San Joaquin County was one of the original counties of California, created in 1850 at the time of statehood.

The county was named after the San Joaquin River, which flows north through it. In the early 19th century, Lieutenant Gabriel Moraga, commanding an expedition in the lower great California Central Valley, gave the name of San Joaquin (meaning Joachim) to the San Joaquin River, which springs from the southern Sierra Nevada. San Joaquin County is the site of the San Joaquin Valley's first permanent residence.

Prior to incorporation in 1850, the area now encompassing San Joaquin County was inhabited by the Yokuts and Miwok native peoples. These communities lived in villages throughout the region, consuming diverse diets that reflected the flora and fauna of the California Delta. Acorns from Valley Oak trees, salmon from the San Joaquin, Mokelumne, Calaveras, and Stanislaus rivers, and Tule Elk were staples of the native diet, which was supplemented with various native berries and plants. The native population of San Joaquin County fell dramatically during a statewide epidemic of malaria in 1828, and a subsequent rebellion of native peoples in the Central Valley, led by Chief Estanislao.

Between 1843 and 1846, during the era when California was a province of independent Mexico, five Mexican land grants were made in what would become San Joaquin County: Rancho Campo de los Franceses, Pescadero (Grimes), Pescadero (Pico), Sanjon de los Moquelumnes, and Thompson. The largest of these grants was the Rancho Campos de los Franceses, secured by Charles Weber and Guillermo Gulnac, which was eventually developed into the city of Stockton.

As the Gold Rush drew miners to the Sierra Nevada, Stockton grew into a major logistical and mercantile hub for the San Joaquin Valley and mother lode, which allowed for the City and County populations to rise significantly between 1850 and 1870. As the state's gold economy waned in the 1870s, San Joaquin County transitioned into a major national center of agriculture, which it remains to this day. Reclamation of the California delta, which began in 1869, strongly benefited this agricultural growth. The importance of agriculture to the region's economy led to the creation of a dynamic industrial engineering sector in Stockton, Lodi, and nearby Rio Vista in the 1880s. Notably, the Sperry Flour Company, Holt Manufacturing Company, the operation of R. G. LeTourneau, Samson Ironworks, and the canning empire of Tillie Lewis were firms of national and international significance. Holt Manufacturing, led by Benjamin Holt, would pioneer the industrial manufacturing and sales of the tractor, while R. G. LeTourneau patented the bulldozer in 1926.

=== Importance to railroads ===
The Central Pacific Railroad in the 1860s utilized San Joaquin County's exceptionally flat terrain to construct a rail line from Sacramento to Stockton and then southwest through Altamont Pass to the San Francisco Bay. Notably, the Mossdale Bridge crossing the San Joaquin River was the last link on the first transcontinental railroad from the Missouri River to the Pacific Ocean. In 1909, a second railroad, the Western Pacific, utilized the same route through Stockton to reach the Bay Area. In the early 1900s, the Santa Fe Railroad constructed from Bakersfield and Fresno went through Stockton to travel northwards, reaching Oakland. Smaller lines constructed at Stockton were the Tidewater Southern to Modesto and the Central California Traction to Sacramento. Both started as electrically powered. These railroads encouraged the growth of farms, orchards, and ranches in San Joaquin County and adjacent counties.

=== Tracy tire fire ===
On August 7, 1998, a tire fire ignited at S.F. Royster's Tire Disposal just south of Tracy on South MacArthur Drive, near Linne Rd. The tire dump held over 7 million illegally stored tires and was allowed to burn for more than two years before it was extinguished. Allowing the fire to burn was considered to be a better way to avoid groundwater contamination than putting it out. However, the cleanup cost $19 million and local groundwater was still discovered to be contaminated.

The Corral Fire

On June 1, 2024, the Corral Fire ignited south of Tracy. It was the first major wildfire of 2024. The fire started at Site 300 of the Lawrence Livermore National Laboratory. The fire grew fast, as on the same day, it went from 30 acres at 4:44pm, to 4,940 acres at around 7:50pm. By the end of the day, CAL FIRE Santa Clara Unit was assigned to the wildfire.

The next day, June 2, 2024, two firefighters were injured while the fire reached 12,500 acres. It reached peak size at 6:52 pm, standing at 14,168 acres. Two-hundred households were evacuated. On June 3, 2024 with the fire still at peak size, CAL FIRE assigned 45 engines, 15 water tenders, 16 dozers, 14 hand crews, and 40 other vehicles, totaling 475 personnel. By that evening, one house was destroyed.

On June 6, 2024, the fire was declared 100% contained. In the chaos of those last five days, two firefighters were injured, one structure was destroyed, and costed an estimated $3.5 million (2024 USD) to suppress.

== Geography ==
According to the U.S. Census Bureau, the county has a total area of 1,426 square miles (3,690 km^{2}), of which 1,391 square miles (3,600 km^{2}) is land and 35 square miles (91 km^{2}), comprising 2.5%, is water. The county has a very low inland elevation and a very flat drainage basin for the San Joaquin River and its numerous tributaries. With the resulting exceptionally high water table, the county is a marshy and swampy delta with a tendency to flood in the spring with melting snow runoff from the Sierra Nevada Mountains.

The geographical center of San Joaquin County is near Stockton at approximately 37°54'N 121°12'W (37.9,-121.2).

=== National protected area ===
- San Joaquin River National Wildlife Refuge (part)

== Demographics ==
Historical population
Census	Pop.	Note	%±
1850	3,647		—
1860	9,435		158.7%
1870	21,050		123.1%
1880	24,349		15.7%
1890	28,629		17.6%
1900	35,452		23.8%
1910	50,731		43.1%
1920	79,905		57.5%
1930	102,940		28.8%
1940	134,207		30.4%
1950	200,750		49.6%
1960	249,989		24.5%
1970	290,208		16.1%
1980	347,342		19.7%
1990	480,628		38.4%
2000	563,598		17.3%
2010	685,306		21.6%
2020	779,233		13.7%
2025 (est.)	823,815	▲	5.7%
U.S. Decennial Census; 1790–1960 1900–1990; 1990–2000 2010 2020

=== 2020 census ===
As of the 2020 census, the county had a population of 779,233. The median age was 35.4 years, 26.4% of residents were under the age of 18, and 13.7% were 65 years of age or older. For every 100 females there were 99.3 males, and for every 100 females age 18 and over there were 97.3 males.

The racial makeup of the county was 34.3% White, 7.7% Black or African American, 1.6% American Indian and Alaska Native, 17.9% Asian, 0.7% Native Hawaiian and Pacific Islander, 23.3% from some other race, and 14.5% from two or more races. Hispanic or Latino residents of any race comprised 41.8% of the population.

92.2% of residents lived in urban areas, while 7.8% lived in rural areas.

There were 241,119 households in the county, of which 41.7% had children under the age of 18 living with them and 25.1% had a female householder with no spouse or partner present. About 19.0% of all households were made up of individuals and 8.7% had someone living alone who was 65 years of age or older.

There were 251,453 housing units, of which 4.1% were vacant. Among occupied housing units, 59.3% were owner-occupied and 40.7% were renter-occupied. The homeowner vacancy rate was 1.1% and the rental vacancy rate was 3.6%.

=== Racial and ethnic composition ===
San Joaquin County, California – Racial and ethnic composition Note: the US Census treats Hispanic/Latino as an ethnic category. This table excludes Latinos from the racial categories and assigns them to a separate category. Hispanics/Latinos may be of any race.
Race / Ethnicity (NH = Non-Hispanic)	Pop 1980	Pop 1990	Pop 2000	Pop 2010	Pop 2020	% 1980	% 1990	% 2000	% 2010	% 2020
White alone (NH)	237,233	282,766	267,002	245,919	215,530	68.30%	58.83%	47.37%	35.88%	27.66%
Black or African American alone (NH)	18,444	24,791	36,139	48,540	56,898	5.31%	5.16%	6.41%	7.08%	7.30%
Native American or Alaska Native alone (NH)	3,457	3,807	3,531	3,179	3,135	1.00%	0.79%	0.63%	0.46%	0.40%
Asian alone (NH)	19,888	55,774	62,126	94,547	134,684	5.73%	11.60%	11.02%	13.80%	17.28%
Native Hawaiian or Pacific Islander alone (NH)	x	x	1,624	3,248	4,977	0.29%	0.47%	0.29%	0.47%	0.64%
Other race alone (NH)	1,755	817	1,225	1,383	4,192	0.51%	0.17%	0.22%	0.20%	0.54%
Mixed race or Multiracial (NH)	x	x	19,878	22,149	34,092	x	x	3.53%	3.23%	4.38%
Hispanic or Latino (any race)	66,565	112,673	172,073	266,341	325,725	19.16%	23.44%	30.53%	38.86%	41.80%
Total	347,342	480,628	563,598	685,306	779,233	100.00%	100.00%	100.00%	100.00%	100.00%

=== American Community Survey 2025 data ===
The United States Census Bureau estimated that in 2025, San Joaquin County’s population was 823.815. It was also estimated that the county's population was 23,83% Non-Hispanic White, 43,49% Hispanic or Latino, 6,91% Non-Hispanic Black, 20,61% Asian, 0,39% Native American, 0,70% Pacific Islander, and 4,07% Multiracial.

Total	Population	Percentage
Non-Hispanic White	196.315	23,83%
Hispanic or Latino	358.247	43,49%
Non-Hispanic Black	56.928	6,91%
Asian	169.793	20,61%
Native American	3.221	0,39%
Pacific Islander	5.781	0,70%
Non-Hispanic Multiracial	33.530	4,07%

=== 2010 census ===
The 2010 United States census reported that San Joaquin County had a population of 685,306. The racial makeup of San Joaquin County was 349,287 (51.0%) White, 51,744 (7.6%) African American, 7,196 (1.1%) Native American, 98,472 (14.4%) Asian, 3,758 (0.5%) Pacific Islander, 131,054 (19.1%) from other races, and 43,795 (6.4%) from two or more races. Hispanic or Latino of any race were 266,341 persons (38.9%). The Filipino-American population at 46,447 comprised 47% of all Asian Americans in San Joaquin County, and as of 1990 have been the largest population of Asian Americans in the county.

Population reported at 2010 United States census
The County	Total; Population	White	African; American	Native; American	Asian	Pacific; Islander	other races	two or more races	Hispanic or Latino (of any race)
San Joaquin County	685,306	349,287	51,744	7,196	98,472	3,758	131,054	43,795	266,341
Incorporated cities	Total; Population	White	African; American	Native; American	Asian	Pacific; Islander	other races	two or more races	Hispanic or Latino (of any race)
Escalon	7,132	5,823	30	80	96	22	823	258	1,928
Lathrop	18,023	7,410	1,300	231	3,968	144	3,735	1,235	7,674
Lodi	62,134	42,662	517	560	4,293	105	11,164	2,833	22,613
Manteca	67,096	41,840	2,869	735	4,780	384	11,648	4,840	25,317
Ripon	14,297	11,392	221	125	599	36	1,208	716	3,177
Stockton	291,707	108,044	35,548	3,086	62,716	1,822	60,332	20,159	117,590
Tracy	82,922	43,724	5,953	715	12,229	747	13,173	6,381	30,557
Census-designated places	Total; Population	White	African; American	Native; American	Asian	Pacific; Islander	other races	two or more races	Hispanic or Latino (of any race)
Acampo	341	169	0	1	3	8	136	24	199
August	8,390	3,914	224	183	358	20	3,110	581	5,897
Collierville	1,934	1,552	14	21	49	1	229	68	518
Country Club	9,379	5,744	472	159	628	42	1,537	797	3,790
Dogtown	2,506	2,040	15	23	57	2	253	116	638
Farmington	207	164	7	1	6	0	18	11	42
French Camp	3,376	1,678	410	31	163	11	920	163	1,748
Garden Acres	10,648	5,244	233	172	358	40	3,908	693	7,338
Kennedy	3,254	517	200	23	258	4	2,109	143	2,513
Lincoln Village	4,381	2,971	154	58	269	13	536	380	1,422
Linden	1,784	1,541	6	10	25	1	127	74	385
Lockeford	3,233	2,526	10	22	64	13	413	185	956
Morada	3,828	2,848	47	28	412	30	263	200	676
Mountain House	9,675	3,467	903	45	3,830	71	663	696	1,637
Peters	672	532	7	15	20	0	60	38	153
Taft Mosswood	1,530	443	192	10	183	1	617	84	1,099
Terminous	381	338	2	6	7	0	13	15	40
Thornton	1,131	554	43	3	45	1	443	42	770
Victor	293	177	0	7	19	0	79	11	150
Waterloo	572	450	0	5	21	1	77	18	152
Woodbridge	3,984	2,997	15	46	201	7	582	136	1,234
Other unincorporated areas	Total; Population	White	African; American	Native; American	Asian	Pacific; Islander	other races	two or more races	Hispanic or Latino (of any race)
All others not CDPs (combined)	70,496	48,526	2,352	795	2,815	232	12,878	2,898	26,128

=== 2000 ===
As of the census of 2000, there were 563,598 people, 181,629 households, and 134,768 families residing in the county. The population density was 403 people per square mile (156 people/km^{2}). There were 189,160 housing units at an average density of 135 units per square mile (52 units/km^{2}). The racial makeup of the county was 58.1% White, 6.7% Black or African American, 1.1% Native American, 11.4% Asian, 0.4% Pacific Islander, 16.3% from other races, and 6.1% from two or more races. 30.5% of the population were Hispanic or Latino of any race. 9.3% were of German, 5.3% Irish and 5.0% English ancestry according to Census 2000. 66.4% spoke English, 21.3% Spanish, 2.2% Tagalog, 1.8% Mon-Khmer or Cambodian, 1.1% Vietnamese and 1.1% Hmong as their first language.

There were 181,629 households, out of which 40.5% had children under the age of 18 living with them, 54.3% were married couples living together, 14.0% had a female householder with no husband present, and 25.8% were non-families. 20.7% of all households were made up of individuals, and 8.4% had someone living alone who was 65 years of age or older. The average household size was 3.00 and the average family size was 3.48.

In the county, the population was spread out, with 31.0% under the age of 18, 10.0% from 18 to 24, 28.8% from 25 to 44, 19.6% from 45 to 64, and 10.6% who were 65 years of age or older. The median age was 32 years. For every 100 females there were 99.9 males. For every 100 females age 18 and over, there were 97.2 males.

The median income for a household in the county was $41,282, and the median income for a family was $46,919. Males had a median income of $39,246 versus $27,507 for females. The per capita income for the county was $17,365. About 13.5% of families and 17.7% of the population were below the poverty line, including 23.7% of those under age 18 and 10.0% of those age 65 or over.

== Metropolitan statistical area ==
The United States Office of Management and Budget has designated San Joaquin County as the Stockton–Lodi, CA Metropolitan Statistical Area. The United States Census Bureau ranked the Stockton–Lodi, CA Metropolitan Statistical Area as the 77th most populous metropolitan statistical area of the United States as of July 1, 2012.

The Office of Management and Budget has further designated the Stockton–Lodi, CA Metropolitan Statistical Area as a component of the more extensive San Jose–San Francisco–Oakland, CA Combined Statistical Area, the 5th most populous combined statistical area and primary statistical area of the United States as of July 1, 2012.

== Government and policing ==
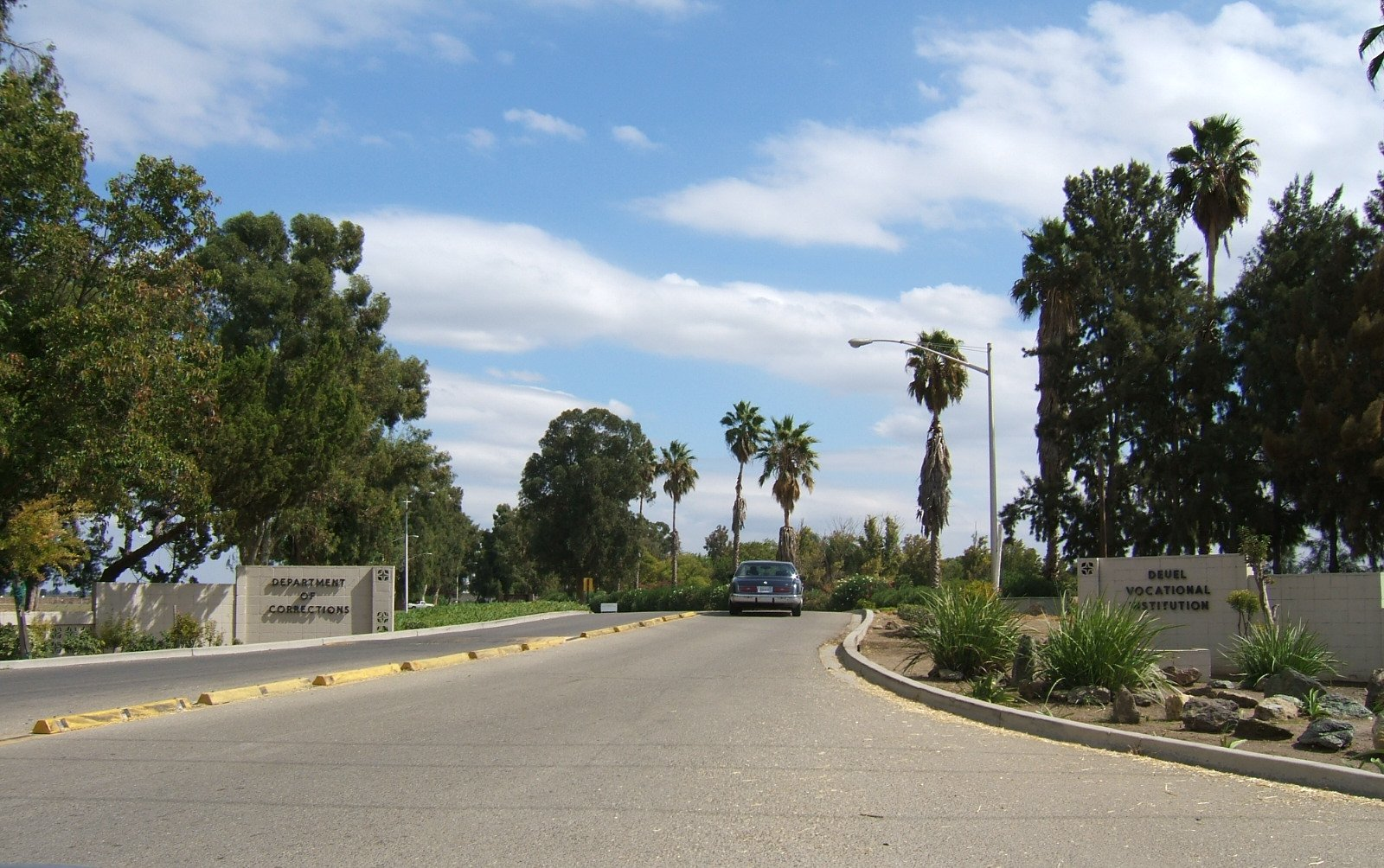
Deuel Vocational Institution

=== County government ===
The Government of San Joaquin County is defined and authorized under the California Constitution and law as a general law county. Much of the government of California is in practice the responsibility of county governments, such as the Government of San Joaquin County. The County government provides countywide services such as elections and voter registration, law enforcement, jails, vital records, property records, tax collection, public health, and social services. In addition the County serves as the local government for all unincorporated areas. Some chartered cities such as Stockton and Tracy provide their own municipal services such as police, public safety, libraries, parks and recreation, and zoning. Some other cities arrange to have the County provide some or all of these services on a contract basis.

The County government is composed of the elected five-member four-year-term board of supervisors (BOS), which operates in a legislative, executive, and quasi-judicial capacity; several other elected offices including the Sheriff, District Attorney, and Assessor; and numerous county departments and entities under the supervision of the county administrator.

As of February 2025, the supervisors are:

- Mario Gardea (District 1),
- Paul Canepa (District 2 and Chair),
- Sonny Dhaliwal (District 3 and Vice Chair),
- Steven J. Ding (District 4), and
- Robert Rickman (District 5).

In addition, several entities of the government of California have jurisdiction conterminous with San Joaquin County, such as the San Joaquin County Superior Court, and the California Department of Corrections and Rehabilitation operates the Deuel Vocational Institution, a state prison in unincorporated San Joaquin County near Tracy.

=== Policing ===
The San Joaquin County sheriff provides court protection and jail administration for the entire county. It provides patrol and detective services for the unincorporated areas of the county. Municipalities within the county that have municipal police departments are: Stockton, 310,000; Tracy, 89,000; Manteca, 77,000; Lodi, 65,000; Lathrop, 23,000 (sheriff contract); Ripon, 17,000; Escalon, 7,200,

== Politics ==
=== Voter registration ===
Population and registered voters
Total population	800,965	
Registered voters (Note: Percentage of registered voters with respect to total population. Percentages of party members with respect to registered voters follow.)	385,393	48.1%
Democratic	162,012	42.0%
Republican	114,880	29.8%
Democratic–Republican spread	+47,132	+12.2%
Independent	16,817	4.4%
Green	1,444	0.4%
Libertarian	4,066	1.1%
Peace and Freedom	2,860	0.7%
Other	2,576	0.7%
No party preference	79,111	20.5%

==== Cities by population and voter registration ====
City	Population	Registered voters	Democratic	Republican	D–R spread	Other	No party preference
Escalon	7,355	61.3%	25.0%	52.2%	-27.2%	8.0%	14.8%
Lathrop	39,857	43.2%	45.8%	22.2%	+23.6%	7.1%	24.9%
Lodi	67,679	45.5%	32.3%	41.0%	-8.7%	8.2%	18.5%
Manteca	91,059	52.9%	40.3%	30.9%	+9.4%	8.1%	20.7%
Mountain House	24,499	43.2%	46.8%	18.3%	+28.5%	5.7%	29.2%
Ripon	16,068	64.0%	22.9%	52.3%	-29.4%	7.9%	16.9%
Stockton	319,543	44.5%	49.1%	22.3%	+26.8%	7.6%	21.0%
Tracy	98,010	50.9%	46.0%	24.3%	+21.7%	7.5%	22.2%

=== Overview ===
In the United States House of Representatives, San Joaquin County is split between California's 9th and 13th congressional districts, represented by Josh Harder (D–Tracy) and Adam Gray (D–Merced), respectively.

In the California State Assembly, San Joaquin County is split between 2 legislative districts:

- the 9th Assembly district, represented by Republican Heath Flora, and
- the 13th Assembly district, represented by Democrat Rhodesia Ransom.

In the California State Senate, San Joaquin County is in the 5th senatorial district, represented by Democrat Jerry McNerney.

On November 4, 2008, San Joaquin County voted 65.5% in favor of Proposition 8 which amended the California Constitution to ban same-sex marriages.

For most of its history, San Joaquin County has been a Republican-leaning swing county, voting for the national winner in all but four presidential elections (1884, 1948, 1960, and 1976) from 1880 to 2012. In 2016, Hillary Clinton became the first Democratic nominee who lost nationally to win the county, and she did so by a sizable margin of around 14 points. Conversely, Donald Trump posted the worst result in county history for a national Republican Electoral College winner, being held to under 40% of the vote. In 2020, Trump improved his standing from 2016 but still had fewer votes than the winner of the election, Joe Biden. However, in 2024, Trump was able to flip the county back to the Republican column, marking the first time the county would vote Republican in 20 years.

United States presidential election results for San Joaquin County, California
Year	Republican		Democratic		Third party(ies)	
Year	No.	%	No.	%	No.	%
1880	2,568	51.51%	2,409	48.32%	8	0.16%
1884	3,079	50.32%	2,898	47.36%	142	2.32%
1888	2,829	47.30%	2,822	47.18%	330	5.52%
1892	2,958	42.08%	3,106	44.19%	965	13.73%
1896	3,500	48.83%	3,500	48.83%	167	2.33%
1900	3,318	52.01%	2,873	45.04%	188	2.95%
1904	4,498	61.65%	2,293	31.43%	505	6.92%
1908	4,470	52.20%	3,331	38.90%	763	8.91%
1912	35	0.25%	7,969	58.00%	5,735	41.74%
1916	7,861	38.05%	11,454	55.44%	1,346	6.51%
1920	12,003	60.94%	6,487	32.93%	1,208	6.13%
1924	11,056	48.91%	2,397	10.60%	9,154	40.49%
1928	16,695	61.10%	10,343	37.85%	288	1.05%
1932	11,145	32.19%	21,929	63.33%	1,552	4.48%
1936	10,172	25.61%	29,078	73.20%	473	1.19%
1940	23,403	46.34%	26,536	52.55%	559	1.11%
1944	24,357	47.21%	27,074	52.48%	157	0.30%
1948	29,135	49.08%	27,908	47.01%	2,318	3.90%
1952	45,512	55.82%	35,432	43.46%	587	0.72%
1956	44,491	54.52%	36,941	45.27%	168	0.21%
1960	48,441	52.85%	42,855	46.76%	361	0.39%
1964	36,546	38.13%	59,210	61.78%	83	0.09%
1968	47,293	47.97%	42,073	42.68%	9,223	9.35%
1972	61,646	55.30%	44,062	39.53%	5,761	5.17%
1976	50,277	49.60%	48,733	48.08%	2,351	2.32%
1980	64,718	55.38%	41,551	35.56%	10,594	9.07%
1984	81,795	59.61%	53,846	39.24%	1,572	1.15%
1988	75,309	54.39%	61,699	44.56%	1,445	1.04%
1992	58,355	37.84%	63,655	41.28%	32,200	20.88%
1996	65,131	44.87%	67,253	46.34%	12,756	8.79%
2000	81,773	48.90%	79,776	47.70%	5,690	3.40%
2004	100,978	53.18%	87,012	45.83%	1,874	0.99%
2008	91,607	43.76%	113,974	54.44%	3,768	1.80%
2012	86,071	42.05%	114,121	55.75%	4,505	2.20%
2016	88,936	39.67%	121,124	54.03%	14,106	6.29%
2020	121,098	41.98%	161,137	55.85%	6,257	2.17%
2024	128,996	48.92%	126,647	48.03%	8,066	3.06%

== Crime ==
=== County crime ===
Number of incidents reported and crime rate per 1,000 persons for each type:

Population and crime rates (2009)
Population	680,277	
Violent crime	5,531	8.13
Homicide	51	0.07
Forcible rape	148	0.22
Robbery	1,759	2.59
Aggravated assault	3,573	5.25
Property crime	16,971	24.95
Burglary	7,521	11.06
Larceny-theft	17,218	25.31
Motor vehicle theft	3,991	5.87
Arson	121	0.18

=== Cities crime ===
City population and crime rate (2012)
City	Population	Violent crimes	Violent crime rate per 1,000 persons	Property crimes	Property crime rate per 1,000 persons
Escalon	7,314	24	3.28	227	31.04
Lodi	63,718	280	4.39	2,599	40.79
Manteca	68,887	265	3.85	2,681	38.92
Ripon	14,662	6	0.41	297	20.26
Stockton	299,105	4,630	15.48	15,258	51.01
Tracy	85,047	145	1.70	2,158	25.37

== Economy ==
=== Agriculture ===
As of 2018, the gross value of agricultural production in the county was $2.6 billion. The top product was almonds, followed by grapes, milk, and walnuts.

San Joaquin County is home to one of the largest walnut processing facilities in the world, DeRuosi Nut. DeRuosi Nut is also a major handler of the Livermore variety of red walnuts, a cultivar developed in the San Joaquin Valley. Another large company, Pacific State Bancorp (PSBC), was based there; its only bank subsidiary, Pacific State Bank, was closed by the California Department of Financial Institutions on August 20, 2010.

=== Business and industry ===
San Joaquin County is home to several large manufacturing, general services, and agricultural companies, including Archer Daniels Midland, Blue Shield of California, Dart Container, Holz Rubber Company, Kubota Tractors, Lodi Iron Works, Miller Packing Company, Pacific Coast Producers, Tiger Lines, Valley Industries, and Woodbridge-Robert Mondavi.

As of 2019, about 260,000 people were employed in the county, with nearly 200,000 employed in private industry and about 44,500 employed in government.

As of 2013, the goods movement industry is also an important part of the local economy, with an Amazon fulfillment center in Tracy and the Port of Stockton.

== Education ==
San Joaquin County is home to 18 public school districts, and numerous private schools.

K-12:

- Banta Unified School District
  - It became a unified school district (that is, began to cover up to grade 12) in 2021.
- Escalon Unified School District
- Lammersville Joint Unified School District
- Lincoln Unified School District
- Linden Unified School District
- Lodi Unified School District
- Manteca Unified School District
- Ripon Unified School District
- Stockton Unified School District
- Tracy Unified School District - Covers some areas for K-12 and some (Jefferson and New Jerusalem elementary school districts) for 9–12 only. Prior to the 2021 unification of Banta USD, it also covered that area for high school only.

Secondary:

- Galt Joint Union High School District
- Oakdale Joint Unified School District (while it is a unified school district, it only covers 9–12 in its sections in this county)

Elementary:

- Galt Joint Union Elementary School District
- Jefferson Elementary School District
- New Hope Elementary School District
- New Jerusalem Elementary School District
- Oak View Union Elementary School District
- Valley Home Joint Elementary School District

School districts include:

District Name	Enrollment	Lang Arts Performance	Math Performance
Escalon Unified	3,140	49.4%	46.0%
Lincoln Unified	8,712	50.9%	51.3%
Linden Unified	2,758	44.4%	45.9%
Lodi Unified	31,266	38.0%	43.1%
Manteca Unified	23,643	42.7%	42.4%
Ripon Unified	3,014	58.3%	60.3%
Stockton Unified	38,617	29.1%	38.2%
Tracy Unified	17,375	44.3%	41.2%
	Averages for all Districts	45.5%	48.5%

On June 8, 2010, Lammersville Unified School District was approved in Mountain House.

The San Joaquin Delta Community College District is composed of San Joaquin Delta College located in Stockton and covers San Joaquin County as well as Rio Vista in Solano County, Galt in Sacramento County, and a large portion of Calaveras County.

A private university, the University of the Pacific, has its main campus in Stockton.

== Media ==
San Joaquin County is in the Sacramento television market, and thus receives Sacramento media.

The Record, The Manteca Bulletin, and The Lodi News-Sentinel are daily newspapers. Bilingual Weekly News publishes a weekly newspaper in both Spanish and English. Tracy Press also publishes a weekly newspaper.

Big Monkey Group publishes four Stockton magazines: Weston Ranch Monthly, Brookside Monthly, Spanos Park Monthly and On the Mile. Caravan is a local community arts and events monthly tabloid. The Central Valley Business Journal is a monthly business tabloid. Karima Magazine is a popular/consumer magazine covering the Central Valley as well as newsworthy events in the Bay Area. San Joaquin Magazine is a regional lifestyle magazine covering Stockton, Lodi, Tracy, and Manteca. The Downtowner is a free monthly guide to downtown Stockton's events, commerce, real estate, and other cultural and community happenings.

Poets' Espresso Review is a periodical that has been based in Stockton, mostly distributed by mail, since summer of 2005. Artifact is a San Joaquin Delta College periodical based in Stockton since December 2006, featuring writing in all genres, photography, and visual media by students, staff and faculty as well as community members. The Pacifican, University of the Pacific's newspaper since 1908 features News, Opinion, Lifestyles, and Sports pertinent to the Pacific campus and surrounding Stockton community.

== In popular culture ==
The television show Sons of Anarchy was set in Charming, California, a fictional town in San Joaquin County.

== Transportation ==
=== Major highways ===
- I-5
- I-205
  - I-205 BL (Tracy) – unsigned
- I-580
- SR 4
- SR 12
- SR 26
- SR 33
- SR 88
- SR 99 – former US 99
- SR 120
- SR 132

=== Public transportation ===
San Joaquin Regional Transit District provides city bus service within Stockton. RTD also runs intercity routes throughout the county, and subscription commuter routes to Livermore, Pleasanton, Sacramento, and Santa Clara County.

The cities of Lodi, Escalon, Manteca, Tracy and Ripon operate their own bus systems.

=== Train and bus service ===
Greyhound buses and Amtrak trains both stop in Stockton. Amtrak's Oakland-Stockton-Fresno-Bakersfield Gold Runner trains stop at the San Joaquin Street station. This is the former Santa Fe Railroad station in Stockton. Amtrak's Sacramento-Stockton-Fresno- Bakersfield Gold Runner trains stop at the Robert J. Cabral Station which is also used by Altamont Corridor Express trains to San Jose which originate in Stockton. This is the former Southern Pacific Railroad station in Stockton. RTD Hopper is a public bus service operated by San Joaquin Regional Transit connecting Stockton to Ripon, Manteca, Tracy, Lodi, and Lathrop.

=== Airports ===
Stockton Metropolitan Airport features passenger service on Allegiant Air to Las Vegas, Phoenix, and Denver. The airport also has cargo service and general aviation. Other general aviation airports in the county include Lodi Airport, Tracy Municipal Airport, and New Jerusalem Airport.

=== Port ===
The Port of Stockton is a major inland deepwater port in Stockton, California, located on the San Joaquin River before it joins the Sacramento River to empty into Suisun Bay, eighty miles (130 km) inland. The port sits on about 4,200 acres (17 km^{2}), and occupies an island in the Sacramento–San Joaquin River Delta.

== Communities ==
=== Cities ===
- Escalon
- Lathrop
- Lodi
- Manteca
- Mountain House
- Ripon
- Stockton (county seat)
- Tracy

=== Census-designated places ===
- Acampo
- August
- Collierville
- Country Club
- Dogtown
- Farmington
- French Camp
- Garden Acres
- Kennedy
- Lincoln Village
- Linden
- Lockeford
- Morada
- Peters
- Taft Mosswood
- Terminous
- Thornton
- Victor
- Waterloo
- Woodbridge

=== Unincorporated communities ===
- Atlanta
- Banta
- Clements
- Mormon
- Vernalis
- Youngstown

=== Population ranking ===
The population ranking of the following table is based on the 2020 census of San Joaquin County.

† county seat

Rank	City/Town/etc.	Municipal type	Population (2020 census)
1	† Stockton	City	320,804
2	Tracy	City	93,000
3	Manteca	City	83,498
4	Lodi	City	66,348
5	Lathrop	City	28,701
6	Mountain House	City	24,499
7	Ripon	City	16,013
8	Garden Acres	CDP	11,398
9	Country Club	CDP	10,777
10	August	CDP	8,628
11	Escalon	City	7,472
12	Lincoln Village	CDP	4,401
13	Morada	CDP	4,054
14	Woodbridge	CDP	4,031
15	French Camp	CDP	3,770
16	Lockeford	CDP	3,521
17	Kennedy	CDP	3,223
18	Dogtown	CDP	2,516
19	Collierville	CDP	2,094
20	Linden	CDP	1,863
21	Taft Mosswood	CDP	1,636
22	Thornton	CDP	1,004
23	Peters	CDP	708
24	Waterloo	CDP	534
25	Terminous	CDP	429
26	Acampo	CDP	334
27	Victor	CDP	313
28	Farmington	CDP	220

== See also ==
- Conergy
- Irrigation district
- List of museums in the San Joaquin Valley
- List of school districts in San Joaquin County, California
- National Register of Historic Places listings in San Joaquin County, California
- San Joaquin County Historical Society and Museum
