= Lincoln Village, California =

Lincoln Village
- census-designated place
- Location in San Joaquin County and the state of California

- Location in the United States
- Coordinates: 38°0′15″N 121°20′4″W
- Country: United States
- State: California
- County: San Joaquin

Government
  - State Senate: Jerry McNerney (D)
  - Assembly: Rhodesia Ransom (D)
  - U. S. Congress: Josh Harder (D)

Area
  - Total: 0.735 sq mi (1.904 km^{2})
  - Land: 0.735 sq mi (1.904 km^{2})
  - Water: 0 sq mi (0 km^{2}) 0%
- Elevation: 13 ft (4 m)

Population (2020)
  - Total: 4,401
  - Density: 5,987/sq mi (2,311/km^{2})
- Time zone: UTC-8 (PST)
  - Summer (DST): UTC-7 (PDT)
- ZIP code: 95207
- Area code: 209
- FIPS code: 06-41558
- GNIS feature ID: 1658962

Lincoln Village is a census-designated place (CDP) in San Joaquin County, California, United States. The population was 4,401 at the 2020 census.

== Geography ==
Lincoln Village is located at 38°0′15″N 121°20′4″W (38.004122, -121.334544).

According to the United States Census Bureau, the CDP has a total area of 0.73 square miles (1.9 km^{2}), all of it land.

=== Climate ===
According to the Köppen Climate Classification system, Lincoln Village has a warm-summer Mediterranean climate, abbreviated "Csa" on climate maps.

== Demographics ==
Historical population
Census	Pop.	Note	%±
1970	6,722		—
1980	6,476		−3.7%
1990	4,236		−34.6%
2000	4,216		−0.5%
2010	4,381		3.9%
2020	4,401		0.5%
U.S. Decennial Census; 1860–1870 1880-1890; 1900 1910 1920; 1930 1940 1950; 1960 1970 1980; 1990 2000 2010

Lincoln Village first appeared as an unincorporated community in the 1970 U.S. census; and as a census-designated place in the 1980 United States census.

=== 2020 census ===
As of the 2020 census, Lincoln Village had a population of 4,401 and a population density of 5,987.8 inhabitants per square mile (2,311.9/km^{2}). The median age was 37.7 years. The age distribution was 24.7% under the age of 18, 9.0% aged 18 to 24, 25.5% aged 25 to 44, 24.6% aged 45 to 64, and 16.1% aged 65 or older. For every 100 females, there were 93.4 males, and for every 100 females age 18 and over, there were 89.3 males age 18 and over.

Racial composition as of the 2020 census
Race	Number	Percent
White	2,165	49.2%
Black or African American	229	5.2%
American Indian and Alaska Native	57	1.3%
Asian	362	8.2%
Native Hawaiian and Other Pacific Islander	18	0.4%
Some other race	823	18.7%
Two or more races	747	17.0%

The census reported that 4,387 people (99.7%) lived in households, 14 people (0.3%) lived in non-institutionalized group quarters, and no one was institutionalized. There were 1,555 households, of which 38.3% had children under age 18. Of all households, 44.7% were married-couple households, 9.2% were cohabiting couple households, 29.9% had a female householder with no spouse or partner present, and 16.2% had a male householder with no spouse or partner present. About 21.9% of households were one person, and 11.1% were one person aged 65 or older. The average household size was 2.82. There were 1,133 families (72.9% of all households).

There were 1,608 housing units, of which 1,555 (96.7%) were occupied and 53 (3.3%) were vacant. The homeowner vacancy rate was 1.3%, and the rental vacancy rate was 3.6%. Of occupied units, 70.9% were owner-occupied and 29.1% were renter-occupied. 100.0% of residents lived in urban areas, while 0.0% lived in rural areas.

=== Income and poverty ===
In 2023, the US Census Bureau estimated that the median household income was $88,305, and the per capita income was $48,396. About 6.3% of families and 10.5% of the population were below the poverty line.

=== 2010 census ===
The 2010 United States census reported that Lincoln Village had a population of 4,381. The population density was 5,952.8 inhabitants per square mile (2,298.4/km^{2}). The racial makeup of Lincoln Village was 2,971 (67.8%) White, 154 (3.5%) African American, 58 (1.3%) Native American, 269 (6.1%) Asian, 13 (0.3%) Pacific Islander, 536 (12.2%) from other races, and 380 (8.7%) from two or more races. Hispanic or Latino of any race were 1,422 persons (32.5%).

The Census reported that 4,371 people (99.8% of the population) lived in households, 10 (0.2%) lived in non-institutionalized group quarters, and 0 (0%) were institutionalized.

There were 1,565 households, out of which 613 (39.2%) had children under the age of 18 living in them, 750 (47.9%) were opposite-sex married couples living together, 291 (18.6%) had a female householder with no husband present, 101 (6.5%) had a male householder with no wife present. There were 113 (7.2%) unmarried opposite-sex partnerships, and 9 (0.6%) same-sex married couples or partnerships. 329 households (21.0%) were made up of individuals, and 149 (9.5%) had someone living alone who was 65 years of age or older. The average household size was 2.79. There were 1,142 families (73.0% of all households); the average family size was 3.25.

The population was spread out, with 1,224 people (27.9%) under the age of 18, 402 people (9.2%) aged 18 to 24, 1,060 people (24.2%) aged 25 to 44, 1,088 people (24.8%) aged 45 to 64, and 607 people (13.9%) who were 65 years of age or older. The median age was 36.2 years. For every 100 females, there were 90.9 males. For every 100 females age 18 and over, there were 86.9 males.

There were 1,671 housing units at an average density of 2,270.5 per square mile (876.6/km^{2}), of which 1,095 (70.0%) were owner-occupied, and 470 (30.0%) were occupied by renters. The homeowner vacancy rate was 2.1%; the rental vacancy rate was 10.6%. 2,807 people (64.1% of the population) lived in owner-occupied housing units and 1,564 people (35.7%) lived in rental housing units.

== Education ==
It is in the Lincoln Unified School District.
