= August, California =

August
- Census-designated place
- Location in San Joaquin County and the state of California

- Location in the United States
- Coordinates: 37°58′48″N 121°15′50″W
- Country: United States
- State: California
- County: San Joaquin

Government
  - State Senator: Jerry McNerney (D)
  - Assemblymember: Rhodesia Ransom (D)
  - U. S. Rep.: Josh Harder (D)

Area
  - Total: 1.25 sq mi (3.25 km^{2})
  - Land: 1.25 sq mi (3.25 km^{2})
  - Water: 0 sq mi (0.00 km^{2}) 0%
- Elevation: 26 ft (8 m)

Population (2020)
  - Total: 8,628
  - Density: 6,870.4/sq mi (2,652.67/km^{2})
- Time zone: UTC-8 (PST)
  - Summer (DST): UTC-7 (PDT)
- ZIP code: 95231
- Area code: 209
- FIPS code: 06-03209
- GNIS feature ID: 1866996

August is a census-designated place (CDP) in San Joaquin County, California, United States. The population was 8,628 at the 2020 census, up from 8,390 at the 2010 census.

== Geography ==
August is located at 37°58′48″N 121°15′50″W (37.979890, -121.263984).

According to the United States Census Bureau, the CDP has a total area of 1.3 square miles (3.4 km^{2}), all of it land.

== Demographics ==
Historical population
Census	Pop.	Note	%±
1970	6,735		—
1980	5,445		−19.2%
1990	6,376		17.1%
2000	7,808		22.5%
2010	8,390		7.5%
2020	8,628		2.8%
U.S. Decennial Census; 1860–1870 1880-1890; 1900 1910 1920; 1930 1940 1950; 1960 1970 1980; 1990 2000 2010; 2020

August first appeared as an unincorporated community in the 1970 U.S. census; and as a census-designated place in the 1980 United States census.

=== Racial and ethnic composition ===
August CDP, California – Racial and ethnic composition Note: the US Census treats Hispanic/Latino as an ethnic category. This table excludes Latinos from the racial categories and assigns them to a separate category. Hispanics/Latinos may be of any race.
Race / Ethnicity (NH = Non-Hispanic)	Pop 1980	Pop 1990	Pop 2000	Pop 2010	Pop 2020	% 1980	% 1990	% 2000	% 2010	% 2020
White alone (NH)	4,008	3,974	2,745	1,679	1,185	73.61%	62.33%	35.16%	20.01%	13.73%
Black or African American alone (NH)	4	60	71	190	223	0.07%	0.94%	0.91%	2.26%	2.58%
Native American or Alaska Native alone (NH)	129	145	117	81	48	2.37%	2.27%	1.50%	0.97%	0.56%
Asian alone (NH)	110	177	207	325	300	2.02%	2.78%	2.65%	3.87%	3.48%
Native Hawaiian or Pacific Islander alone (NH)	x	x	40	17	24	x	x	0.51%	0.20%	0.28%
Other race alone (NH)	0	17	11	3	28	0.00%	0.85%	0.14%	0.04%	0.32%
Mixed race or Multiracial (NH)	x	x	247	198	229	x	x	3.16%	2.36%	2.65%
Hispanic or Latino (any race)	1,194	2,003	4,370	5,897	6,591	21.93%	31.41%	55.97%	70.29%	76.39%
Total	5,445	6,376	7,808	8,390	8,628	100.00%	100.00%	100.00%	100.00%	100.00%

=== 2020 census ===
As of the 2020 census, August had a population of 8,628 and a population density of 6,869.4 inhabitants per square mile (2,652.3/km^{2}).

The age distribution was 31.3% under the age of 18, 10.7% aged 18 to 24, 28.3% aged 25 to 44, 21.3% aged 45 to 64, and 8.5% who were 65 years of age or older. The median age was 30.3 years. For every 100 females, there were 105.5 males, and for every 100 females age 18 and over there were 104.5 males age 18 and over.

The census reported that 99.5% of the population lived in households, 0.1% lived in non-institutionalized group quarters, and 0.5% were institutionalized. In addition, 100.0% of residents lived in urban areas and 0.0% lived in rural areas.

There were 2,455 households, of which 47.7% included children under the age of 18. Of all households, 43.5% were married-couple households, 10.4% were cohabiting couple households, 25.1% had a female householder with no spouse or partner present, and 21.0% had a male householder with no spouse or partner present. About 16.7% of households were made up of individuals, and 6.8% had someone living alone who was 65 years of age or older. The average household size was 3.5, and there were 1,892 families (77.1% of all households).

There were 2,589 housing units at an average density of 2,061.3 units per square mile (795.9 units/km^{2}), of which 2,455 (94.8%) were occupied. Of the occupied units, 46.5% were owner-occupied and 53.5% were occupied by renters. The homeowner vacancy rate was 2.1% and the rental vacancy rate was 3.7%.

Racial composition as of the 2020 census
Race	Number	Percent
White	2,021	23.4%
Black or African American	247	2.9%
American Indian and Alaska Native	266	3.1%
Asian	332	3.8%
Native Hawaiian and Other Pacific Islander	25	0.3%
Some other race	4,202	48.7%
Two or more races	1,535	17.8%

=== Income and poverty ===
In 2023, the US Census Bureau estimated that the median household income was $48,708, and the per capita income was $20,378. About 27.3% of families and 28.7% of the population were below the poverty line.

=== 2010 census ===
At the 2010 census August had a population of 8,390. The population density was 6,705.8 inhabitants per square mile (2,589.1/km^{2}). The racial makeup of August was 3,914 (46.7%) White, 224 (2.7%) African American, 183 (2.2%) Native American, 358 (4.3%) Asian, 20 (0.2%) Pacific Islander, 3,110 (37.1%) from other races, and 581 (6.9%) from two or more races. Hispanic or Latino of any race were 5,897 persons (70.3%).

The census reported that 8,287 people (98.8% of the population) lived in households, 10 (0.1%) lived in non-institutionalized group quarters, and 93 (1.1%) were institutionalized.

There were 2,298 households, 1,234 (53.7%) had children under the age of 18 living in them, 1,040 (45.3%) were opposite-sex married couples living together, 485 (21.1%) had a female householder with no husband present, 249 (10.8%) had a male householder with no wife present. There were 234 (10.2%) unmarried opposite-sex partnerships, and 28 (1.2%) same-sex married couples or partnerships. 391 households (17.0%) were one person and 134 (5.8%) had someone living alone who was 65 or older. The average household size was 3.61. There were 1,774 families (77.2% of households); the average family size was 4.01.

The age distribution was 2,852 people (34.0%) under the age of 18, 957 people (11.4%) aged 18 to 24, 2,385 people (28.4%) aged 25 to 44, 1,605 people (19.1%) aged 45 to 64, and 591 people (7.0%) who were 65 or older. The median age was 28.0 years. For every 100 females, there were 107.1 males. For every 100 females age 18 and over, there were 107.6 males.

There were 2,560 housing units at an average density of 2,046.1 per square mile, of the occupied units 1,148 (50.0%) were owner-occupied and 1,150 (50.0%) were rented. The homeowner vacancy rate was 3.6%; the rental vacancy rate was 10.7%. 3,966 people (47.3% of the population) lived in owner-occupied housing units and 4,321 people (51.5%) lived in rental housing units.

== Education ==
It is in the Stockton Unified School District.
