= Kennedy, California =

Kennedy
- Unincorporated Community; Census Designated Place
- Location in San Joaquin County and the state of California

- Location in the United States
- Coordinates: 37°55′54″N 121°15′6″W
- Country: United States
- State: California
- County: San Joaquin

Government
  - State Senator: Jerry McNerney (D)
  - Assemblymember: Rhodesia Ransom (D)
  - U. S. Congress: Josh Harder (D)

Area
  - Total: 1.212 sq mi (3.139 km^{2})
  - Land: 1.212 sq mi (3.139 km^{2})
  - Water: 0 sq mi (0 km^{2}) 0%
- Elevation: 23 ft (7 m)

Population (2020)
  - Total: 3,223
  - Density: 2,659/sq mi (1,027/km^{2})
- Time zone: UTC-8 (PST)
  - Summer (DST): UTC-7 (PDT)
- Area code: 209
- FIPS code: 06-38065
- GNIS feature ID: 1853396

Kennedy is a census-designated place (CDP) in San Joaquin County, California, United States. It is bordered on three sides by the city of Stockton. The population was 3,223 at the 2020 census, down from 3,254 at the 2010 census.

== Geography ==
Kennedy is located at 37°55′54″N 121°15′6″W (37.931774, -121.251802).

According to the United States Census Bureau, the CDP has a total area of 1.2 square miles (3.1 km^{2}), all of it land.

== Demographics ==
Historical population
Census	Pop.	Note	%±
2000	3,275		—
2010	3,254		−0.6%
2020	3,223		−1.0%
U.S. Decennial Census; 1860–1870 1880-1890; 1900 1910 1920; 1930 1940 1950; 1960 1970 1980; 1990 2000 2010

Kennedy first appeared as a census designated place in the 2000 U.S. census.

=== 2020 census ===
As of the 2020 census, Kennedy had a population of 3,223, with a population density of 2,659.2 inhabitants per square mile (1,026.7/km^{2}). The median age was 30.6 years. 31.4% of residents were under the age of 18, 10.7% were aged 18 to 24, 27.1% were aged 25 to 44, 20.3% were aged 45 to 64, and 10.5% were 65 years of age or older. For every 100 females, there were 100.8 males, and for every 100 females age 18 and over, there were 100.2 males age 18 and over.

The census reported that 99.4% of the population lived in households, 18 people (0.6%) lived in non-institutionalized group quarters, and no one was institutionalized. There were 856 households, of which 50.4% had children under the age of 18 living in them. Of all households, 47.2% were married-couple households, 6.9% were cohabiting couple households, 20.7% were households with a male householder and no spouse or partner present, and 25.2% were households with a female householder and no spouse or partner present. About 14.7% of households were made up of individuals, and 5.1% had someone living alone who was 65 years of age or older. The average household size was 3.74. There were 682 families (79.7% of all households).

There were 879 housing units, with 856 occupied (97.4%) and 23 vacant (2.6%). The average housing unit density was 725.2 units per square mile (280.0 units/km^{2}). Of occupied units, 51.4% were owner-occupied and 48.6% were occupied by renters. The homeowner vacancy rate was 0.0%, and the rental vacancy rate was 2.6%.

100.0% of residents lived in urban areas, while 0.0% lived in rural areas.

Racial composition as of the 2020 census
Race	Number	Percent
White	457	14.2%
Black or African American	219	6.8%
American Indian and Alaska Native	52	1.6%
Asian	306	9.5%
Native Hawaiian and Other Pacific Islander	5	0.2%
Some other race	1,490	46.2%
Two or more races	694	21.5%
Hispanic or Latino (of any race)	2,457	76.2%

=== Income and poverty ===
In 2023, the US Census Bureau estimated that the median household income was $58,859, and the per capita income was $21,098. About 21.0% of families and 20.5% of the population were below the poverty line.

=== 2010 census ===
The 2010 United States census reported that Kennedy had a population of 3,254. The population density was 2,769.3 inhabitants per square mile (1,069.2/km^{2}). The racial makeup of Kennedy was 517 (15.9%) White, 200 (6.1%) African American, 23 (0.7%) Native American, 258 (7.9%) Asian, 4 (0.1%) Pacific Islander, 2,109 (64.8%) from other races, and 143 (4.4%) from two or more races. Hispanic or Latino of any race were 2,513 persons (77.2%).

The Census reported that 3,230 people (99.3% of the population) lived in households, 24 (0.7%) lived in non-institutionalized group quarters, and 0 (0%) were institutionalized.

There were 768 households, out of which 460 (59.9%) had children under the age of 18 living in them, 392 (51.0%) were opposite-sex married couples living together, 169 (22.0%) had a female householder with no husband present, 89 (11.6%) had a male householder with no wife present. There were 55 (7.2%) unmarried opposite-sex partnerships, and 8 (1.0%) same-sex married couples or partnerships. 86 households (11.2%) were made up of individuals, and 41 (5.3%) had someone living alone who was 65 years of age or older. The average household size was 4.21. There were 650 families (84.6% of all households); the average family size was 4.47.

The population was spread out, with 1,178 people (36.2%) under the age of 18, 371 people (11.4%) aged 18 to 24, 847 people (26.0%) aged 25 to 44, 580 people (17.8%) aged 45 to 64, and 278 people (8.5%) who were 65 years of age or older. The median age was 26.8 years. For every 100 females, there were 102.0 males. For every 100 females age 18 and over, there were 103.1 males.

There were 853 housing units at an average density of 725.9 per square mile (280.3/km^{2}), of which 453 (59.0%) were owner-occupied, and 315 (41.0%) were occupied by renters. The homeowner vacancy rate was 1.9%; the rental vacancy rate was 7.3%. 1,806 people (55.5% of the population) lived in owner-occupied housing units and 1,424 people (43.8%) lived in rental housing units.

== Education ==
It is in the Stockton Unified School District.
