= Country Club, California =

Country Club
- census-designated place
- Interactive map of Country Club
- Location in the United States
- Coordinates: 37°58′15″N 121°20′6″W
- Country: United States
- State: California
- County: San Joaquin

Government
  - Senate: Jerry McNerney (D)
  - Assembly: Rhodesia Ransom (D)
  - U. S. Congress: Josh Harder (D)

Area
  - Total: 2.08 sq mi (5.40 km^{2})
  - Land: 1.92 sq mi (4.96 km^{2})
  - Water: 0.17 sq mi (0.44 km^{2}) 7.63%
- Elevation: 13 ft (4 m)

Population (2020)
  - Total: 10,777
  - Density: 5,622/sq mi (2,170.7/km^{2})
- Time zone: UTC-8 (PST)
  - Summer (DST): UTC-7 (PDT)
- ZIP code: 95204
- Area code: 209
- FIPS code: 06-16651
- GNIS feature ID: 1867009

Country Club is a census-designated place (CDP) in San Joaquin County, California, United States. The population was 10,777 at the 2020 census, up from 9,379 at the 2010 census. It comprises a county island within the City of Stockton.

== Geography ==
According to the United States Census Bureau, the CDP has a total area of 2.1 square miles (5.4 km^{2}), of which, 1.9 square miles (4.9 km^{2}) of it is land and 0.17 square miles (0.44 km^{2}) of it (8.12%) is water.

== Demographics ==
Historical population
Census	Pop.	Note	%±
1980	9,585		—
1990	9,325		−2.7%
2000	9,462		1.5%
2010	9,379		−0.9%
2020	10,777		14.9%
U.S. Decennial Census; 1860–1870 1880-1890; 1900 1910 1920; 1930 1940 1950; 1960 1970 1980; 1990 2000 2010

Country Club first appeared as a census designated place in the 1980 U.S. census.

=== 2020 census ===
As of the 2020 census, Country Club had a population of 10,777 and a population density of 5,621.8 inhabitants per square mile (2,170.6/km^{2}). The median age was 36.0 years. 25.7% of residents were under the age of 18, 7.9% were aged 18 to 24, 27.7% were aged 25 to 44, 23.4% were aged 45 to 64, and 15.3% were 65 years of age or older. For every 100 females there were 98.1 males, and for every 100 females age 18 and over there were 94.7 males age 18 and over.

The census reported that 99.6% of the population lived in households, 0.3% lived in non-institutionalized group quarters, and 0.1% were institutionalized. In addition, 100.0% of residents lived in urban areas, while 0.0% lived in rural areas.

There were 3,719 households, out of which 36.2% had children under the age of 18 living in them. Of all households, 42.8% were married-couple households, 9.1% were cohabiting couple households, 20.1% had a male householder with no spouse or partner present, and 28.0% had a female householder with no spouse or partner present. 22.7% of all households were made up of individuals, and 10.8% had someone living alone who was 65 years of age or older. The average household size was 2.89. There were 2,650 families (71.3% of all households).

There were 3,906 housing units at an average density of 2,037.6 units per square mile (786.7 units/km^{2}), of which 3,719 (95.2%) were occupied and 4.8% were vacant. Of the occupied units, 65.5% were owner-occupied and 34.5% were occupied by renters. The homeowner vacancy rate was 1.0% and the rental vacancy rate was 4.2%.

Racial composition as of the 2020 census
Race	Number	Percent
White	4,352	40.4%
Black or African American	606	5.6%
American Indian and Alaska Native	300	2.8%
Asian	752	7.0%
Native Hawaiian and Other Pacific Islander	63	0.6%
Some other race	2,851	26.5%
Two or more races	1,853	17.2%
Hispanic or Latino (of any race)	5,459	50.7%

=== Income and poverty ===
In 2023, the US Census Bureau estimated that the median household income was $96,679, and the per capita income was $44,293. About 5.4% of families and 8.4% of the population were below the poverty line.

=== 2010 census ===
The 2010 United States census reported that Country Club had a population of 9,379. The population density was 4,742.3 inhabitants per square mile (1,831.0/km^{2}). The racial makeup of Country Club was 5,744 (61.2%) White, 472 (5.0%) African American, 159 (1.7%) Native American, 628 (6.7%) Asian, 42 (0.4%) Pacific Islander, 1,537 (16.4%) from other races, and 797 (8.5%) from two or more races. Hispanic or Latino of any race were 3,790 persons (40.4%).

The Census reported that 9,364 people (99.8% of the population) lived in households, 15 (0.2%) lived in non-institutionalized group quarters, and 0 (0%) were institutionalized.

There were 3,463 households, out of which 1,222 (35.3%) had children under the age of 18 living in them, 1,498 (43.3%) were opposite-sex married couples living together, 614 (17.7%) had a female householder with no husband present, 243 (7.0%) had a male householder with no wife present. There were 267 (7.7%) unmarried opposite-sex partnerships, and 38 (1.1%) same-sex married couples or partnerships. 878 households (25.4%) were made up of individuals, and 388 (11.2%) had someone living alone who was 65 years of age or older. The average household size was 2.70. There were 2,355 families (68.0% of all households); the average family size was 3.22.

The population was spread out, with 2,424 people (25.8%) under the age of 18, 839 people (8.9%) aged 18 to 24, 2,345 people (25.0%) aged 25 to 44, 2,421 people (25.8%) aged 45 to 64, and 1,350 people (14.4%) who were 65 years of age or older. The median age was 36.9 years. For every 100 females, there were 92.7 males. For every 100 females age 18 and over, there were 89.0 males.

There were 3,770 housing units at an average density of 1,906.2 per square mile (736.0/km^{2}), of which 2,304 (66.5%) were owner-occupied, and 1,159 (33.5%) were occupied by renters. The homeowner vacancy rate was 2.7%; the rental vacancy rate was 8.5%. 5,715 people (60.9% of the population) lived in owner-occupied housing units and 3,649 people (38.9%) lived in rental housing units.

== Education ==
It is in the Stockton Unified School District.
