= Morada, California =

Morada
- census-designated place
- Location in San Joaquin County and the state of California

- Location in the United States
- Coordinates: 38°2′24″N 121°14′58″W
- Country: United States
- State: California
- County: San Joaquin

Government
  - State senator: Jerry McNerney (D)
  - Assemblymember: Heath Flora (R)
  - U. S. rep.: Josh Harder (D)

Area
  - Total: 2.988 sq mi (7.740 km^{2})
  - Land: 2.981 sq mi (7.721 km^{2})
  - Water: 0.0073 sq mi (0.019 km^{2}) 0.24%
- Elevation: 43 ft (13 m)

Population (2020)
  - Total: 4,054
  - Density: 1,360/sq mi (525.1/km^{2})
- Time zone: UTC-8 (PST)
  - Summer (DST): UTC-7 (PDT)
- ZIP code: 95212
- Area code: 209
- FIPS code: 06-49180
- GNIS feature ID: 1867042

Morada (Spanish for "Residence") is a census-designated place (CDP) in San Joaquin County, California, United States. It is adjacent to Stockton. The population was 4,054 at the 2020 census, up from 3,828 at the 2010 census.

== Geography ==
Morada is located at 38°2′24″N 121°14′58″W (38.039971, -121.249389).

According to the United States Census Bureau, the CDP has a total area of 3.0 square miles (7.8 km^{2}), 99.76% of it land and 0.24% of it water.

== Demographics ==
Historical population
Census	Pop.	Note	%±
1990	3,570		—
2000	3,726		4.4%
2010	3,828		2.7%
2020	4,054		5.9%
U.S. Decennial Census; 1860–1870 1880-1890; 1900 1910 1920; 1930 1940 1950; 1960 1970 1980; 1990 2000 2010

Morada first appeared as a census designated place in the 1990 U.S. census.

=== Racial and ethnic composition ===
Morada CDP, California – Racial and ethnic composition Note: the US Census treats Hispanic/Latino as an ethnic category. This table excludes Latinos from the racial categories and assigns them to a separate category. Hispanics/Latinos may be of any race.
Race / Ethnicity (NH = Non-Hispanic)	Pop 2000	Pop 2010	Pop 2020	% 2000	% 2010	% 2020
White alone (NH)	2,838	2,527	2,201	76.17%	66.01%	54.29%
Black or African American alone (NH)	25	45	53	0.67%	1.18%	1.31%
Native American or Alaska Native alone (NH)	21	17	15	0.56%	0.44%	0.37%
Asian alone (NH)	237	404	538	6.36%	10.55%	13.27%
Native Hawaiian or Pacific Islander alone (NH)	16	30	5	0.43%	0.78%	0.12%
Other race alone (NH)	5	8	22	0.13%	0.21%	0.54%
Mixed race or Multiracial (NH)	95	121	232	2.55%	3.16%	5.72%
Hispanic or Latino (any race)	489	676	988	13.12%	17.66%	24.37%
Total	3,726	3,828	4,054	100.00%	100.00%	100.00%

=== 2020 census ===
As of the 2020 census, Morada had a population of 4,054 and a population density of 1,359.9 inhabitants per square mile (525.1/km^{2}).

The median age was 48.6 years. The age distribution was 19.7% under the age of 18, 6.4% aged 18 to 24, 19.8% aged 25 to 44, 28.3% aged 45 to 64, and 25.8% who were 65 years of age or older. For every 100 females, there were 101.5 males, and for every 100 females age 18 and over there were 100.4 males age 18 and over.

The census reported that 99.7% of the population lived in households, 0.3% lived in non-institutionalized group quarters, and no one was institutionalized. In addition, 95.6% of residents lived in urban areas, while 4.4% lived in rural areas.

There were 1,458 households, out of which 26.5% had children under the age of 18 living in them. Of all households, 61.7% were married-couple households, 4.9% were cohabiting couple households, 19.6% had a female householder with no spouse or partner present, and 13.8% had a male householder with no spouse or partner present. About 18.6% of all households were made up of individuals, and 12.5% had someone living alone who was 65 years of age or older. The average household size was 2.77, and there were 1,110 families (76.1% of all households).

There were 1,528 housing units at an average density of 512.6 units per square mile (197.9 units/km^{2}), of which 1,458 (95.4%) were occupied. Of occupied units, 88.3% were owner-occupied and 11.7% were occupied by renters. Of all housing units, 4.6% were vacant. The homeowner vacancy rate was 1.3% and the rental vacancy rate was 3.4%.

Racial composition as of the 2020 census
Race	Number	Percent
White	2,404	59.3%
Black or African American	58	1.4%
American Indian and Alaska Native	39	1.0%
Asian	549	13.5%
Native Hawaiian and Other Pacific Islander	8	0.2%
Some other race	400	9.9%
Two or more races	596	14.7%

=== Income and poverty ===
In 2023, the US Census Bureau estimated that the median household income was $94,464, and the per capita income was $60,464. About 3.0% of families and 2.7% of the population were below the poverty line.

=== 2010 census ===
The 2010 United States census reported that Morada had a population of 3,828. The population density was 1,281.0 inhabitants per square mile (494.6/km^{2}). The racial makeup of Morada was 2,848 (74.4%) White, 47 (1.2%) African American, 28 (0.7%) Native American, 412 (10.8%) Asian, 30 (0.8%) Pacific Islander, 263 (6.9%) from other races, and 200 (5.2%) from two or more races. Hispanic or Latino of any race were 676 persons (17.7%).

The Census reported that 3,810 people (99.5% of the population) lived in households, none lived in non-institutionalized group quarters, and 18 (0.5%) were institutionalized.

There were 1,425 households, out of which 410 (28.8%) had children under the age of 18 living in them, 934 (65.5%) were opposite-sex married couples living together, 120 (8.4%) had a female householder with no husband present, 61 (4.3%) had a male householder with no wife present. There were 53 (3.7%) unmarried opposite-sex partnerships, and 8 (0.6%) same-sex married couples or partnerships. 265 households (18.6%) were made up of individuals, and 166 (11.6%) had someone living alone who was 65 years of age or older. The average household size was 2.67. There were 1,115 families (78.2% of all households); the average family size was 3.03.

The population was spread out, with 809 people (21.1%) under the age of 18, 259 people (6.8%) aged 18 to 24, 644 people (16.8%) aged 25 to 44, 1,315 people (34.4%) aged 45 to 64, and 801 people (20.9%) who were 65 years of age or older. The median age was 48.4 years. For every 100 females, there were 101.4 males. For every 100 females age 18 and over, there were 99.1 males.

There were 1,503 housing units at an average density of 502.9 per square mile (194.2/km^{2}), of which 1,270 (89.1%) were owner-occupied, and 155 (10.9%) were occupied by renters. The homeowner vacancy rate was (2.3%); the rental vacancy rate was (8.2%). 3,390 people (88.6% of the population) lived in owner-occupied housing units and 420 people (11.0%) lived in rental housing units.
