= Farmington, California =

Farmington
- Unincorporated Community; Census Designated Place
- Location in San Joaquin County and the state of California

- Location in the United States
- Coordinates: 37°55′47″N 120°59′58″W
- Country: California
- County: San Joaquin

Government
  - Senate: Jerry McNerney (D)
  - Assembly: Heath Flora (R)
  - U. S. Congress: Josh Harder (D)

Area
  - Total: 2.542 sq mi (6.584 km^{2})
  - Land: 2.542 sq mi (6.584 km^{2})
  - Water: 0 sq mi (0 km^{2}) 0%
- Elevation: 112 ft (34 m)

Population (2020)
  - Total: 220
  - Density: 87/sq mi (33/km^{2})
- Time zone: UTC-8 (Pacific (PST))
  - Summer (DST): UTC-7 (PDT)
- ZIP code: 95230
- Area code: 209
- FIPS code: 06-23630
- GNIS feature ID: 1656009

Farmington is a census-designated place (CDP) in San Joaquin County, California. The population was 220 at the 2020 census, up from 207 at the 2010 census.

== History ==
Farmington was so named to distinguish its agricultural setting from the nearby mining regions.

== Geography ==
Farmington is located at 37°55′47″N 120°59′58″W (37.929625, -120.999574). According to the United States Census Bureau, the CDP has a total area of 2.5 square miles (6.5 km^{2}), all of it land. Barren, low hills lie to the immediate east of the town, and farther east are the Sierra Nevada mountains. Stockton East Creek flows along the southern border of Farmington, paralleling Highway 4 for a short distance. The creek and many other places nearby were used as locations in the 1958 film The Big Country, as was scenes for the movie, Dirty Mary, Crazy Larry (1974).

== Demographics ==
Historical population
Census	Pop.	Note	%±
2000	262		—
2010	207		−21.0%
2020	220		6.3%
U.S. Decennial Census; 1860–1870 1880-1890; 1900 1910 1920; 1930 1940 1950; 1960 1970 1980; 1990 2000 2010

Farmington first appeared as a census designated place in the 2000 U.S. census.

=== 2020 ===
The 2020 United States census reported that Farmington had a population of 220. The population density was 86.5 inhabitants per square mile (33.4/km^{2}). The ethnic makeup of Farmington was 125 (56.8%) Non-Hispanic white, 9 (4.1%) from two or more races (not Hispanic or Latino), and 86 (39.1%) Hispanic or Latino.

The whole population lived in households. There were 89 households, out of which 30 (33.7%) had children under the age of 18 living in them, 41 (46.1%) were married-couple households, 8 (9.0%) were cohabiting couple households, 24 (27.0%) had a female householder with no partner present, and 16 (18.0%) had a male householder with no partner present. 23 households (25.8%) were one person, and 9 (10.1%) were one person aged 65 or older. The average household size was 2.47. There were 61 families (68.5% of all households).

The age distribution was 61 people (27.7%) under the age of 18, 16 people (7.3%) aged 18 to 24, 55 people (25.0%) aged 25 to 44, 44 people (20.0%) aged 45 to 64, and 44 people (20.0%) who were 65 years of age or older. The median age was 38.0 years. For every 100 females, there were 109.5 males.

There were 90 housing units at an average density of 35.4 units per square mile (13.7 units/km^{2}), of which 89 (98.9%) were occupied. Of these, 47 (52.8%) were owner-occupied, and 42 (47.2%) were occupied by renters.

=== 2010 ===
The 2010 United States census reported that Farmington had a population of 207. The population density was 81.4 inhabitants per square mile (31.4/km^{2}). The racial makeup of Farmington was 164 (79.2%) White, 7 (3.4%) African American, 1 (0.5%) Native American, 6 (2.9%) Asian, 0 (0.0%) Pacific Islander, 18 (8.7%) from other races, and 11 (5.3%) from two or more races. Hispanic or Latino of any race were 42 persons (20.3%).

The Census reported that 207 people (100% of the population) lived in households, 0 (0%) lived in non-institutionalized group quarters, and 0 (0%) were institutionalized.

There were 79 households, out of which 26 (32.9%) had children under the age of 18 living in them, 46 (58.2%) were opposite-sex married couples living together, 5 (6.3%) had a female householder with no husband present, 6 (7.6%) had a male householder with no wife present. There were 6 (7.6%) unmarried opposite-sex partnerships, and 0 (0%) same-sex married couples or partnerships. 14 households (17.7%) were made up of individuals, and 7 (8.9%) had someone living alone who was 65 years of age or older. The average household size was 2.62. There were 57 families (72.2% of all households); the average family size was 2.98.

The population was spread out, with 45 people (21.7%) under the age of 18, 13 people (6.3%) aged 18 to 24, 49 people (23.7%) aged 25 to 44, 73 people (35.3%) aged 45 to 64, and 27 people (13.0%) who were 65 years of age or older. The median age was 43.9 years. For every 100 females, there were 102.9 males. For every 100 females age 18 and over, there were 102.5 males.

There were 98 housing units at an average density of 38.6 per square mile (14.9/km^{2}), of which 54 (68.4%) were owner-occupied, and 25 (31.6%) were occupied by renters. The homeowner vacancy rate was 11.5%; the rental vacancy rate was 10.7%. 128 people (61.8% of the population) lived in owner-occupied housing units and 79 people (38.2%) lived in rental housing units.
