= Garden Acres, California =

Garden Acres
- census-designated place
- Interactive map of Garden Acres
- Location in the United States
- Coordinates: 37°57′41″N 121°13′53″W
- Country: United States
- State: California
- County: San Joaquin

Government
  - Assemblymember: Heath Flora (R)
  - State Senator: Jerry McNerney (D)
  - U. S. Congress: Josh Harder (D)

Area
  - Total: 2.585 sq mi (6.694 km^{2})
  - Land: 2.585 sq mi (6.694 km^{2})
  - Water: 0 sq mi (0 km^{2}) 0%
- Elevation: 33 ft (10 m)

Population (2020)
  - Total: 11,398
  - Density: 4,410/sq mi (1,703/km^{2})
- Time zone: UTC-8 (PST)
  - Summer (DST): UTC-7 (PDT)
- ZIP code: 95215
- Area code: 209
- FIPS code: 06-28182
- GNIS feature ID: 1867024

Garden Acres is a census-designated place (CDP) in San Joaquin County, California, United States. The population was 11,398 at the 2020 census, up from 10,648 at the 2010 census. It is the most populous CDP in San Joaquin County.

== Geography ==
Garden Acres is located at 37°57′41″N 121°13′53″W (37.961373, -121.231345).

According to the United States Census Bureau, the CDP has a total area of 2.6 square miles (6.7 km^{2}), all of it land.

The popular nickname of the community is Okieville. All of Okieville lies east of California Highway 99. Garden Acres is further subdivided; as north of Main Street is known as Bigville, and south of Main Street known as Littleville.

== Demographics ==
Historical population
Census	Pop.	Note	%±
1970	7,870		—
1980	7,361		−6.5%
1990	8,547		16.1%
2000	9,747		14.0%
2010	10,648		9.2%
2020	11,398		7.0%
U.S. Decennial Census; 1860–1870 1880-1890; 1900 1910 1920; 1930 1940 1950; 1960 1970 1980; 1990 2000 2010

Garden Acres first appeared as an unincorporated community in the 1970 U.S. census; and as a census-designated place in the 1980 United States census.

=== 2020 census ===
As of the 2020 census, Garden Acres had a population of 11,398. The population density was 4,411.0 inhabitants per square mile (1,703.1/km^{2}).

Racial composition as of the 2020 census
Race	Number	Percent
White	2,864	25.1%
Black or African American	191	1.7%
American Indian and Alaska Native	297	2.6%
Asian	272	2.4%
Native Hawaiian and Other Pacific Islander	15	0.1%
Some other race	5,715	50.1%
Two or more races	2,044	17.9%

99.7% of residents lived in urban areas, while 0.3% lived in rural areas. The census also reported that 99.6% of the population lived in households, 0.4% lived in non-institutionalized group quarters, and no one was institutionalized.

There were 2,986 households, out of which 50.4% had children under the age of 18 living in them. Of all households, 50.8% were married-couple households, 9.0% were cohabiting-couple households, 22.0% had a female householder with no spouse or partner present, and 18.2% had a male householder with no spouse or partner present. About 13.7% of households were one person, and 6.4% had one person aged 65 or older. The average household size was 3.8. There were 2,413 families (80.8% of all households).

The age distribution was 30.6% under the age of 18, 10.4% aged 18 to 24, 28.1% aged 25 to 44, 21.1% aged 45 to 64, and 9.8% aged 65 or older. The median age was 30.9 years. For every 100 females, there were 105.7 males, and for every 100 females age 18 and over, there were 102.5 males age 18 and over.

There were 3,095 housing units at an average density of 1,197.8 units per square mile (462.5 units/km^{2}), of which 2,986 (96.5%) were occupied and 3.5% were vacant. Of the occupied units, 57.5% were owner-occupied and 42.5% were occupied by renters. The homeowner vacancy rate was 0.4% and the rental vacancy rate was 2.9%.

=== Demographic estimates ===
In 2023, the US Census Bureau estimated that 38.8% of the population were foreign-born. Of all people aged 5 or older, 24.5% spoke only English at home, 73.2% spoke Spanish, 1.7% spoke Asian or Pacific Islander languages, and 0.6% spoke other languages. Of those aged 25 or older, 48.2% were high school graduates and 5.1% had a bachelor's degree.

=== Income and poverty ===
The median household income was $62,895, and the per capita income was $21,067. About 14.2% of families and 14.0% of the population were below the poverty line.

=== 2010 census ===
The 2010 United States census reported that Garden Acres had a population of 10,648. The population density was 4,113.4 inhabitants per square mile (1,588.2/km^{2}). The racial makeup of Garden Acres was 5,244 (49.2%) White, 233 (2.2%) African American, 172 (1.6%) Native American, 358 (3.4%) Asian, 40 (0.4%) Pacific Islander, 3,908 (36.7%) from other races, and 693 (6.5%) from two or more races. Hispanic or Latino of any race were 7,338 persons (68.9%). This however has changed. It has almost tripled in size.

The Census reported that 10,647 people (100% of the population) lived in households, 1 (0%) lived in non-institutionalized group quarters, and 0 (0%) were institutionalized.

There were 2,831 households, out of which 1,518 (53.6%) had children under the age of 18 living in them, 1,509 (53.3%) were opposite-sex married couples living together, 511 (18.1%) had a female householder with no husband present, 273 (9.6%) had a male householder with no wife present. There were 238 (8.4%) unmarried opposite-sex partnerships, and 15 (0.5%) same-sex married couples or partnerships. 412 households (14.6%) were made up of individuals, and 175 (6.2%) had someone living alone who was 65 years of age or older. The average household size was 3.76. There were 2,293 families (81.0% of all households); the average family size was 4.11.

The population was spread out, with 3,518 people (33.0%) under the age of 18, 1,216 people (11.4%) aged 18 to 24, 2,908 people (27.3%) aged 25 to 44, 2,158 people (20.3%) aged 45 to 64, and 848 people (8.0%) who were 65 years of age or older. The median age was 28.7 years. For every 100 females, there were 105.4 males. For every 100 females age 18 and over, there were 104.7 males.

There were 3,057 housing units at an average density of 1,180.9 per square mile (455.9/km^{2}), of which 1,604 (56.7%) were owner-occupied, and 1,227 (43.3%) were occupied by renters. The homeowner vacancy rate was 2.2%; the rental vacancy rate was 7.0%. 5,935 people (55.7% of the population) lived in owner-occupied housing units and 4,712 people (44.3%) lived in rental housing units.

== Education ==
It is in the Stockton Unified School District.
