= California's 9th congressional district =

U.S. House district for California

Coordinates: 38.0°N 121.3°W

- Interactive map of district boundaries
- Representative: Josh Harder; D–Tracy
- Population (2025): 788,423
- Median household income: $94,841
- Ethnicity: 41.5% Hispanic; 28.7% White; 16.5% Asian; 7.3% Black; 4.4% Two or more races; 1.5% other
- Cook PVI: D+1

California's 9th congressional district is a congressional district in the U.S. state of California. Josh Harder, a Democrat, has represented the district since January 2023.

Currently, the district includes most of San Joaquin County and small parts of neighboring Contra Costa County and Stanislaus County. It includes the cities of Stockton, Lodi, Tracy, Manteca, and Mountain House in San Joaquin County, and the census-designated place of Discovery Bay in Contra Costa County.

The district was one of 13 congressional districts that voted for Donald Trump in the 2024 presidential election while simultaneously electing a Democrat in the 2024 House of Representatives elections.

== Recent election results from statewide races ==
=== 2023–2027 boundaries ===
Year	Office	Results
2008	President	Obama 55% - 45%
2010	Governor	Brown 48% - 46%
2010	Lt. Governor	Maldonado 46% - 42%
2010	Secretary of State	Bowen 48% - 43%
2010	Attorney General	Cooley 49% - 41%
2010	Treasurer	Lockyer 51% - 41%
2010	Controller	Chiang 55% - 37%
2012	President	Obama 56% - 44%
2014	Governor	Brown 53% - 47%
2016	President	Clinton 54% - 41%
2018	Governor	Newsom 52% - 48%
2018	Attorney General	Becerra 54% - 46%
2020	President	Biden 55% - 43%
2022	Senate (Reg.)	Padilla 51% - 49%
2022	Governor	Dahle 52% - 48%
2022	Lt. Governor	Underwood Jacobs 51% - 49%
2022	Secretary of State	Bernosky 50.3% - 49.7%
2022	Attorney General	Hochman 50.5% - 49.5%
2022	Treasurer	Guerrero 51% - 49%
2022	Controller	Chen 53% - 47%
2024	President	Trump 49% - 48%
2024	Senate (Reg.)	Garvey 51% - 49%

== Composition ==
FIPS County Code	County	Seat	Population
13	Contra Costa	Martinez	1,155,025
77	San Joaquin	Stockton	789,410
99	Stanislaus	Modesto	551,430

Under the 2020 redistricting, California's 9th congressional district is located between the Sacramento Valley, Gold Country, and the San Joaquin Valley. It encompasses most of San Joaquin County, and parts of Contra Costa and Stanislaus Counties. The area in San Joaquin County includes the cities of Stockton, Tracy, Manteca, Lodi, Ripon, and Escalon; and the census-designated places Mountain House, Terminous, Thornton, Collierville, Woodbridge, Acampo, Dogtown, Lockeford, Victor, Lincoln Village, Morada, Country Club, August, Garden Acres, Kennedy, Taft Mosswood, French Camp, Waterloo, Linden, Peters, Farmington, and Del Rio. The area in Contra Costa County includes the census-designated places Discovery Bay and Byron. The area in Stanislaus County includes the census-designated place Valley Home.

San Joaquin County is split between this district and the 13th district. They are partitioned by Union Pacific, Highway 380, S Tracy Blvd, the California Aqueduct, S Banta Rd, Highway 5, Paradise Cut, S Manthey Rd, Walthall Slough, E West Ripon Rd, Kincaid Rd, Hutchinson Rd, and Stanislaus River.

Contra Costa County is split between this district and the 10th district. They are partitioned by Old River, Italian Slough, Western Farms Ranch Rd, Rankin Rd, Highway J14, Byron Hot Springs Rd, Camino Diablo, Kellogg Creek, Sellers Ave, Brentwood Blvd, Alloro Dr, Ghiggeri Dr, Emilio Dr, Guthrie Ln, Balfour Rd, Chestnut St, Byron Highway, Orwood Rd, Burlington Northern Santa Fe, Werner Dredger Cut, and Rock Slough.

Stanislaus County is split between this district and the 13th district. Lon Dale Rd, Highway J9, Highway J14, River Rock Rd, Lesnini Creek, Sonora Rd, and Stanislaus River.

=== Cities and CDPs with 10,000 or more people ===
- Stockton – 320,804
- Tracy – 93,000
- Manteca – 83,498
- Lodi – 67,258
- Mountain House – 24,499
- Ripon – 16,013
- Discovery Bay – 15,385
- Garden Acres – 11,398
- Country Club – 10,777

=== 2,500 – 10,000 people ===
- August – 8,628
- Escalon – 7,472
- Lincoln Village – 4,401
- Woodbridge – 4,031
- French Camp – 3,770
- Lockeford – 3,521
- Kennedy – 3,256
- Morada – 3,166
- Collierville – 2,698
- Dogtown – 2,643

== Future composition ==
Beginning with the 2026 election, the 9th district will consist of the following counties:

- Contra Costa (part)
- San Joaquin (part)

== List of members representing the district ==
Representative	Party	Dates	Cong ress	Electoral history	Counties
District created March 4, 1913
Charles W. Bell (Pasadena)	Progressive	March 4, 1913 – March 3, 1915	63rd	Elected in 1912. Lost re-election.	1913–1933; Los Angeles outside Los Angeles city
Charles Hiram Randall (Los Angeles)	Prohibition	March 4, 1915 – March 3, 1921	64th 65th 66th	Elected in 1914. Re-elected in 1916. Re-elected in 1918. Lost re-election.	1913–1933; Los Angeles outside Los Angeles city
Vacant		March 4, 1921 – April 11, 1921	67th	Representative-elect Charles F. Van de Water died November 20, 1920.	1913–1933; Los Angeles outside Los Angeles city
Walter F. Lineberger (Long Beach)	Republican	April 11, 1921 – March 3, 1927	67th 68th 69th	Elected to finish Van de Water's term. Re-elected in 1922. Re-elected in 1924. Retired to run for U.S. Senator.	1913–1933; Los Angeles outside Los Angeles city
William E. Evans (Glendale)	Republican	March 4, 1927 – March 3, 1933	70th 71st 72nd	Elected in 1926. Re-elected in 1928. Re-elected in 1930. Redistricted to the 11th district.	1913–1933; Los Angeles outside Los Angeles city
Denver S. Church (Fresno)	Democratic	March 4, 1933 – January 3, 1935	73rd	Elected in 1932. Retired.	1933–1943; Fresno, Kings, Madera, Merced, Stanislaus
Bertrand W. Gearhart (Fresno)	Republican	January 3, 1935 – January 3, 1949	74th 75th 76th 77th 78th 79th 80th	Elected in 1934. Re-elected in 1936. Re-elected in 1938. Re-elected in 1940. Re-elected in 1942. Re-elected in 1944. Re-elected in 1946. Lost re-election.	1933–1943; Fresno, Kings, Madera, Merced, Stanislaus
Bertrand W. Gearhart (Fresno)	Republican	January 3, 1935 – January 3, 1949	74th 75th 76th 77th 78th 79th 80th	Elected in 1934. Re-elected in 1936. Re-elected in 1938. Re-elected in 1940. Re-elected in 1942. Re-elected in 1944. Re-elected in 1946. Lost re-election.	1943–1953; Fresno, Madera, Merced, Stanislaus
Cecil F. White (Fresno)	Democratic	January 3, 1949 – January 3, 1951	81st	Elected in 1948. Lost re-election.	1943–1953; Fresno, Madera, Merced, Stanislaus
Allan O. Hunter (Fresno)	Republican	January 3, 1951 – January 3, 1953	82nd	Elected in 1950. Redistricted to the 12th district.	1943–1953; Fresno, Madera, Merced, Stanislaus
J. Arthur Younger (San Mateo)	Republican	January 3, 1953 – January 3, 1963	83rd 84th 85th 86th 87th	Elected in 1952. Re-elected in 1954. Re-elected in 1956. Re-elected in 1958. Re-elected in 1960. Redistricted to the 11th district.	San Mateo
Don Edwards (San Jose)	Democratic	January 3, 1963 – January 3, 1975	88th 89th 90th 91st 92nd 93rd	Elected in 1962. Re-elected in 1964. Re-elected in 1966. Re-elected in 1968. Re-elected in 1970. Re-elected in 1972. Redistricted to the 10th district.	1963–1967; Eastern Santa Clara
Don Edwards (San Jose)	Democratic	January 3, 1963 – January 3, 1975	88th 89th 90th 91st 92nd 93rd	Elected in 1962. Re-elected in 1964. Re-elected in 1966. Re-elected in 1968. Re-elected in 1970. Re-elected in 1972. Redistricted to the 10th district.	1967–1973; Southwest Alameda, most of Santa Clara
Don Edwards (San Jose)	Democratic	January 3, 1963 – January 3, 1975	88th 89th 90th 91st 92nd 93rd	Elected in 1962. Re-elected in 1964. Re-elected in 1966. Re-elected in 1968. Re-elected in 1970. Re-elected in 1972. Redistricted to the 10th district.	1973–1975; Southwest Alameda, northeast Santa Clara
Pete Stark (Oakland)	Democratic	January 3, 1975 – January 3, 1993	94th 95th 96th 97th 98th 99th 100th 101st 102nd	Redistricted from the 8th district and re-elected in 1974. Re-elected in 1976. Re-elected in 1978. Re-elected in 1980. Re-elected in 1982. Re-elected in 1984. Re-elected in 1986. Re-elected in 1988. Re-elected in 1990. Redistricted to the 13th district.	1975–1983; Alameda outside Oakland
Ron Dellums (Oakland)	Democratic	January 3, 1993 – February 6, 1998	103rd 104th 105th	Redistricted from the 8th district and re-elected in 1992. Re-elected in 1994. Re-elected in 1996. Resigned.	1993–2003; Alameda (Berkeley, Oakland)
Vacant		February 6, 1998 – April 7, 1998	105th		1993–2003; Alameda (Berkeley, Oakland)
Barbara Lee (Oakland)	Democratic	April 7, 1998 – January 3, 2013	105th 106th 107th 108th 109th 110th 111th 112th	Elected to finish Dellums's term. Re-elected in 1998. Re-elected in 2000. Re-elected in 2002. Re-elected in 2004. Re-elected in 2006. Re-elected in 2008. Re-elected in 2010. Redistricted to the 13th district.	1993–2003; Alameda (Berkeley, Oakland)
Barbara Lee (Oakland)	Democratic	April 7, 1998 – January 3, 2013	105th 106th 107th 108th 109th 110th 111th 112th	Elected to finish Dellums's term. Re-elected in 1998. Re-elected in 2000. Re-elected in 2002. Re-elected in 2004. Re-elected in 2006. Re-elected in 2008. Re-elected in 2010. Redistricted to the 13th district.	2003–2013 Alameda (Berkeley, Oakland)
Jerry McNerney (Stockton)	Democratic	January 3, 2013 – January 3, 2023	113th 114th 115th 116th 117th	Redistricted from the 11th district and re-elected in 2012. Re-elected in 2014. Re-elected in 2016. Re-elected in 2018. Re-elected in 2020. Retired.	2013–2023 Central Valley including San Joaquin Delta and Stockton
Josh Harder (Tracy)	Democratic	January 3, 2023 – present	118th 119th	Redistricted from the 10th district and re-elected in 2022. Re-elected in 2024. Re-elected in 2026.	2023–present: northern San Joaquin Valley

== Election results ==
=== 1912 ===
United States House of Representatives elections, 1912
Party	Candidate	Votes	%
Republican	Charles W. Bell	28,845	47.2
Democratic	Thomas H. Kirk	14,571	23.9
Socialist	Ralph L. Criswell	11,123	18.2
Prohibition	George S. Yarnall	6,510	10.7
Total votes		61,049	100.0
Turnout			
Republican win (new seat)			

=== 1914 ===
United States House of Representatives elections, 1914
Party	Candidate	Votes	%
Prohibition	Charles Hiram Randall	28,097	30.9
Progressive	Charles W. Bell (incumbent)	27,560	30.3
Republican	Frank C. Roberts	25,176	27.7
Socialist	Henry A. Hart	10,084	11.1
Total votes		90,917	100.0
Turnout			
Prohibition gain from Republican			

=== 1916 ===
United States House of Representatives elections, 1916
Party	Candidate	Votes	%
Prohibition	Charles Hiram Randall (Incumbent)	58,826	57.8
Independent	Charles W. Bell	33,270	32.7
Socialist	Ralph L. Criswell	9,661	9.5
Total votes		101,757	100.0
Turnout			
Prohibition hold			

=== 1918 ===
United States House of Representatives elections, 1918
Party	Candidate	Votes	%
Prohibition	Charles Hiram Randall (Incumbent)	38,782	53.0
Republican	Montaville Flowers	31,689	43.3
Socialist	Grace Silver Henry	2,718	3.7
Total votes		73,189	100.0
Turnout			
Prohibition hold			

=== 1920 ===
United States House of Representatives elections, 1920
Party	Candidate	Votes	%
Republican	Charles F. Van de Water	62,952	59.7
Prohibition	Charles Hiram Randall (Incumbent)	36,675	34.8
Socialist	Mary E. Garbutt	5,819	5.5
Total votes		105,446	100.0
Turnout			
Republican gain from Prohibition			

=== 1921 (Special) ===
Republican Walter F. Lineberger won the special election to replace fellow Republican Charles F. Van de Water, who won the election but died before the 67th Congress convened. Data for this special election is not available.

=== 1922 ===
United States House of Representatives elections, 1922
Party	Candidate	Votes	%
Republican	Walter F. Lineberger (Incumbent)	66,265	59.1
Prohibition	Charles Hiram Randall	45,794	40.9
Total votes		112,059	100.0
Turnout			
Republican hold			

=== 1924 ===
United States House of Representatives elections, 1924
Party	Candidate	Votes	%
Republican	Walter F. Lineberger (Incumbent)	119,993	63.9
Prohibition	Charles Hiram Randall	67,735	36.1
Total votes		187,728	100.0
Turnout			
Republican hold			

=== 1926 ===
United States House of Representatives elections, 1926
Party	Candidate	Votes	%
Republican	William E. Evans (incumbent)	102,270	59.5
Prohibition	Charles Hiram Randall	61,719	35.9
Socialist	Charles F. Conley	7,943	4.6
Total votes		171,932	100.0
Turnout			
Republican hold			

=== 1928 ===
United States House of Representatives elections, 1928
Party	Candidate	Votes	%
Republican	William E. Evans (incumbent)	222,261	77.0
Democratic	James B. Ogg	58,263	20.2
Socialist	Christian Sorenson	8,090	2.8
Total votes		288,614	100.0
Turnout			
Republican hold			

=== 1930 ===
United States House of Representatives elections, 1930
Party	Candidate	Votes	%
Republican	William E. Evans (incumbent)	182,176	100.0
Turnout			
Republican hold			

=== 1932 ===
United States House of Representatives elections, 1932
Party	Candidate	Votes	%
Democratic	Denver S. Church	50,125	61.6
Republican	Henry E. Barbour (Incumbent)	31,209	38.4
Total votes		81,334	100.0
Turnout			
Democratic gain from Republican			

=== 1934 ===
United States House of Representatives elections, 1934
Party	Candidate	Votes	%
Republican	Bertrand W. Gearhart	77,650	100.0
Turnout			
Republican gain from Democratic			

=== 1936 ===
United States House of Representatives elections, 1936
Party	Candidate	Votes	%
Republican	Bertrand W. Gearhart (Incumbent)	82,360	97
Communist	Carl B. Patterson	2,571	3
Total votes		84,931	100
Turnout			
Republican hold			

=== 1938 ===
United States House of Representatives elections, 1938
Party	Candidate	Votes	%
Republican	Bertrand W. Gearhart (Incumbent)	91,128	96.3
No party	George H. Sciaroni (write-in)	3,536	3.7
Total votes		94,664	100.0
Turnout			
Republican hold			

=== 1940 ===
United States House of Representatives elections, 1940
Party	Candidate	Votes	%
Republican	Bertrand W. Gearhart (Incumbent)	99,708	100.0
Turnout			
Republican hold			

=== 1942 ===
United States House of Representatives elections, 1942
Party	Candidate	Votes	%
Republican	Bertrand W. Gearhart (Incumbent)	65,791	100.0
Turnout			
Republican hold			

=== 1944 ===
United States House of Representatives elections, 1944
Party	Candidate	Votes	%
Republican	Bertrand W. Gearhart (Incumbent)	66,845	100.0
Turnout			
Republican hold			

=== 1946 ===
United States House of Representatives elections, 1946
Party	Candidate	Votes	%
Republican	Bertrand W. Gearhart (Incumbent)	50,171	53.7
Democratic	Hubert Phillips	43,244	46.3
Total votes		93,415	100.0
Turnout			
Republican hold			

=== 1948 ===
United States House of Representatives elections, 1948
Party	Candidate	Votes	%
Democratic	Cecil F. White	72,826	51.3
Republican	Bertrand W. Gearhart (Incumbent)	66,563	46.9
Progressive	Josephine F. Daniels	2,573	1.8
Total votes		141,962	100.0
Turnout			
Democratic gain from Republican			

=== 1950 ===
United States House of Representatives elections, 1950
Party	Candidate	Votes	%
Republican	Allan O. Hunter	76,015	52
Democratic	Cecil F. White (incumbent)	70,201	48
Total votes		146,216	100.0
Turnout			
Republican gain from Democratic			

=== 1952 ===
United States House of Representatives elections, 1952
Party	Candidate	Votes	%
Republican	J. Arthur Younger (incumbent)	71,426	53.1
Democratic	Harold F. Taggart	61,028	45.3
Progressive	Charles S. Brown	2,140	1.6
Total votes		134,594	100.0
Turnout			
Republican win (new seat)			

=== 1954 ===
United States House of Representatives elections, 1954
Party	Candidate	Votes	%
Republican	J. Arthur Younger (incumbent)	60,648	54.5
Democratic	Harold F. Taggart	50,619	45.5
Total votes		111,267	100.0
Turnout			
Republican hold			

=== 1956 ===
United States House of Representatives elections, 1956
Party	Candidate	Votes	%
Republican	J. Arthur Younger (incumbent)	96,388	60.3
Democratic	James T. McKay	63,504	39.7
Total votes		159,892	100.0
Turnout			
Republican hold			

=== 1958 ===
United States House of Representatives elections, 1958
Party	Candidate	Votes	%
Republican	J. Arthur Younger (incumbent)	90,735	58.8
Democratic	Elma D. Oddstad	63,597	41.2
Total votes		154,332	100.0
Turnout			
Republican hold			

=== 1960 ===
United States House of Representatives elections, 1960
Party	Candidate	Votes	%
Republican	J. Arthur Younger (incumbent)	116,589	59.2
Democratic	John D. Kaster	80,227	40.8
Total votes		196,816	100.0
Turnout			
Republican hold			

=== 1962 ===
United States House of Representatives elections, 1962
Party	Candidate	Votes	%
Democratic	Don Edwards	79,616	66
Republican	Joseph F. Donovan	41,104	34
Total votes		120,720	100
Turnout			
Democratic win (new seat)			

=== 1964 ===
United States House of Representatives elections, 1964
Party	Candidate	Votes	%
Democratic	Don Edwards (incumbent)	115,954	69.8
Republican	Joseph F. Donovan	50,261	30.2
Total votes		166,215	100.0
Turnout			
Democratic hold			

=== 1966 ===
United States House of Representatives elections, 1966
Party	Candidate	Votes	%
Democratic	Don Edwards (incumbent)	97,311	63.2
Republican	Wilbur G. Durkee	56,784	36.8
Total votes		154,095	100.0
Turnout			
Democratic hold			

=== 1968 ===
United States House of Representatives elections, 1968
Party	Candidate	Votes	%
Democratic	Don Edwards (incumbent)	100,891	56.5
Republican	Larry Fargher	77,521	43.5
Total votes		178,412	100.0
Turnout			
Democratic hold			

=== 1970 ===
United States House of Representatives elections, 1970
Party	Candidate	Votes	%
Democratic	Don Edwards (incumbent)	120,041	69.1
Republican	Mark Guerra	49,556	28.5
American Independent	Edmon V. Kaiser	4,009	2.3
Total votes		173,606	100.0
Turnout			
Democratic hold			

=== 1972 ===
United States House of Representatives elections, 1972
Party	Candidate	Votes	%
Democratic	Don Edwards (incumbent)	123,837	72.3
Republican	Herb Smith	43,134	25.2
American Independent	Edmon V. Kaiser	4,403	2.5
Total votes		171,374	100
Turnout			
Democratic hold			

=== 1974 ===
United States House of Representatives elections, 1974
Party	Candidate	Votes	%
Democratic	Pete Stark (incumbent)	87,854	70.6
Republican	Edson Adams	36,522	29.4
Total votes		124,376	100.0
Turnout			
Democratic hold			

=== 1976 ===
United States House of Representatives elections, 1976
Party	Candidate	Votes	%
Democratic	Pete Stark (incumbent)	116,398	70.8
Republican	James K. Mills	44,607	27.1
Peace and Freedom	Albert L. Sargis	3,386	2.1
Total votes		164,391	100.0
Turnout			
Democratic hold			

=== 1978 ===
United States House of Representatives elections, 1978
Party	Candidate	Votes	%
Democratic	Pete Stark (incumbent)	88,179	65.4
Republican	Robert S. Allen	41,138	30.5
Peace and Freedom	Lawrance J. Phillips	5,562	4.1
Total votes		134,879	100.0
Turnout			
Democratic hold			

=== 1980 ===
United States House of Representatives elections, 1980
Party	Candidate	Votes	%
Democratic	Pete Stark (incumbent)	90,504	55.3
Republican	William J. "Bill" Kennedy	67,265	41.1
Libertarian	Steven W. Clanin	5,823	3.6
Total votes		163,592	100.0
Turnout			
Democratic hold			

=== 1982 ===
United States House of Representatives elections, 1982
Party	Candidate	Votes	%
Democratic	Pete Stark (incumbent)	104,393	60.7
Republican	William J. "Bill" Kennedy	67,702	39.3
Total votes		172,095	100.0
Turnout			
Democratic hold			

=== 1984 ===
United States House of Representatives elections, 1984
Party	Candidate	Votes	%
Democratic	Pete Stark (incumbent)	136,511	69.9
Republican	J. T. "Eager" Beaver	51,399	26.3
Libertarian	Martha Fuhrig	7,398	3.8
Total votes		195,308	100.0
Turnout			
Democratic hold			

=== 1986 ===
United States House of Representatives elections, 1986
Party	Candidate	Votes	%
Democratic	Pete Stark (incumbent)	113,490	69.7
Republican	David M. "Dave" Williams	49,300	30.3
Total votes		162,790	100.0
Turnout			
Democratic hold			

=== 1988 ===
United States House of Representatives elections, 1988
Party	Candidate	Votes	%
Democratic	Pete Stark (incumbent)	152,866	73
Republican	Howard Hertz	56,656	27
Total votes		214,522	100
Turnout			
Democratic hold			

=== 1990 ===
United States House of Representatives elections, 1990
Party	Candidate	Votes	%
Democratic	Pete Stark (incumbent)	94,739	58.4
Republican	Victor Romero	67,412	41.6
Total votes		162,151	100.0
Turnout			
Democratic hold			

=== 1992 ===
United States House of Representatives elections, 1992
Party	Candidate	Votes	%
Democratic	Ron Dellums (incumbent)	164,265	71.9
Republican	G. William "Billy" Hunter	53,707	23.5
Peace and Freedom	Dave Linn	10,472	4.6
No party	Muss (write-in)	23	0.0
Total votes		228,467	100.0
Turnout			
Democratic hold			

=== 1994 ===
United States House of Representatives elections, 1994
Party	Candidate	Votes	%
Democratic	Ron Dellums (incumbent)	129,233	72.25
Republican	Deborah Wright	40,448	22.61
Peace and Freedom	Emma Wong Mar	9,194	5.14
Total votes		178,875	100.0
Turnout			
Democratic hold			

=== 1996 ===
United States House of Representatives elections, 1996
Party	Candidate	Votes	%
Democratic	Ron Dellums (incumbent)	154,806	77.1
Republican	Deborah Wright	37,126	18.5
Peace and Freedom	Tom Condit	5,561	2.7
Natural Law	Jack Forem	3,475	1.7
Republican	Omari Musa (write-in)	8	0.0
Total votes		200,976	100.0
Turnout			
Democratic hold			

=== 1998 (Special) ===
List of special elections to the United States House of Representatives in California
Party	Candidate	Votes	%
Democratic	Barbara Lee	33,497	66.81
Democratic	Greg Harper	8,048	16.05
Republican	Claiborne Sanders	6,114	12.19
Democratic	Randal Stewart	2,481	4.95
Total votes		50,140	100.00
Turnout			
Democratic hold			

=== 1998 ===
United States House of Representatives elections, 1998
Party	Candidate	Votes	%
Democratic	Barbara Lee (incumbent)	140,722	82.83
Republican	Claiborne "Clay" Sanders	22,431	13.20
Peace and Freedom	Gerald Sanders	4,767	2.81
Natural Law	Walter Ruehlig	1,975	1.16
Total votes		169,895	100.0
Turnout			
Democratic hold			

=== 2000 ===
2000 United States House of Representatives elections in California
Party	Candidate	Votes	%
Democratic	Barbara Lee (incumbent)	182,352	85.0
Republican	Arneze Washington	21,033	9.8
Libertarian	Fred E. Foldvary	7,051	3.3
Natural Law	Ellen Jefferds	4,214	1.9
Total votes		214,650	100.0
Turnout			
Democratic hold			

=== 2002 ===
2002 United States House of Representatives elections in California
Party	Candidate	Votes	%
Democratic	Barbara Lee (incumbent)	135,893	85.0
Republican	Jerald Udinsky	25,333	9.8
Libertarian	James M. Eyer	5,685	3.4
Republican	Hector Reyna (write-in)	6	0.0
Total votes		166,917	100.0
Turnout			
Democratic hold			

=== 2004 ===
2004 United States House of Representatives elections in California
Party	Candidate	Votes	%
Democratic	Barbara Lee (incumbent)	215,630	84.6
Republican	Claudia Bermudez	31,278	12.3
Libertarian	James M. Eyer	8,131	3.1
Total votes		255,039	100.0
Turnout			
Democratic hold			

=== 2006 ===
2006 United States House of Representatives elections in California
Party	Candidate	Votes	%
Democratic	Barbara Lee (incumbent)	167,245	86.4
Republican	John "J.D." Den Dulk	20,786	10.7
Libertarian	James M. Eyer	5,655	2.9
Total votes		193,686	100.0
Turnout			
Democratic hold			

=== 2008 ===
2008 United States House of Representatives elections in California
Party	Candidate	Votes	%
Democratic	Barbara Lee (incumbent)	238,915	86.06
Republican	Charles Hargrave	26,917	9.70
Libertarian	James M. Eyer	11,704	4.22
Total votes		277,536	100.0
Turnout			
Democratic hold			

=== 2010 ===
2010 United States House of Representatives elections in California
Party	Candidate	Votes	%
Democratic	Barbara Lee (incumbent)	180,400	84.27
Republican	Gerald Hashimito	23,054	10.77
Green	Dave Heller	4,848	2.27
Libertarian	James M. Eyer	4,113	1.92
Peace and Freedom	Larry Allen	1,670	0.78
Total votes		214,085	100.0
Turnout			
Democratic hold			

=== 2012 ===
2012 United States House of Representatives elections in California
Party	Candidate	Votes	%
Democratic	Jerry McNerney (incumbent)	118,373	55.6
Republican	Ricky Gill	94,704	44.4
Total votes		213,077	100.0
Democratic hold			

=== 2014 ===
2014 United States House of Representatives elections in California
Party	Candidate	Votes	%
Democratic	Jerry McNerney (incumbent)	63,475	52.4
Republican	Antonio C. Amador	57,729	47.6
Total votes		121,204	100.0
Democratic hold			

=== 2016 ===
2016 United States House of Representatives elections in California
Party	Candidate	Votes	%
Democratic	Jerry McNerney (incumbent)	133,163	57.4
Republican	Antonio C. Amador	98,992	42.6
Total votes		232,155	100.0
Democratic hold			

=== 2018 ===
2018 United States House of Representatives elections in California
Party	Candidate	Votes	%
Democratic	Jerry McNerney (incumbent)	113,414	56.5
Republican	Marla Livengood	87,349	43.5
Total votes		200,763	100.0
Democratic hold			

=== 2020 ===
2020 United States House of Representatives elections in California
Party	Candidate	Votes	%
Democratic	Jerry McNerney (incumbent)	174,252	57.6
Republican	Antonio C. "Tony" Amador	128,358	42.4
Total votes		302,610	100.0
Democratic hold			

=== 2022 ===
2022 United States House of Representatives elections in California
Party	Candidate	Votes	%
Democratic	Josh Harder (incumbent)	95,598	54.8
Republican	Tom Patti	78,802	45.2
Total votes		174,400	100.0
Democratic hold			

=== 2024 ===
2024 United States House of Representatives elections in California
Party	Candidate	Votes	%
Democratic	Josh Harder (incumbent)	130,183	51.8
Republican	Kevin Lincoln	121,174	48.2
Total votes		251,357	100.0
Democratic hold			

== See also ==
- List of United States congressional districts
- California's congressional districts
