= Lammersville Elementary School District =

School district in California

Lammersville Unified School District

Address
- 111 South De Anza Boulevard Mountain House, California, 95391; United States

District information
- Type: Public
- Grades: K–12
- Superintendent: Dr. Kirk Nicholas
- NCES District ID: 0601410

Students and staff
- Students: 6,397 (2020–2021)
- Teachers: 270.05 (FTE)
- Staff: 185.49 (FTE)
- Student–teacher ratio: 23.69:1

Other information
- Website: www.lammersvilleschooldistrict.net

Lammersville Unified School District is a school district in Mountain House, California and serves the area of Mountain House and rural Tracy.

== History ==
On January 20, 2010 San Joaquin County education committee gave its approval to the proposal for Lammersville to break away from Tracy Unified, which the district has worked toward since 2008. Lammersville residents on June 8, 2010 voted to form the Lammersville Unified School District.The district will separate from Tracy Unified and form an independent school district on July 1, 2011.

== Schools ==
=== Established schools ===
- Wicklund Elementary School, Mountain House
- Bethany Elementary School, Mountain House
- Lammersville Elementary School, Mountain House
- Sebastian Questa Elementary School, Mountain House
- Altamont Elementary School, Mountain House
- Hansen Elementary School, Mountain House
- Evelyn Costa Elementary School, Mountain House
- Julius Cordes Elementary School, Mountain House
- Mountain House High School, Mountain House
