= Stockton Unified School District =

School district in California

Address
- 56 South Lincoln Street. Stockton, California, 95203; United States
- Coordinates: 37°57′34″N 121°17′46″W

District information
- Established: 1852; 174 years ago
- Superintendent: Dr. Michelle Rodriguez, Superintendent of Schools as of July 1, 2023.
- NCES District ID: 0638010

Students and staff
- Students: 36,190 (2020-2021)
- Student–teacher ratio: 22.83

Other information
- Website: www.stocktonusd.net

Stockton Unified School District (SUSD) is a school district headquartered in Stockton, California. Most of the city of Stockton is served by SUSD.

== History ==
The public school was founded in Stockton by Mr. V. M. Peyton on October 30, 1852, during the midst of the California gold rush, when the public school ordinance he drafted and championed was unanimously passed by the Common Council. After suitable teachers and rooms were obtained, public schools opened February 23, 1853. The superintendent gave the first annual report in November 1853: that of the 685 children in the county between the ages of 5 and 18, over 256 of them have been attending the public schools.

The first high school class in Stockton had 28 students when it opened in 1870. In 1900, Stockton voters approved the formation of a separate high school district that was larger than the existing elementary school district. Thirty five years later, legislation was passed unifying these two districts; on July 1, 1936, the Stockton Unified School District was established.

Stockton Unified School District serves nearly 40,000 students at 55 K-12 and high schools. The diverse district includes dependent and independent charters, large comprehensive high schools and smaller secondary schools focused on such specialty areas as health careers, academic rigor, law and technical career pathways.

SUSD boasted three high schools named U.S. News & World Report top high schools in the country, a nationally recognized AVID Demonstration high school, and gold medal winning jazz bands and Mariachis. Stockton Unified leadership is shared by its Peer Leaders Uniting Students teams, which set school climates for every elementary and high school. The district's newest program is the Public Safety Academy, which is preparing students for careers in law enforcement, fire safety, emergency response and other areas of public protection.

== Boundary ==
In addition to the majority of Stockton, the district also serves the unincorporated communities of August, Country Club, Garden Acres, Kennedy and Taft Mosswood.

== Schools ==
=== Elementary schools ===
- Adams Elementary School
- August Elementary School
- Bush Elementary School
- Cleveland Elementary School
- Commodore Stockton Skills Elementary School
- El Dorado Elementary School
- Elmwood Elementary School
- Fillmore Elementary School
- Fremont-Lopez Elementary School
- Flora Arca Mata Elementary School
- Grunsky Elementary School
- Hamilton Elementary School
- Harrison Elementary School
- Hazelton Elementary School
- Henry Elementary School
- Hong Kingston Elementary School
- Hoover Elementary School
- Huerta Elementary School
- Kennedy Elementary School
- King Elementary School
- Kohl Open Elementary School
- Madison Elementary School
- Marshall Elementary School
- McKinley Elementary School
- Monroe Elementary School
- Montezuma Elementary School
- Nightingale Elementary School
- Peyton Elementary School
- Primary Years Academy
- Pulliam Elementary School
- Rio Calaveras Elementary School
- Roosevelt Elementary School
- San Joaquin Elementary School
- Spanos Elementary School
- Taft Elementary School
- Taylor Elementary School
- Tyler Elementary School
- Van Buren Elementary School
- Victory Elementary School
- Washington Elementary School
- Wilson Elementary School

=== High schools ===
- Cesar Chavez High School
- Edison High School
- Franklin High School
- Jane Frederick High School
- Stagg High School
- Stockton High School (1904-1948)

=== Specialty Schools And Programs ===
- Health Careers Academy
- Merlo Institute of Environmental Technology
- Pacific Law Academy
- School for Adults
- Stockton Early College Academy
- Stockton Public Safety Academy
- Walton Special Center
- Weber Institute of Applied Sciences and Technology

=== Charter schools ===
- Pittman Charter
- Nightingale Charter
