= California's 13th State Assembly district =

American legislative district

Current assemblymember
Rhodesia Ransom; D–Tracy
- Population (2020): 461,772
- Demographics: 20.01% White; 9.83% Black; 42.87% Latino; 21.23% Asian; 0.38% Native American; 0.74% Hawaiian/Pacific Islander; 0.53% other; 4.37% remainder of multiracial

California's 13th State Assembly district is one of 80 California State Assembly districts. It is currently represented by Democrat Rhodesia Ransom of Tracy.

== District profile ==
The district consists of western San Joaquin County, including the southeastern quarter of the Sacramento–San Joaquin River Delta. The district is a major gateway between the rest of the Central Valley and the San Francisco Bay Area.

San Joaquin County – (63.03%)

- Mountain House
- Stockton
- Tracy

== Election results from statewide races ==
Year	Office	Results
2024	President	Harris 55.0 – 41.6%
2024	Senator	Schiff 57.3 – 42.7
2022	Senator	Padilla 61.1 – 38.9%
2022	Governor	Newsom 57.9 – 42.1
2021	Recall	No 61.2 - 38.8%
2021	Recall	Elder 48.5 - 7.3%
2020	President	Biden 63.1 – 34.7%
2018	Senator	Feinstein 50.3 – 49.7%
2018	Governor	Newsom 60.3 – 39.7%
2016	Senator	Harris 57.5 – 42.5%
2016	President	Clinton 63.0 – 31.8%
2014	Governor	Brown 61.1 – 38.9%
2012	Senator	Feinstein 65.1 – 34.9%
2012	President	Obama 64.2 – 33.9%

== List of assembly members representing the district ==
Due to redistricting, the 13th district has been moved around different parts of the state. The current iteration resulted from the 2021 redistricting by the California Citizens Redistricting Commission.

Assembly members	Party	Years served	Counties represented	Notes
William H. Parks	Republican	January 5, 1885 – January 3, 1887	Yuba, Sutter	
George Ohleyer	Democratic	January 3, 1887 – January 7, 1889	Yuba, Sutter	
Daniel A. Ostrom	Democratic	January 7, 1889 – January 5, 1891	Yuba, Sutter	
Harry P. Stabler	Democratic	January 5, 1891 – January 2, 1893	Yuba, Sutter	
George W. Hamilton	Democratic	January 2, 1893 – January 7, 1895	Placer	
A. P. Hall	Republican	January 7, 1895 – January 4, 1897	Placer	
Harold T. Power	Republican	January 4, 1897 – January 2, 1899	Placer	
William B. Lardner	Republican	January 2, 1899 – January 1, 1901	Placer	
Frank A. Duryea	Republican	January 1, 1901 – January 5, 1903	Placer	
Frank A. Cromwell	Republican	January 5, 1903 – January 7, 1907	Sonoma	
Stanley W. Collister	Republican	January 7, 1907 – January 4, 1909	Sonoma	
William Benjamin Whitney	Republican	January 4, 1909 – January 2, 1911	Sonoma	
James W. Hamilton	Republican	January 2, 1911 – January 6, 1913	Sonoma	
Herbert W. Slater	Democratic	January 6, 1913 – January 4, 1915	Sonoma	
George W. Salisbury	Democratic	January 4, 1915 – January 8, 1917	Sonoma	
Robert Madison	Republican	January 8, 1917 – January 3, 1921	Sonoma	
Lucien E. Fulwider	Republican	January 3, 1921 – January 5, 1925	Sonoma	
David Pressley Anderson	Republican	January 5, 1925 – January 7, 1929	Sonoma	
Frank W. Luttrell	Democratic	January 7, 1929 – January 5, 1931	Sonoma	
Robert P. Easley	Republican	January 5, 1931 – January 2, 1933	Contra Costa	
James M. Cassidy	Democratic	January 2, 1933 – June 17, 1941	Alameda	Died in office.
Vacant		June 17, 1941 – January 4, 1943	Alameda	
Francis Dunn Jr.	Democratic	January 4, 1943 – January 3, 1955	Alameda	
Carlos Bee	Democratic	January 3, 1955 – November 29, 1974	Alameda	Died in office, at the end of his term.
John J. Miller	Democratic	December 2, 1974 – November 30, 1978	Alameda	He was the first African–American to hold a party leadership position in the California State Legislature.
Elihu Harris	Democratic	December 4, 1978 – November 30, 1990	Alameda	
Barbara Lee	Democratic	December 3, 1990 – November 30, 1992	Alameda	
Willie Brown	Democratic	December 7, 1992 – December 14, 1995	San Francisco	Resigned from California State Assembly.
Vacant		December 14, 1995 – March 28, 1996	San Francisco	
Carole Migden	Democratic	March 28, 1996 – November 30, 2002	San Francisco	Won special election and was sworn in.
Mark Leno	Democratic	December 2, 2002 – November 30, 2008	San Francisco	
Tom Ammiano	Democratic	December 1, 2008 – November 30, 2012	San Francisco	
Susan Eggman	Democratic	December 3, 2012 – November 30, 2020	San Joaquin	
Carlos Villapudua	Democratic	December 7, 2020 — November 30, 2024	San Joaquin	
Rhodesia Ransom	Democratic	December 2, 2024 — present	San Joaquin	

== Election results (1990–present) ==
=== 2024 ===
2024 California State Assembly 13th district election
Primary election
Party	Candidate	Votes	%
Democratic	Rhodesia Ransom	27,255	41.6
Republican	Denise Aguilar Mendez	24,823	37.9
Democratic	Edith Villapudua	13,415	20.5
Total votes		47,562	100.0
General election
Democratic	Rhodesia Ransom	78,071	56.9
Republican	Denise Aguilar Mendez	59,237	43.1
Total votes		137,308	100.0
Democratic hold			

=== 2022 ===
2022 California State Assembly 13th district election
Primary election
Party	Candidate	Votes	%
Democratic	Carlos Villapudua (incumbent)	28,099	59.1
Democratic	Veronica Vargas	12,598	26.5
Democratic	Mateo Bedolla	6,643	14.0
Republican	Jessica Wagner (write-in)	222	0.5
Total votes		47,562	100.0
General election
Democratic	Carlos Villapudua (incumbent)	51,891	60.6
Democratic	Veronica Vargas	33,673	39.4
Total votes		85,564	100.0
Democratic hold			

=== 2020 ===
2020 California State Assembly 13th district election
Primary election
Party	Candidate	Votes	%
Democratic	Carlos Villapudua	27,068	35.9
Democratic	Kathy Miller	24,091	31.9
Democratic	Christina Fugazi	24,061	31.9
Republican	Khalid Jeffrey Jafri (write-in)	210	0.3
Total votes		75,430	100.0
General election
Democratic	Carlos Villapudua	83,746	51.6
Democratic	Kathy Miller	78,609	48.4
Total votes		162,355	100.0
Democratic hold			

=== 2018 ===
2018 California State Assembly 13th district election
Primary election
Party	Candidate	Votes	%
Democratic	Susan Eggman (incumbent)	30,826	52.6
Republican	Antonio M. Garcia	17,885	30.5
Democratic	Carlos Villapudua	9,888	16.9
Total votes		58,599	100.0
General election
Democratic	Susan Eggman (incumbent)	74,813	65.4
Republican	Antonio M. Garcia	39,532	34.6
Total votes		114,345	100.0
Democratic hold			

=== 2016 ===
2016 California State Assembly 13th district election
Primary election
Party	Candidate	Votes	%
Democratic	Susan Eggman (incumbent)	39,608	53.4
Republican	Kevin J. Lincoln, II	14,284	19.3
Democratic	K. Jeffrey Jafri	11,728	15.8
Republican	Jacob "Jake" Souza	8,491	11.5
Total votes		74,111	100.0
General election
Democratic	Susan Eggman (incumbent)	86,315	64.8
Republican	Kevin J. Lincoln, II	46,883	35.2
Total votes		133,198	100.0
Democratic hold			

=== 2014 ===
2014 California State Assembly 13th district election
Primary election
Party	Candidate	Votes	%
Democratic	Susan Eggman (incumbent)	22,341	49.7
Republican	Sol Jobrack	14,318	31.8
Democratic	Catherine Jennet Stebbins	8,297	18.5
Total votes		44,956	100.0
General election
Democratic	Susan Eggman (incumbent)	40,635	60.7
Republican	Sol Jobrack	26,254	39.3
Total votes		66,889	100.0
Democratic hold			

=== 2012 ===
2012 California State Assembly 13th district election
Primary election
Party	Candidate	Votes	%
Democratic	Susan Eggman	21,066	39.8
Republican	K. "Jeffrey" Jafri	11,480	21.7
Republican	Dolores Cooper	7,892	14.9
Democratic	C. Jennet Stebbins	6,792	12.8
Democratic	Xochitl Raya Paderes	5,649	10.7
Total votes		52,879	100.0
General election
Democratic	Susan Eggman	78,776	65.4
Republican	K. "Jeffrey" Jafri	41,595	34.6
Total votes		120,371	100.0
Democratic hold			

=== 2010 ===
2010 California State Assembly 13th district election
Party	Candidate	Votes	%
Democratic	Tom Ammiano (incumbent)	120,174	83.0
Republican	Laura Peter	24,741	17.0
Total votes		144,915	100.0
Democratic hold			

=== 2008 ===
2008 California State Assembly 13th district election
Party	Candidate	Votes	%
Democratic	Tom Ammiano	162,977	83.4
Republican	Harmeet Dhillon	32,552	16.6
Total votes		195,529	100.0
Democratic hold			

=== 2006 ===
2006 California State Assembly 13th district election
Party	Candidate	Votes	%
Democratic	Mark Leno (incumbent)	110,937	86.9
Republican	Ramiro Maldonado	16,760	13.1
Total votes		127,697	100.0
Democratic hold			

=== 2004 ===
2004 California State Assembly 13th district election
Party	Candidate	Votes	%
Democratic	Mark Leno (incumbent)	148,863	81.9
Republican	Gail E. Neira	23,900	13.2
Libertarian	Jonathan Scott Marvin	8,980	4.9
Total votes		181,743	100.0
Democratic hold			

=== 2002 ===
2002 California State Assembly 13th district election
Party	Candidate	Votes	%
Democratic	Mark Leno	89,921	81.5
Republican	Gail E. Neira	15,278	13.9
Libertarian	Christopher R. Maden	5,134	4.6
Total votes		110,333	100.0
Democratic hold			

=== 2000 ===
2000 California State Assembly 13th district election
Party	Candidate	Votes	%
Democratic	Carole Migden (incumbent)	115,378	78.6
Republican	Robert C. Lane	22,037	15.0
Libertarian	Starchild	9,469	6.4
Total votes		146,884	100.0
Democratic hold			

=== 1998 ===
1998 California State Assembly 13th district election
Party	Candidate	Votes	%
Democratic	Carole Migden (incumbent)	95,218	84.8
Republican	Randy Bernard	17,073	15.2
Total votes		112,291	100.0
Democratic hold			

=== 1996 ===
1996 California State Assembly 13th district election
Party	Candidate	Votes	%
Democratic	Carole Migden (incumbent)	114,524	100.0
Total votes		114,524	100.0
Democratic hold			

=== 1996 (special) ===
1996 California State Assembly 13th district special election Vacancy resulting from the resignation of Willie Brown
Party	Candidate	Votes	%
Democratic	Carole Migden	61,905	99.3
Republican	Raymond C. Palmucci (write-in)	356	0.6
Democratic	Kevin Williams (write-in)	87	0.1
Total votes		62,348	100.0
Democratic hold			

=== 1994 ===
1994 California State Assembly 13th district election
Party	Candidate	Votes	%
Democratic	Willie Brown (incumbent)	80,158	73.0
Republican	Marc Wolin	21,488	19.6
Libertarian	Mark Read Pickens	8,233	7.5
Total votes		109,879	100.0
Democratic hold			

=== 1992 ===
1992 California State Assembly 13th district election
Party	Candidate	Votes	%
Democratic	Willie Brown (incumbent)	103,799	69.5
Republican	John Sidline	28,253	18.9
Peace and Freedom	Walter Medina	12,042	8.1
Libertarian	Mark Valverde	5,318	3.6
No party	George Mehrabian (write-in)	5	0.0
Total votes		149,417	100.0
Democratic hold			

=== 1990 ===
1990 California State Assembly 13th district election
Party	Candidate	Votes	%
Democratic	Barbara Lee	52,860	79.4
Republican	Barbara M. Thomas	13,682	20.6
Total votes		66,542	100.0
Democratic hold			

== See also ==
- California State Assembly
- California State Assembly districts
- Districts in California
