= Rhodesia Ransom =

American politician

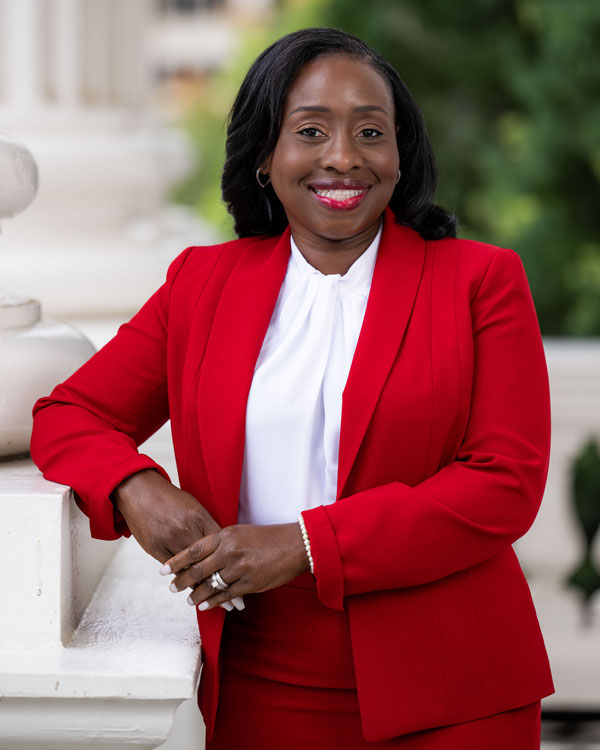
- Official portrait, 2024

Member of the California State Assembly from the 13th district
- Incumbent
- Assumed office December 2, 2024
- Preceded by: Carlos Villapudua

Personal details
- Party: Democratic
- Education: San Francisco State University (BA); Golden Gate University (MPA)

Rhodesia Ransom is an American politician serving as a member of the California State Assembly for the 13th district, based in San Joaquin County, since 2024. A Democrat, she previously served on the Tracy City Council from 2016 to 2020.

== Early life and education ==
Ransom grew up in San Francisco and graduated from San Francisco State University with a Bachelor of Arts in political science and from Golden Gate University with a Master of Public Administration.

== Career ==
Ransom was elected to the Tracy City Council in 2016 and served on the council until November 2020. She criticized the firing of the city's police department chief Larry Esquivel in 2018, calling the move by city manager Randall Bradley political.

She ran for San Joaquin County Board of Supervisors in 2020, narrowly losing in the general election to Tracy mayor Robert Rickman. In April 2021, Ransom was appointed district director for U.S. representative Josh Harder. She was elected to serve as one of 30 representatives for California to the Democratic National Committee in 2022.

=== California Assembly campaign ===
Ransom initially ran for the 5th district of the California State Senate, the seat of term-limited incumbent Susan Talamantes Eggman. She was endorsed by the California Democratic Party and faced realtor Edith Villapudua, wife of moderate Assemblymember Carlos Villapudua. However, the couple switched races on the day before California's candidate filing deadline, with Carlos running for Senate and Edith running for his Assembly seat. The move was characterized as a ploy to better each of their electoral prospects; however it drove former U.S. Representative Jerry McNerney to join the Senate race and Ransom to also switch into the Assembly election. Despite the last-minute switch, Ransom defeated Edith and McNerney defeated Carlos in their respective elections.

== Electoral history ==
=== Tracy City Council ===
2016 Tracy City Council election
Candidate	Votes	%
Nancy D. Young	11,176	26.22
Rhodesia Ransom	10,613	24.90
Mary Souza Mitracos	8,006	18.78
Anne Marie Fuller	6,936	16.27
Amer Hammudi	5,777	13.55
Write-in	119	0.28
Total votes	49,627	100.00

=== San Joaquin County Board of Supervisors ===
2020 San Joaquin County Board of Supervisors 5th district election
Primary election
Candidate	Votes	%
Robert Rickman	13,325	42.13
Rhodesia Ransom	9,332	29.51
Veronica Vargas	5,804	18.35
Mateo Morelos Bedolla	3,074	9.72
Write-in	93	0.29
Total votes	31,628	100.00
General election
Robert Rickman	34,180	50.52
Rhodesia Ransom	33,470	49.48
Total votes	67,650	100.00

=== California State Assembly ===
2024 California State Assembly 13th district election
Primary election
Party	Candidate	Votes	%
Democratic	Rhodesia Ransom	27,255	41.6
Republican	Denise Aguilar Mendez	24,823	37.9
Democratic	Edith Villapudua	13,415	20.5
Total votes		65,493	100.0
General election
Democratic	Rhodesia Ransom	78,071	56.9
Republican	Denise Aguilar Mendez	59,237	43.1
Total votes		137,308	100.0
Democratic hold			
