= California Historical Landmarks in San Joaquin County =

This list includes properties and districts listed on the California Historical Landmark listing in San Joaquin County, California. Click the "Map of all coordinates" link to the right to view a Google map of all properties and districts with latitude and longitude coordinates in the table below.

Image		Landmark name	Location	City or town	Summary
Battle of Stanislaus	214	Battle of Stanislaus	200 yards SE of confluence of San Joaquin and Stanislaus Rivers on N bank of Stanislaus; 37°39′54″N 121°14′13″W	Manteca	
Benson's Ferry	149	Benson's Ferry	S bank of N Fork Mokelumne River 100 ft W of County Rd J8, 3 mi N of Thornton; 38°15′19″N 121°26′26″W	Thornton	
Burial place of John Brown (Juan Flaco)	513	Burial place of John Brown (Juan Flaco)	1100 E. Weber Street; 37°57′22″N 121°16′38″W	Stockton	AKA Juan Flaco Brown and Paul Revere of California
California Chicory Works	935	California Chicory Works	The River Mill at 1672 W. Bowman Road. 37°51′49″N 121°19′07″W	French Camp	
Carnegie	740	Carnegie	Carnegie State Vehicular Recreation Area; 37°37′59″N 121°32′37″W	Tracy	
Corral Hollow	755	Corral Hollow	Corral Hollow; 37°39′28″N 121°28′38″W	Tracy	
First landing place of sailing launch Comet	437	First landing place of sailing launch Comet	19000 S. Manthey Road Lathrop; 37°47′14″N 121°18′19″W	Tracy	
French Camp	668	French Camp	241 4th St, French Camp; 37°53′10″N 121°16′12″W	French Camp	
Lindsay Point	178	Lindsay Point	Civic Center at 425 North El Dorado Street; 37°57′26″N 121°17′30″W	Stockton	
Lockeford	365	Lockeford	Historic district 38°09′27″N 121°09′05″W	Lockeford	
Lodi Arch	931	Lodi Arch	E. Pine & S. Sacramento Streets; 38°08′03″N 121°16′15″W	Lodi	
Lone Star Mill	155	Lone Star Mill	Stillman Magee Regional Park; 38°12′15″N 121°05′31″W	Clements	
Mokelumne City	162	Mokelumne City	Cameron Road. and Thornton Road; 38°15′11″N 121°26′21″W	Thornton	
New Hope	436	New Hope	Ripon City Park, Fourth and Locust Streets. 37°44′09″N 121°07′37″W	Ripon	
Reuel Colt Gridley Monument	801	Reuel Colt Gridley Monument	Stockton Rural Cemetery; 37°58′39″N 121°17′11″W	Stockton	
San Joaquin City	777	San Joaquin City	North of county line on County Hwy J3; 37°40′N 121°16′W	Tracy	
Site of Completion of Pacific Railroad, First Transcontinental Railroad	780-7	Site of Completion of Pacific Railroad, First Transcontinental Railroad	At entrance to Mossdale Crossing Park and Ramp, just north of San Joaquin River (missing); 37°47′14″N 121°18′18″W	Lathrop	780-7, is number 7 in a series on the historic First Transcontinental Railroad - Western Pacific Railroad (1862–1870)
San Joaquin Valley College	520	San Joaquin Valley College	18500 N. Lilac Street; 38°09′00″N 121°18′15″W	Woodbridge	
Stockton Assembly Center	934	Stockton Assembly Center	San Joaquin County Fairgrounds; 37°56′18″N 121°16′06″W	Stockton	
Stockton Developmental Center	1016	Stockton Developmental Center	510 E. Magnolia Street; 37°57′51″N 121°17′12″W	Stockton	
Sikh Temple Site	1039	Sikh Temple Site	1930 Sikh Temple Street; 37°56′02″N 121°16′30″W	Stockton	
Temple Israel Cemetery	765	Temple Israel Cemetery	E. Acacia Street, between N. Pilgrim & N. Union Sts. 37°57′53″N 121°16′44″W	Stockton	
Trail of the John C. Fremont 1844 Expedition	995	Trail of the John C. Fremont 1844 Expedition	9599 CA-88; 38°03′09″N 121°11′22″W	Stockton	
Weber Point	165	Weber Point	Center Street, between Channel and Miner Sts. 37°57′19″N 121°17′32″W	Stockton	
Wood's Ferry & Wood's Bridge	163	Wood's Ferry & Wood's Bridge	Present bridge is approx location of original ferry and bridge, County Hwy Jl0; 38°09′26″N 121°17′52″W	Woodbridge	
Woodbridge	358	Woodbridge	Historic district 38°09′16″N 121°18′03″W	Woodbridge	

== See also ==
- List of California Historical Landmarks
- National Register of Historic Places listings in San Joaquin County, California
