= Weber Point Home =

Historical place in San Joaquin County, United States

Weber Point Home Weber Point Events Center
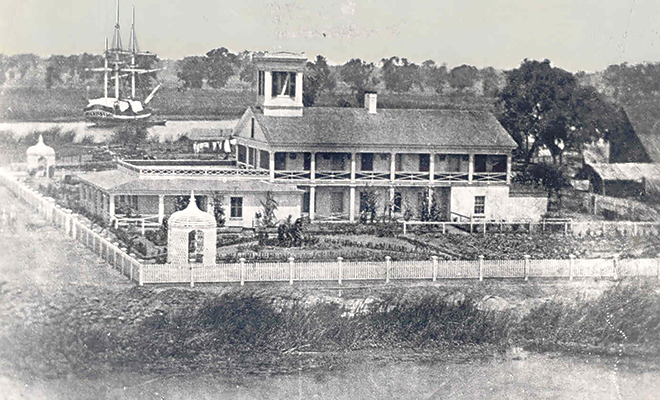
- Weber Point Home

- Location within California Location within the United States
- 37.964°N 121.278°W
- Location: Weber Point Event Center; 221 North Center Street, Stockton, California, U.S.

History
- Built: 1850

Site notes
- Architect: Carl David Maria Weber
- Architectural style: Adobe Monterey Colonial

California Historical Landmark
- Designated: January 11, 1935
- Reference no.: 165

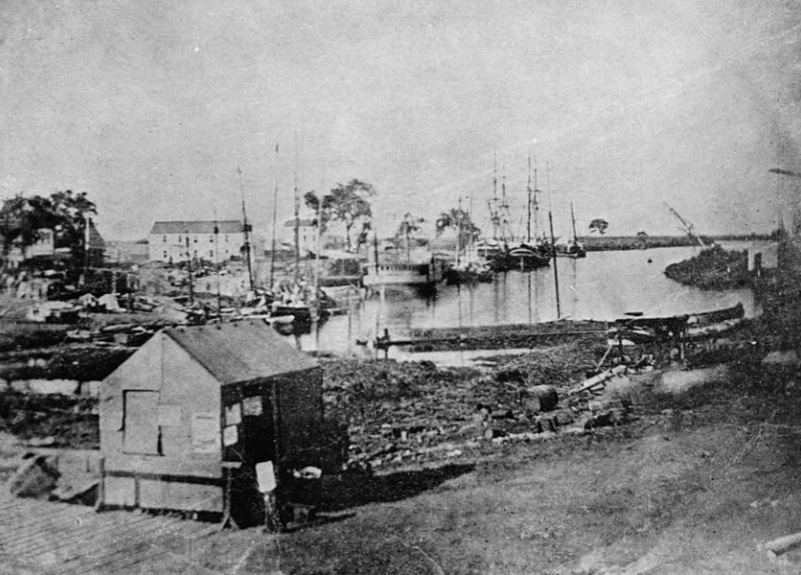
Stockton waterfront in 1853 at the Stockton Channel

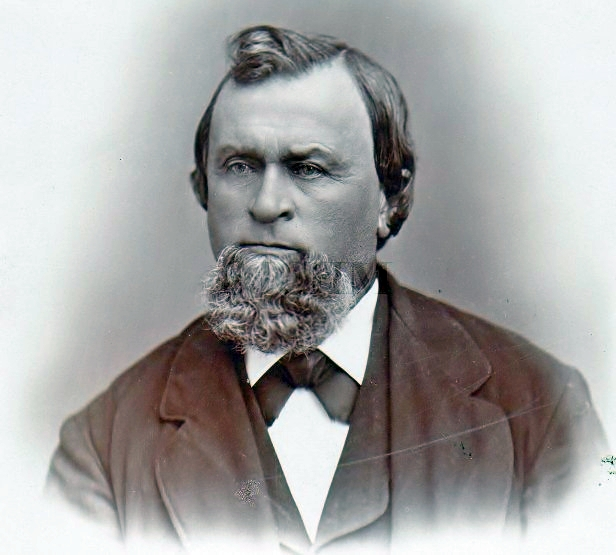
Carl David Maria Weber (1814–1881), founder of Stockton

Weber Point Home is a historical site in Stockton, California in San Joaquin County. The site of the former Weber Point Home is a California Historical Landmark No. 165, listed on January 11, 1935. The Weber Point Home was a built by Captain Carl David Maria Weber, founder of Stockton. Weber was pioneer of California and built a two-story adobe-and-redwood house in 1850. At the time it was the largest house in Stockton. The house was built on the east end of the Stockton Channel. The house was surrounded by landscaped gardens built for his new wife Helen Murphy. Weber lived in the house till his death in 1881. The house was located on Center Street between Channel and Miner Street in Stockton. The Weber Point House was destroyed in a fire in 1917. The Weber Point House was the center of the 8,747 acre Mexican land grant Rancho Campo de los Franceses. The Rancho owned present day Stockton and lands south and east, most of the current San Joaquin County.

== History ==
To build the Weber Point Home, Carl David Maria Weber (also known as Charles M. Weber I, and Carlos Maria Weber) purchased redwood lumber from Woodside near the Santa Cruz Mountains. Two lumber mills operated near the Santa Cruz Mountains. From the mills, redwood was brought by oxen pulled cart to Redwood City, then at San Francisco Bay taken up the San Joaquin River and the Stockton Channel to Weber Point by barge. The Great Flood of 1862 damaged the house and it was repaired. The Great Flood of 1881 also damaged the house and it was again repaired.

Weber came to in California in 1841 with the Bartleson–Bidwell Party, the first American emigrants arriving in covered wagons from Missouri to California. Weber joined William Gulnac, a Mexican citizen in 1842, and opened a business in San Jose. Weber became a Mexican citizen in 1845. That year, Weber was also able to acquire Gulnac's interest in El Rancho del Campo de los Franceses. When the War with Mexico broke out in April 1846, Weber declined to be commissioned a captain in the Mexican army, instead becoming a captain in the cavalry of the United States. Weber had planned a town "Tuleburg" (Too-lee-burg) but later decided on "Stockton" after Commodore Stockton, US Naval officer instrumental in seizing control of California from Mexico. Weber also profited from the California Gold Rush.

The historical marker was built by California State Department of Parks and Recreation in cooperation with the Stockton City Council and Cultural Heritage Board placed on July 10, 1976, at the Weber Point Events Center. The historical marker is about 450 feet east of where the house was.

Weber's only daughter, Julia Weber, built a house, the Weber Cottage, next to the Weber Point Home in 1892. Her house had a connecting corridor to the Weber Point Home. The Weber Cottage was moved to San Joaquin County Historical Museum at Micke Grove Park on November 9, 1984. The Weber Cottage is the oldest wooden building in San Joaquin County. Weber's sons, Charles Weber II, Thomas, and Julia built a new two-story Victorian home on Weber Point in 1881. Some of the glass, doors and windows from 1850 adobe home were used to build the 1881 home. The home was Julia new home. Julia moved the 1881 home and the 1892 Weber Cottage in 1900 to West Lane, just north of the Calaveras River, calling it Helen’s Oaks after her mother. The site is today called Helen's Oaks Circle road.

== Weber Point Event Center ==
The Weber Point Event Center is an 9.7-acre (39,000 m^{2}) open plaza and stage that is rented for city events and annual events, like: festivals, concerts, movie nights, and other of community events. Weber Point Event Center is on the east end of the Stockton Channel at 221 N. Center Street. Weber Point Event Center is managed by the City of Stockton Community Services Department. Weber Point Event Center also has: the Great Circle, step Amphitheater, children's play area, an interactive water feature, Point Amphitheater, and waterfront promenade.

== See also ==
- California Historical Landmarks in San Joaquin County
- Lindsay Point (Stockton, California)
