= Temple Israel (Stockton, California) =

Reform Jewish synagogue in Stockton, California, US

- Location in California

Religion
- Affiliation: Reform Judaism
- Ecclesiastical or organizational status: Synagogue
- Leadership: Rabbi Jason M. Gwasdoff
- Status: Active

Location
- Location: 5105 North El Dorado Street, Stockton, California 95207
- Country: United States
- Interactive map of Temple Israel
- Coordinates: 37°59′47″N 121°18′23″W

Architecture
- Type: Synagogue architecture
- Established: 1850 (as a congregation)
- Completed: 1855 (Miner and Hunter Streets); 1861 (Hunter Street #1); 1905 (Hunter Street #2); 1930 (Madison Street); 1960 (El Dorado Street)

Website
- templeisraelstockton.com

Temple Israel is a Reform Jewish congregation and synagogue, located at 5105 North El Dorado Street, in Stockton, California, in the United States. Established in 1850, it is one of the oldest Jewish congregations in California.

== History ==
The congregation was founded during the California Gold Rush as a Jewish society called Rhyim Ahovim (transliterated from Hebrew as "Loving Friends") by tradition in 1849 but documentably no later than 1850. Other sources say that the congregation was founded in 1851.

The first building, on Miner Avenue, between El Dorado and Hunter, was completed on August 28, 1855. It was a simple, frame structure built on brick foundations of wood that had been shipped around the Horn, since no sawmill yet existed in Stockton. During the flood of 1861-62, the building flooded with 2 feet (0.61 m) of water, causing the congregation to move it to higher ground on Hunter Street.

The rabbi, since 1993, is Rabbi Jason M. Gwasdoff.

== See also ==
- History of the Jews in the American West
- Oldest synagogues in the United States
- Temple Israel Cemetery, designated as California Historical Landmark No. 765
