= Lindsay Point (Stockton, California) =

Historical place in San Joaquin County, United States

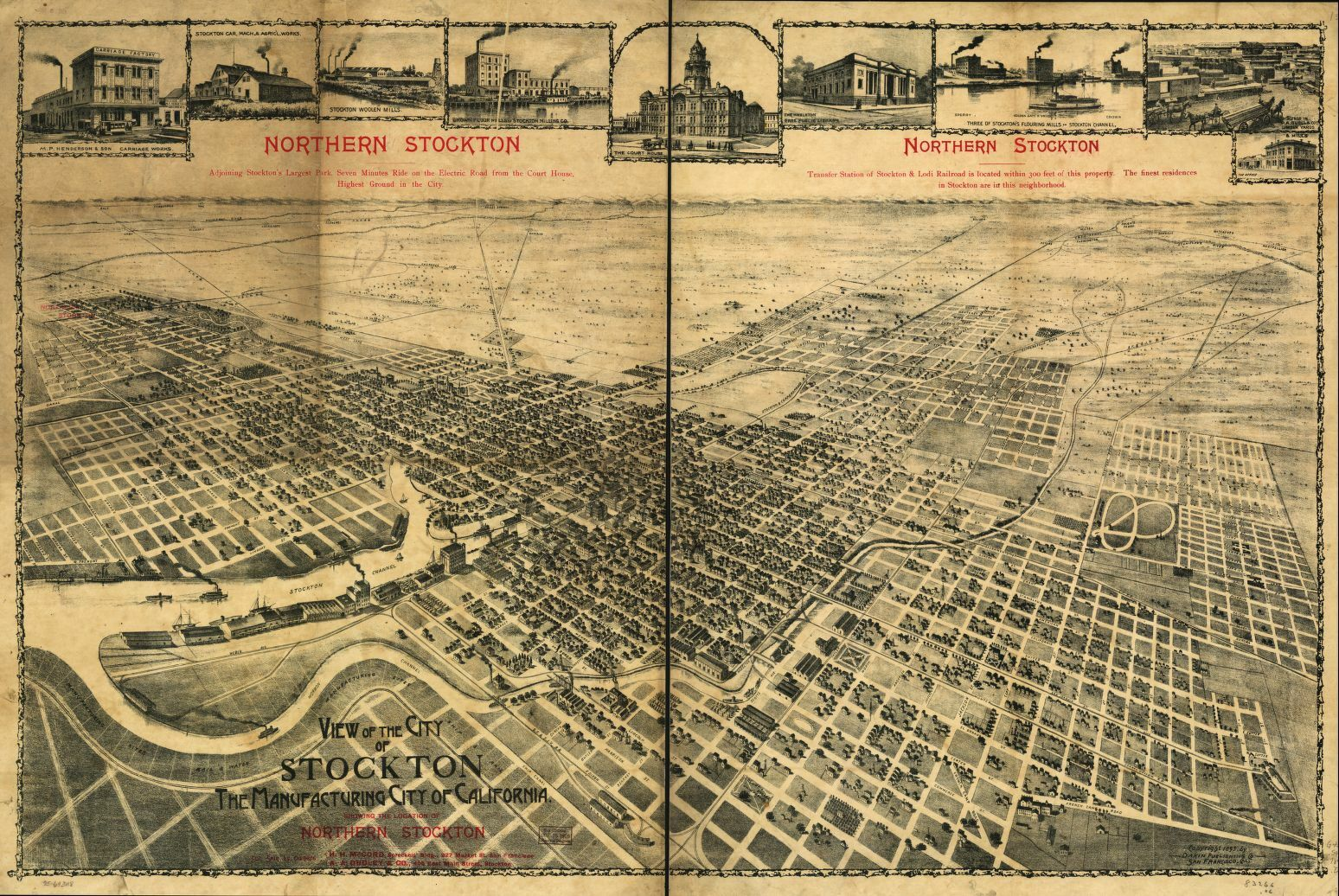
- City of Stockton in 1895, Lindsay Point is at the end of the Stockton Channel

- Location within California Location within the United States
- 37.957°N 121.291°W
- Location: 425 North El Dorado Street at Stockton City Hall

History
- Built: 1844

Site notes
- Architect: Thomas Lindsay
- Architectural style: Tule reed hut

California Historical Landmark
- Designated: March 6, 1935
- Reference no.: 178

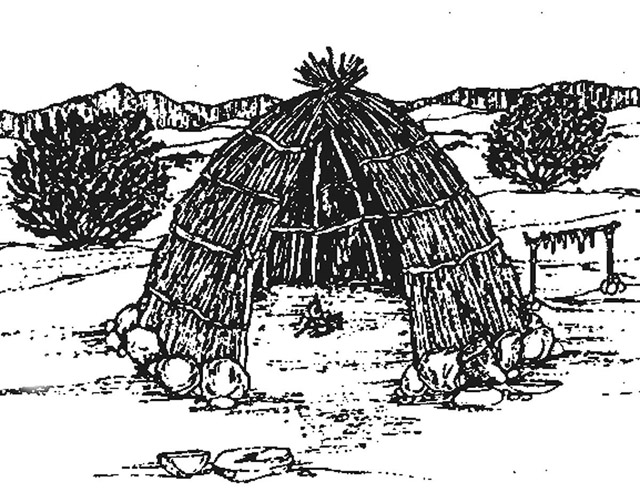
Tule reed hut like the one Thomas Lindsay build

Lindsay Point was the First Building in Stockton the site is a historical place in Stockton, California in San Joaquin County. Lindsay Point site is a California Historical Landmark No. 178, listed on March 6, 1935. The first settlers arrived at Rancho Campo de los Franceses in August 1844. One of the early settlers was Thomas Lindsay. Lindsay copied the natives and built a tule reed hut. Lindsay was later killed by natives and buried by other settlers. The Lindsay Point is the meeting site of McLeod Lake (Stockton Channel) and the Miner's Channel. Miner's Channel ran between Miner Street and Channel Street. Miner Street sometimes flood, so it was piped and filled in. In 2000 archaeologists did an excavation of the past site of Miner Channel and uncovered artifacts from 1890s to the 1930s. The excavation was done before the new Cineplex complex was built.

Rancho Campo de los Franceses was a 48,747-acre (197.27 km^{2}) Mexican land grant in the San Joaquin County, California. In 1844 by Mexican Governor Manuel Micheltorena granted the land to Guillermo Gulnac. The ranch was given the name Campo de los Franceses, because French-Canadian fur trappers who wintered there. Campo de los Franceses in English is “French Camp”. The Rancho Campo de los Franceses covered the present-day cites of French Camp and Stockton. The excavation was done before the new Cineplex complex was built.

A California Historical marker was placed at the Stockton City Hall by The State Department of Parks and Recreation in working with local civic and historical organizations on July 29, 1969.

== See also ==
- California Historical Landmarks in San Joaquin County
