= Lindsay Point =

Lindsay Point may refer to:

- Lindsay Point, Victoria, a locality in northwestern Victoria, Australia
- Lindsay Point (Stockton, California), a historical place in Stockton, California
