= Temple Israel Cemetery =

Temple Israel Cemetery may refer to:

- Temple Israel Cemetery (Stockton, California), a California Historical Landmark
- Temple Israel Cemetery (Wakefield, Massachusetts), listed on the NRHP in Massachusetts
- Temple Israel Cemetery (Omaha, Nebraska)
