= River Junction AVA =

American Viticultural Area in San Joaquin County, California

Coordinates: 37°40′46″N 121°14′30″W

River Junction
- Wine region
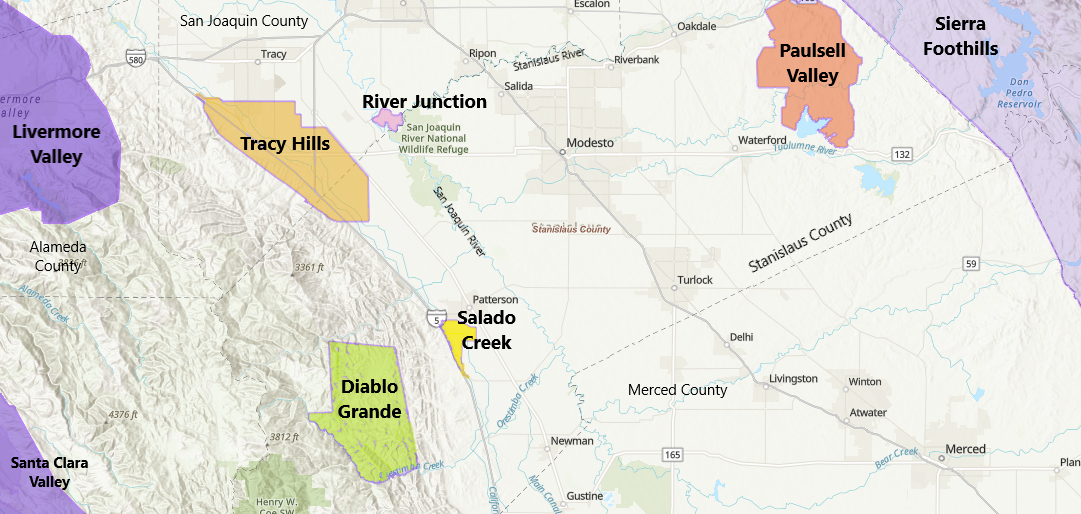
- San Joaquin & Stanislaus Counties AVAs
- Type: American Viticultural Area
- Year established: 2001
- Years of wine industry: 36
- Country: United States
- Part of: California, San Joaquin County
- Precipitation (annual average): 10–11 in (250–280 mm)]
- Soil conditions: Alluvial floodplains and sandy loam
- Total area: 1,300 acres (2.0 sq mi)
- Size of planted vineyards: 800+ acres (320+ ha)
- No. of vineyards: 1
- Grapes produced: Chardonnay, Cabernet Sauvignon, Merlot, Petite Syrah, Viognier and Zinfandel
- No. of wineries: 1

River Junction is an American Viticultural Area (AVA) located in southern San Joaquin County, California west of the city of Modesto. The area is located at the confluence of the San Joaquin and the Stanislaus Rivers about 35 miles (56 km) south of Lodi, around the city of Ripon. The wine appellation was established as the nation's 142^{nd}, the state's 85^{th} and the county's second AVA on May 9, 2001, by the Bureau of Alcohol, Tobacco and Firearms (ATF), Treasury after reviewing the petition submitted by Mr. Ronald W. McManis, owner of McManis Family Vineyards, proposing a new viticultural area in San Joaquin County to be known as "River Junction."
At the outset, the nation's smallest AVA was established on behalf of the McManis Family Vineyards, the only commercial winery in the appellation. River Junction viticultural area is cooler than surrounding areas of the Central Valley, and is the only place in the valley where high concentrations of fine sandy loam are found. 90% of the 1,300-acre (2.0 sq mi) viticultural area is planted with Chardonnay grapes. The plant hardiness zones are 9a and 9b.

== Name Evidence ==
The origin of the name, "River Junction," refers to the junction of the Stanislaus River with the San Joaquin River. Mr. McManis states, "The name is in prominent use within the AVA, undoubtedly because of the significant prehistoric, historic, and ongoing influence of the rivers' confluence on the immediate area." The petitioner owns a vineyard in the AVA. The property, purchased in the early 1990s, was previously known as "River Junction Vineyards." A vineyard block map of his ranch shows the historical ownership of the vineyards by the designation "R" for "River Junction Vineyards" located within the AVA. The name "River Junction" is also used for River Junction Reclamation District No. 2064, a State of California Special District dating from at least 1925. River Junction Reclamation District includes Bret Harte Gardens subdivision, filed October 11, 1922. Since this subdivision assumes reclamation within the District, it seems likely that "River Junction," as a District name, dates at least to 1922. The name is also used for River Junction Farms subdivision no. 2 within the River Junction Reclamation District.

== History ==
The Delta is a distinctive estuarine environment where freshwater and tidal ocean water meet. Based on tidal influence, geomorphology, and native vegetation, the Delta is an inland coastal environment. Estuaries are among the richest, most productive ecosystems on Earth and include diverse natural habitats and micro-environments. The tremendous fertility of Delta Estuary soils was recognized early in the settlement of California. Historically, the Delta was a vast marshland with adjacent uplands that underwent periodic flooding from winter rains and spring snow melt. Since 1850 over 90 percent of those wetlands have been reclaimed for agriculture, and have been administered by a variety of private individuals, public agencies, and Reclamation Districts.

Native Americans utilized the Delta area for at least 10,000 years, prior to the Spanish colonization. Local archeological sites are at least 5,000 years old. As late as the 1800s the Stanislaus - San Joaquin confluence area was inhabited by the Miwok. In 1810 Spanish armies explored the southern delta, and by 1820 British and French fur trappers had arrived. In 1832 the Hudson Bay Company established local camps. Following secularization of the Spanish Missions during the Mexican Period (1812–1846), large local land grants were given to Mexican citizens. In 1841, the first band of eastern overland immigrants crossed the Sierras, journeyed down the Stanislaus River, and headed north to Sutter's Fort. In the 1840s local land use, among land grant recipients and homesteaders, was primarily cattle grazing on upland grasslands, and the marshes were avoided. River commerce developed, by 1847 steamboats appeared on the Delta, and the Stanislaus River had regularly scheduled steamboat service.
Following U.S. acquisition of California from Mexico, the presence of gold was announced in 1848, resulting in an enormous influx of miners and settlers. Settlers soon realized that feeding the gold miners was more profitable than gold mining, for instance, locally-grown watermelons sold for $5 each, in gold-based 1849 dollars. Wheat was grown by 1850, and local agriculture increased to meet regional demands. Truck crops and orchards became extremely profitable.
Following the Federal Swamp and Overflow Act of 1850, wetlands title was transferred to the State of California with provision that proceeds from land sale would finance reclamation. Early reclamation efforts in the Delta consisted of artificial levees created with hand tools, and were less than successful. Farming was difficult, but high yields encouraged further reclamation efforts.
By the 1860s over 160,000 people, about half the state population, lived within the Delta drainage, and by the 1880s much wheat was grown locally. By the turn of the century power dredges were available and reclamation districts appeared, leading to permanent local land-use for agriculture. In the 1960s the Army Corps of Engineers began major levee improvements and reclamation. As of 1992, 586,000 acres (916 sq mi) in San Joaquin County were used for irrigated crops and pasture, of which about 132,000 acres were in use for fruit and nut crops. In recent years fruits, including wine grapes and table grapes, have become major local crops.
The earliest settlement in San Joaquin County was located just outside River Junction Viticultural Area, approximately 1 1/2 miles (2.4 km) north of the mouth of the Stanislaus River, just north of Division Road. It was the Valley's first known agricultural site, the historic New Hope Agricultural Colony, established in 1846 by twenty Mormon pioneers who arrived from Brooklyn by ship.
The historic site, San Joaquin City, was established in 1849, west of San Joaquin River and about .4 miles (0.64 km) SSW of the northwest corner of the River Junction area. It was founded on the west bank of San Joaquin River as a riverboat terminal, between two ferry crossings, but due to a shift in the location of the river since then, this site is no longer at the river's edge.
The northwest corner of the area was also the site of Durham Ferry where gold miners crossed the San Joaquin en route to the Sierras. As might be expected from its slightly higher topography, Airport Way (aka Durham Ferry Road) apparently was a historic road or trail striking northeast from Durham Ferry.
Following the Federal Swampland Act of 1850, reclamation of wetlands was begun. The area was designated as a State Reclamation District, River Junction Reclamation District No. 2064. Subdivision survey maps were filed in 1922 for Bret Harte Gardens subdivision, and 1925 for River Junction Farms subdivision no's. 2 and 3. Since reclamation, use of the River Junction area has been primarily agricultural. Recent crops have included asparagus, tomatoes, almonds, alfalfa, corn, and wine grapes. The area was also used for limited livestock grazing and dairying.
Present agricultural use of the area is primarily 700 acres (280 ha) of Chardonnay grapes. An additional 40 acres (16 ha) are planted to Cabernet grapes. Corn, alfalfa, and tomatoes are also grown. Aside from wine grapes, the only other permanent crop in the area is a single almond orchard. The large vineyard, owned by RJM Enterprises, has riparian water rights and currently pumps from the San Joaquin. As of 1996, permanent crops grown north of Division Road, outside the River Junction area, include about 40 acres (16 ha) of almonds and walnuts (two separate parcels), and 10 acres (4.0 ha) of grapes located a mile to the northeast.

== Terroir ==
=== Topography ===
The petitioner supplied the following topographical evidence to show that the area is distinct from surrounding areas:

(a) South, east and west boundaries

The River Junction viticultural area is bounded on the west by relatively steep slopes and the San Joaquin River, and is bounded on the south and east by gentle, nearly flat topography and the Stanislaus River. The area is locally unique in terms of topography: Its gentle, persistent southwest slope and higher boundaries form a shallow, slightly tilted bowl about 18 to 25 feet (5.5–7.6 m) in elevation at the center. Original natural boundaries to the west, south and east have been exaggerated by engineered, permanent levees that range from about 35 to 42 feet (11–13 m) in elevation. Geographical analyses, provided by the petitioner, show a transect through the River Junction viticultural area and illustrate the elevation differences that distinguish it.

(b) Northern boundary
The northern boundary of the area is an abrupt, natural elevation change at about the 29-foot (8.8 m) contour, delineated by Division Road. Physical evidence indicates that Division Road was placed on the upper side of a preexisting natural river terrace boundary. The topographic change marked by the road exactly follows geologic and soil type boundaries extending from the east to the center of section 7 on the Ripon, CA quadrangle map T3S/R7E and westward to Airport Way. The natural extension of "Red Bridge Slough" to the northwest is further evidence that this boundary is a natural river terrace.

(c) Northwest boundary

The northwest boundary of the River Junction viticultural area is delineated by Airport Way, a subtle natural high that is exaggerated by the raised roadbed. Elevation ranges from about 29 to 35 feet (8.8–10.7 m). Available geologic and historic evidence strongly supports the conclusion that, like Division Road, Airport Way follows a natural topographic high. The U.S.G.S. maps submitted by the petitioner show two separate sloughs draining from the Airport Way/Division Road intersection. An unnamed slough on the U.S.G.S. Ripon, CA quadrangle map drains southeast through the River Junction viticultural area, while the other slough, called "Red Bridge Slough" on the U.S.G.S. Vernalis, CA quadrangle map, flows in the opposite direction. A 1925 Reclamation District Map ("southern part") provided by the petitioner also shows the two sloughs. These two sloughs coincide with occurrences of Merritt soils, which fan out to the northwest and southeast of the Airport Way/Division Road intersection. This provides further evidence that the intersection of Airport Way and Division Road has historically sat on naturally higher topography from which the soils accumulated downhill in two directions.

=== Climate ===
The River Junction viticultural area is shown on a Sacramento–San Joaquin River Delta map submitted by the petitioner and is within the boundaries of the aforementioned d elta, at the southeastern most tip. The petitioner claims that the southernmost edge of the Sacramento-San Joaquin River Delta is more modified by inland weather patterns than other parts of the Delta. This part of the Delta experiences more extreme high and low temperatures, although still receiving maritime influence. The River Junction viticultural area is at the boundary between coastal and continental weather influence. It is subject to little rainfall, 10 to 11 inches (250 to 280 mm) per year, and at its southernmost part lies within the rain shadow of the coast ranges to the west. This is the driest part of the Delta and can be considered as arid to semiarid with coastal influence. The petitioner states that, as would be expected of a topographical depression, the local microclimate of the River Junction viticultural area is singular. The viticultural area is distinctively cooler than the immediate surrounding areas of Modesto, Stockton, Tracy Carbona, Tracy Pumping Plant and Rivercrest Vineyards in Ripon. Temperature data from 1995 and 1996 were recorded by a weather station located near the center of the River Junction viticultural area, at Rivercrest Vineyards. The monthly-averaged data, provided by the petitioner, show that minimum temperatures are consistently slightly cooler than elsewhere in the region, especially in summer. Average high temperatures are similar to Antioch and Lodi, which are significantly closer to the Suisun and San Francisco Bays and would be expected to experience more coastal cooling. According to the petitioner, average low temperatures are generally the coolest among Tracy Carbona and Tracy Pumping Plant. Significantly, minimum August temperatures are 2 to 5 degrees cooler than Tracy, Stockton, and Modesto. Grapes grown here are also subject to seasonally late frosts.

=== Soil ===
The petitioner provided the following evidence regarding the soil composition of the River Junction viticultural area:

(a) Formation and distribution of local soils
The River Junction viticultural area contains soils that are generally grouped as alluvial, and which formed on the geologic parent material of recent river channel deposits that are exposed in, and partly define, the viticultural area. Soils that formed on the stream channel deposits and derived from these deposits, are similar to one another in nature, and are characteristic of the parent sedimentary deposits. These soils are identified as "recent alluvial floodplains soils" and "delta and floodplains soils" in the U.S. Department of Agriculture soils reports for San Joaquin and Stanislaus counties. Where the Stanislaus River joins the San Joaquin River, bounding topography is steeper to the west and flatter to the east, thus restricting the westward limits of soils. West of the San Joaquin River, northeast facing slopes limit alluvial soils to an area only about 1/2 mile (0.80 km) or less in width. These soils, primarily Merritt-Columbia-Dello series and Dospalos-Bolfar complex, are bounded on the west by basin soils of the Willows-Pescadero series and terrace soils of the Capay series. Conversely, east of the San Joaquin River, flatter topography has allowed alluvial soils to accumulate to a width of 1 to 1 1/2 miles (1.6 to 2.4 km). South of the Stanislaus River there are mostly Columbia-Temple series soils, bounded by basin soils of the Waukena-Fresno association, and alluvial fan soils of the Modesto-Chualar group that extend eastward. North of the Stanislaus River, elevation is slightly higher than to the south, and topography is nearly flat but includes subtle northwest-facing and more strongly expressed southwest-facing slopes. Here the alluvial soils reach 1 1/2 miles (2.4 km) in width and are composed of Merritt-Grangeville-Columbia series with lesser amounts of Dello and Egbert soils. They are bounded to the east by terrace soil groups, primarily of the Delhi-Veritas-Tinnin series.

(b) Unique soil composition
The River Junction viticultural area is a mix of soils that differs from the surrounding areas. Among the total soils, nearly one-half are sandy types, and about one-fourth of the total is fine sandy loam of the Grangeville series. Soil types include about 25 percent Grangeville fine sandy loam; about 50 percent Merritt silty clay loam; nearly 25 percent Columbia fine sandy loams; and less than 1 percent Veritas silty clay loam. None of the surrounding areas has nearly as high a ratio between sandy loam to clay loam soils. Grangeville sandy loam is unusual in this part of the southern delta. The single other local occurrence of Grangeville sandy loam soil is west of the San Joaquin River, 1 1/2 miles (2.4 km) northwest, and is less than 11 acres (4.5 ha) in area. The petitioner states that Grangeville and Columbia series are formed in alluviums derived from granitic rock sources and the Merritt series is formed in alluviums from mixed rock sources. The Grangeville, Merritt, and Columbia series of soils are characterized as "prime farmland." These soils are all very deep, less well drained, and have moderate to high water capacity. Permeability ranges from moderately slow in the Merritt series to rapid in the Columbia and Grangeville series. They occupy nearly flat areas at low elevation and are occasionally flooded. They are exceedingly fertile soils that are capable of supporting wine grapes, almonds, tomatoes, sugar beets, wheat and other crops. Grapes have been grown on Columbia soils, but apparently, in San Joaquin County at least, have not been previously grown on bottomlands with Grangeville and Merritt. Soil samples collected on-site at the proposed viticultural area during October 1997 include one sample from each of the dominant units. According to the petitioner, brief low-power microscopic analysis from each of these samples indicated similar texture and composition. All samples contained abundant angular quartz grains and mica flakes, indicating granitic origin. These soils are mineralogically young and should be expected to be very high in available minerals.

(c) Comparisons with surrounding areas

The petitioner states that the River Junction viticultural area is clearly distinct from all potentially comparable adjacent local tracts, including the Red Bridge Slough, Walthall Slough, and Northeast areas. As would be expected of deposits formed along rivers, downstream alluvial soils have a wider distribution than does their parent alluvial substrate, due to stream transport, while upstream the derived soils are less widely distributed than the underlying stream channel deposits. In the River Junction viticultural area, derived alluvial soils strictly overlap but do not extend beyond their parent recent river deposits. The strict relationship between the channel deposits and their derived soils in the proposed area results in a strikingly distinct northern boundary. The location of these soil changes corresponds to the location of a strongly expressed terrace (distinct change in elevation) which angles northwest from the Stanislaus River near its mouth. Its upper side is nearly exactly followed by Division Road. This terrace probably marks the highest flood stage in historically recent times and suggests that soils in the area are probably derived from Stanislaus River alluvium. This would explain the distinctively high granitic content of these soils as compared with the surrounding area. The petitioner states that, in the Red Bridge Slough area (north of the area's boundary following Airport Way), overlap of alluvial soils with parent channel deposits is less exact and the soils are restricted to the west of the Slough. This tract has a slight northwest slope and, based on field observation, is wetter than the River Junction viticultural area. It has no strongly expressed northern or eastern boundaries, and thus would have less temperature extremes than the area due to the absence of topographic enclosure. The Red Bridge Slough area also has different soils than the River Junction viticultural area. It contains about 35 percent Columbia loam. At its center it includes 10 percent Egbert silty clay loam. No Grangeville sands are present. The tract is part of River Junction Reclamation District No. 2064, recorded as River Junction Farms subdivision no. 3 in 1925. Durham Ferry State Recreation Area occupies about 20 percent of the tract, and the remaining part is essentially flat at 20–25-foot (6.1–7.6 m) elevation. Southeast of Walthall Slough, located north of the Red Bridge Slough area, the relationship between channel deposits and derived soils is obscure. Here the soils occupy a larger expanse than do the underlying stream deposits. They include nearly 40 percent Columbia soils and about 20 percent Dello clay loam. No Grangeville sands are present. Topographically, this area is essentially flat to slightly northwest sloping. In terms of soils and the microclimate that would be inferred from the flat and open topography, it is completely different from the proposed viticultural area. To the northeast, recent river alluvium still underlies the soils but soils in this area include about 20 percent Veritas and Manteca series. No Grangeville sands are present. Otherwise, the Merritt and Columbia soils percentages are comparable to the River Junction viticultural area. However, this area is higher and flatter, averaging about 30–35 feet (9.1–10.7 m) elevation, and has no distinct topographic boundaries.
