= Lone Star Mill =

Historical place in San Joaquin County, United States

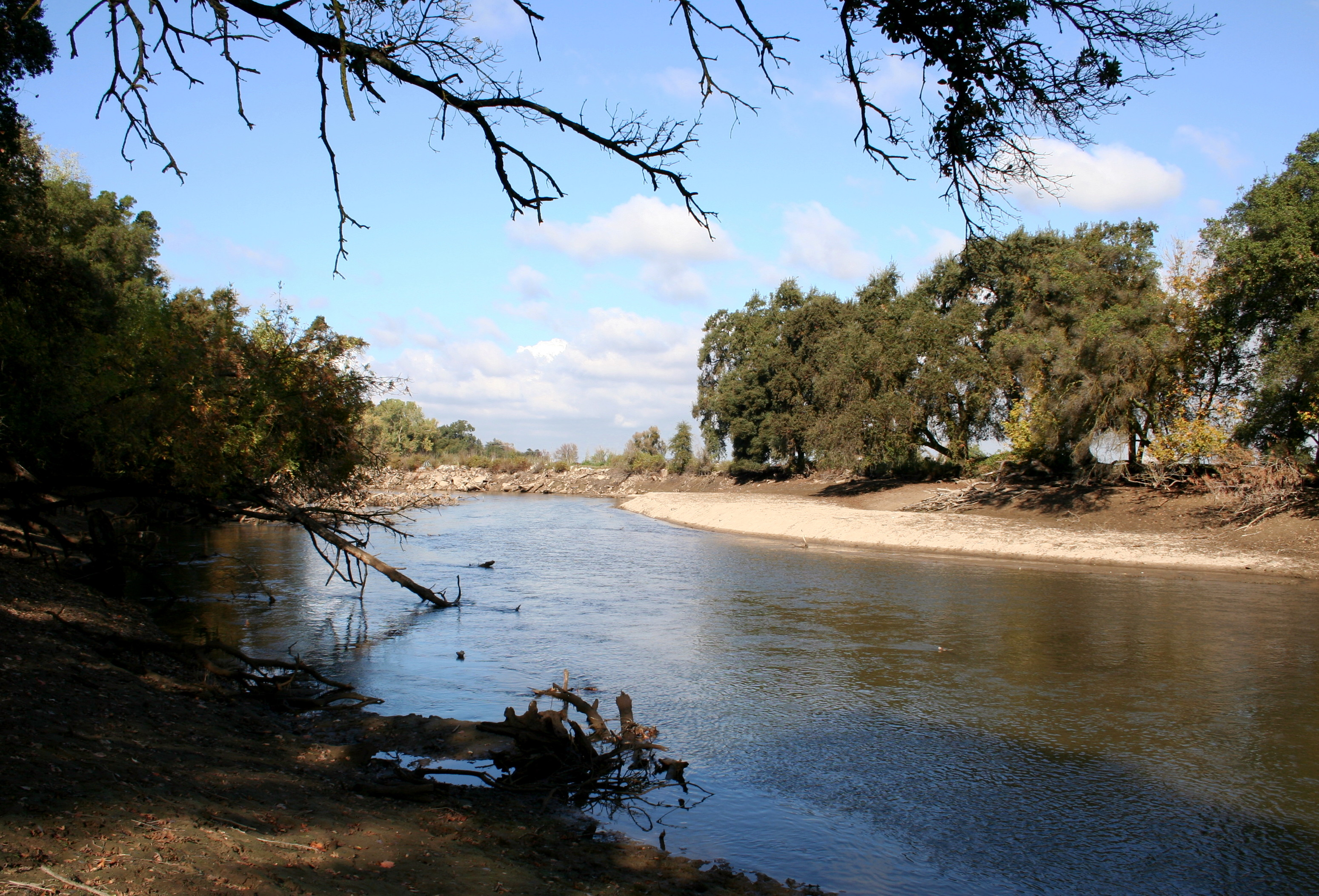
- Mokelumne River near Lone Star Mill

- Location within California Location within the United States
- 37.957°N 121.291°W
- Location: 23801 N Mackville Road, Clements, California

History
- Built: 1852

Site notes
- Architect: Thomas Lindsay
- Architectural style: Tule reed hut

California Historical Landmark
- Designated: Jan. 11, 1935
- Reference no.: 155

Lone Star Mill is a historical building in Clements, California in San Joaquin County. Lindsay Point site is a California Historical Landmark No. 155, listed on Jan. 11, 1935.

The Lone Star Mill was built in 1852 on the Mokelumne River. In 1854 the mill was moved to nearby David S. Terry's ranch. In 1855 a flour mill was added to the mill, In 1856 the mill caught fire and was burnt to the ground. The mill was rebuilt in 1856 and still stand. S.L. Magee purchased the mill and operated the mill till 1881. The Lone Star Mill closed in 1881 due to lack of business. The site was abandoned for years. The mill is at 3801 North Mackville Road in Clements, California, near Stillman L. Magee Park.

Historical marker was placed at the site by the Clements 4-H Club in 1950.

== See also ==
- California Historical Landmarks in San Joaquin County
