= Clements, California =

Unincorporated community in California, United States

- Unincorporated community
- Location within California Location within the United States
- Coordinates: 38°11′27″N 121°05′18″W
- Country: United States
- State: California
- County: San Joaquin
- Elevation: 138 ft (42 m)

Population
  - Total: 857
- Time zone: UTC-8 (Pacific (PST))
  - Summer (DST): UTC-7 (PDT)
- ZIP code: 95227
- Area code: 209
- GNIS feature ID: 221206

Clements is an unincorporated community in San Joaquin County, California, United States. Clements is located on California State Route 12 and California State Route 88, 11 miles (18 km) east-northeast of Lodi. Clements has a post office with ZIP code 95227.

== History ==
Clements was laid out in about 1872. The founder, Thomas Clements, gave the community his name. A post office has been in operation at Clements since 1882.

The Clements Stampede is a rodeo that began in 1942. Its original purpose was to raise funds for Marines during World War II. The annual rodeo was cancelled in 2011, and then was revived in 2025.

== See also ==
- Lone Star Mill (San Joaquin County, California)
- California Historical Landmarks in San Joaquin County
- IOOF Lodge No. 355
