= IOOF Lodge No. 355 =

- IOOF Lodge #355
- U.S. National Register of Historic Places
- Location within California Location within the United States
- Location: 18819 East CA 88, Clements, California
- Coordinates: 38°11′30″N 121°5′6″W
- Area: 1.1 acres (0.45 ha)
- NRHP reference No.: 07000085
- Added to NRHP: March 1, 2007

The IOOF Lodge No. 355, also known as the Clements Odd Fellows Hall, in Clements, California is a two-story brick building that was listed on the National Register of Historic Places in 2007.

The International Order of Odd Fellows group in Clements was established in 1889, seven years after the San Joaquin-Sierra Nevada Railroad reached the area and the town was founded. The charter members included a blacksmith, a rancher, a butcher, and a clerk. It met in a community hall above the blacksmith shop, then later met over the Clements store. It purchased land in 1917 and built this building the same year.

It is significant "as the social hub for the town of Clements" for many years.
