= Stockton Channel =

Stockton Channel - McLeod lake
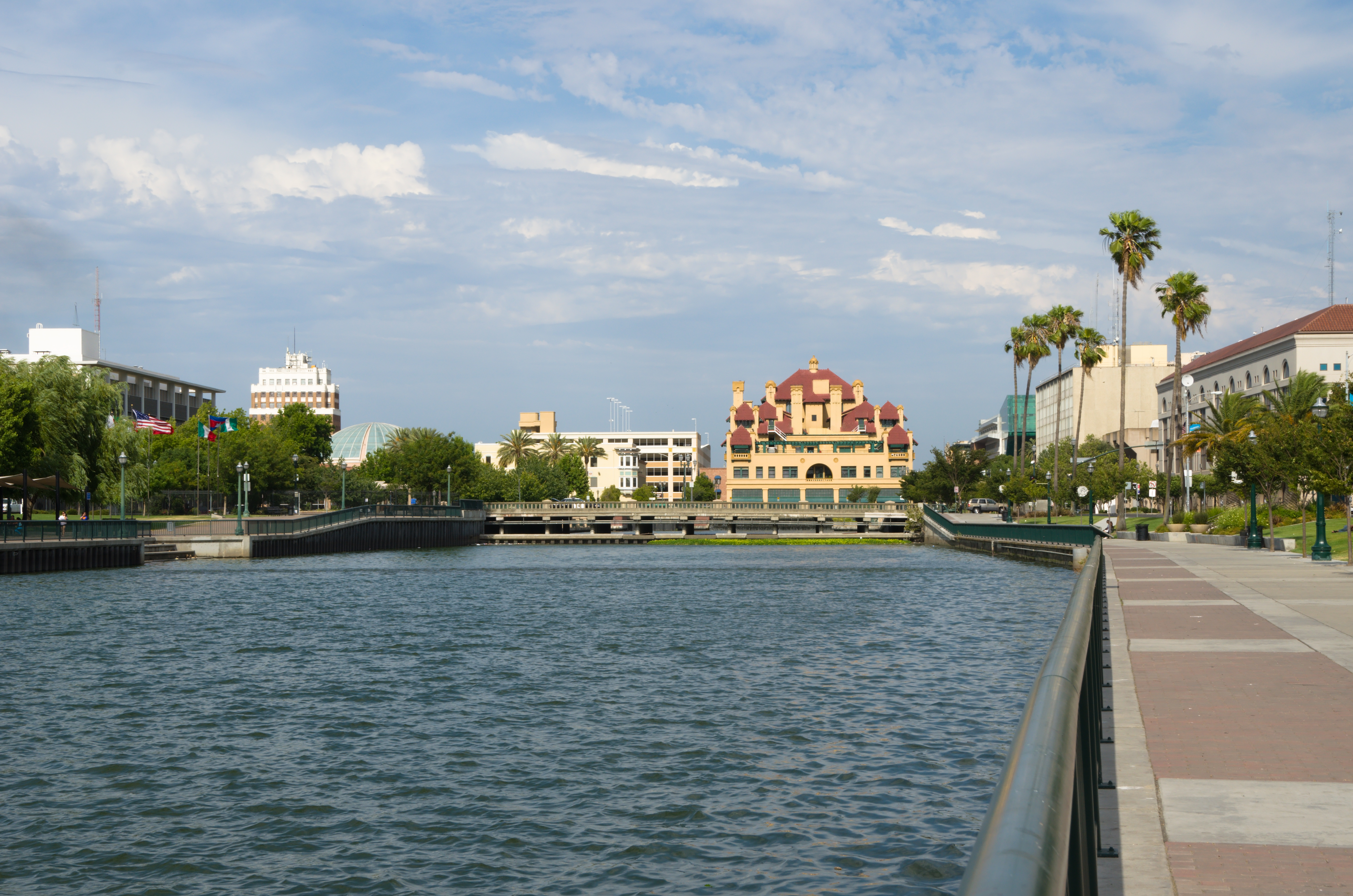
- Stockton Channel at Downtown Stockton's waterfront, June 2013

Location
- Country: United States
- State: California

Physical characteristics
- Source
  - location: San Joaquin River
  - elevation: 13 ft (4.0 m)
- Mouth
  - location: Port of Stockton; Stockton, California
  - coordinates: 37.953°N 121.32°W
- Length: 2.5 mi (4.0 km)
- Width
  - minimum: 200 ft (61 m)
  - maximum: 380 ft (120 m)
- Depth
  - minimum: 9 ft (2.7 m)
  - maximum: 35 ft (11 m)

Basin features
- River system: Sacramento–San Joaquin Delta
- Bridges: Interstate 5
- Inland ports: Port of Stockton; Stockton Marina

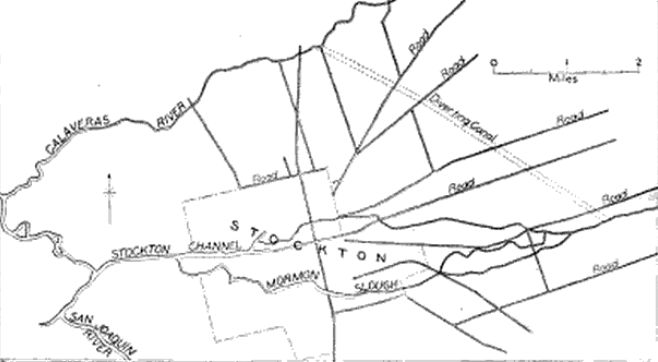
Map from 1910, showing the Stockton Channel and the San Joaquin River

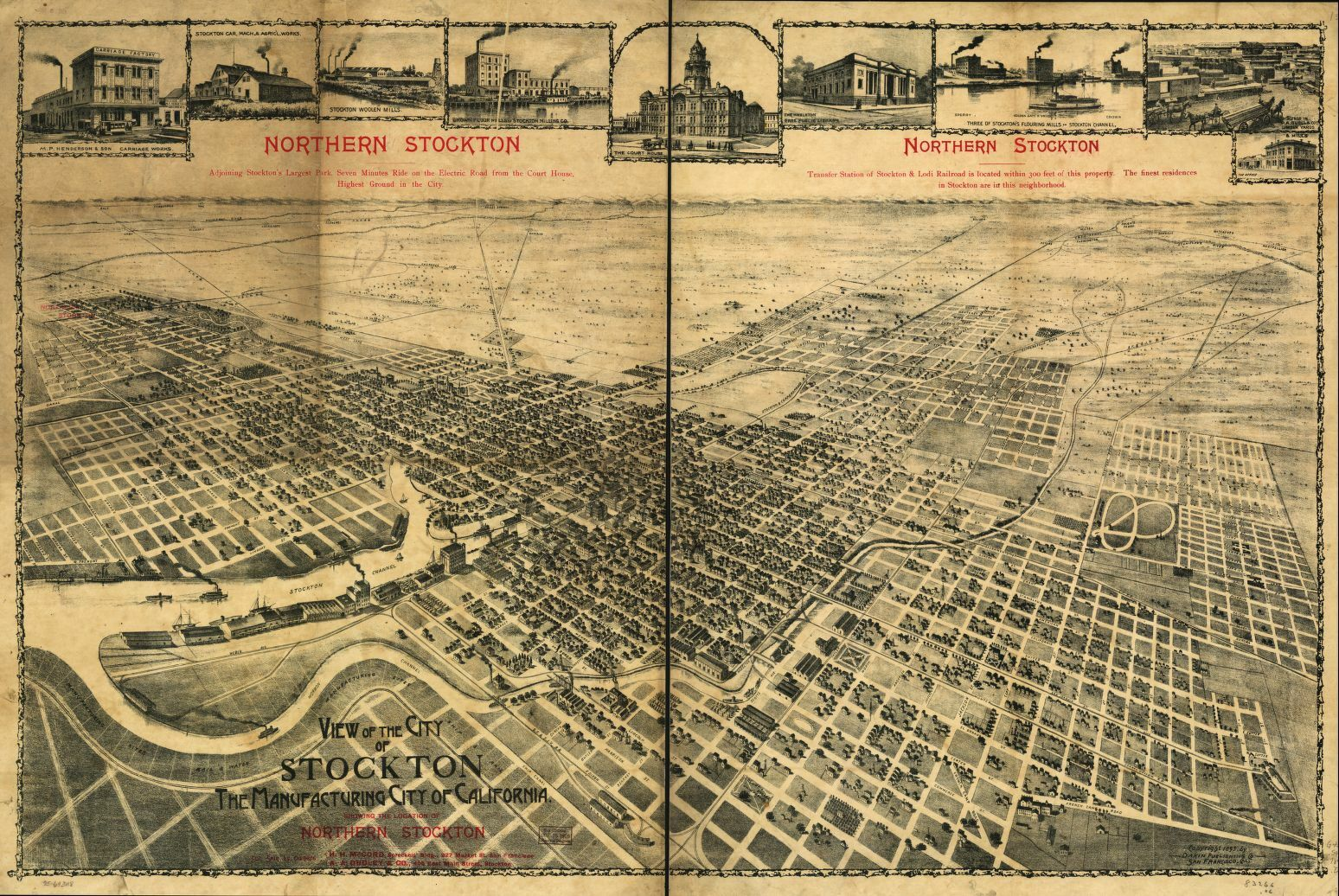
City of Stockton in 1895, Stockton Channel with steam ships and sailboats

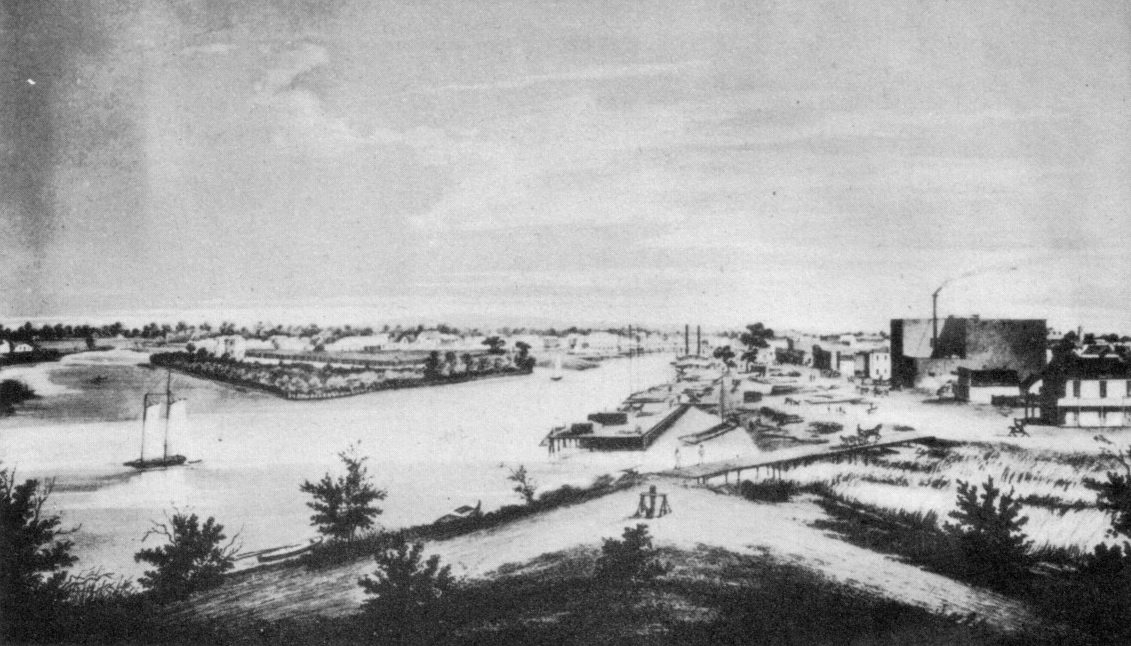
Stockton, circa 1860.

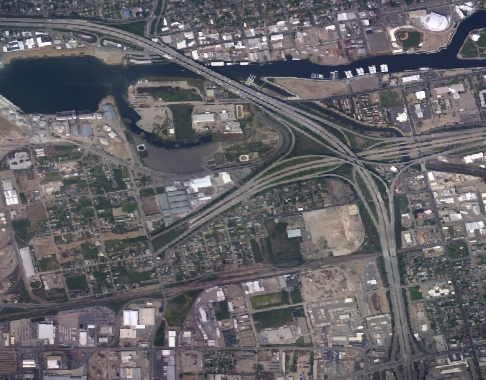
Stockton California 2012 aerial view

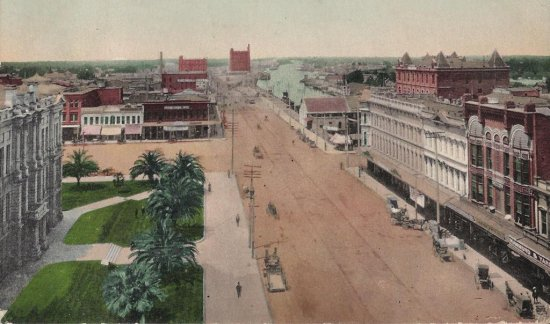
Postcard from 1909 Weber Ave, Stockton in background

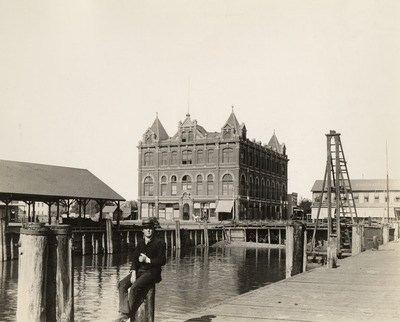
Stockton Channel in 1890 with Masonic Temple in background

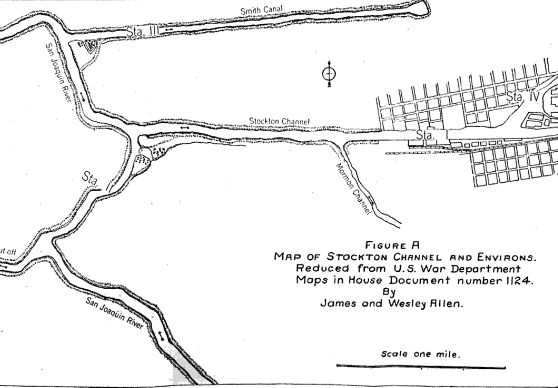
Stockton Channel 1921

Stockton Channel (or Stockton Waterfront) is a waterway in California's Sacramento–San Joaquin River Delta. It runs 2.5 miles from the San Joaquin River-Stockton Deepwater Shipping Channel at the Port of Stockton to McLeod Lake in Downtown Stockton. The Stockton Channel is contained by levees, with Miners Levee on the north side and Tuleburg Levee on the south side. Mormon Slough branches off the Stockton Channel to the southeast. The Smith Channel runs parallel to the north of the Stockton Channel. Interstate 5 crosses the Channel at its midpoint.

The Stockton Channel overflowed its banks in the great flood of 1955. San Joaquin County was named a federal disaster area. The 1955 flood remained the largest San Joaquin County flood on record until 1997.

United States Army Corps of Engineers performs annual maintenance on the Stockton Channel, which includes dredging to remove silt. A dam on Mormon Slough was built to stop flooding and silt build up in the Stockton Channel. The Dam was removed on 24 October 2016.

McLeod Lake is named after Alexander Roderick McLeod who came to Stockton from Hudson Bay to trap beaver.

== On the Stockton Channel ==
Features along the Stockton Channel - Stockton Waterfront include:

- 5 Star Marina
- Banner Island Ballpark, homefield of the Stockton Ports
- Children's Museum of Stockton
- Dean DeCarli Waterfront Plaza
- Delta Yacht Club
- Ebony Boat Club
- Hunter Square Plaza
- Joan Darrah Promenade
- Morelli Park
- Penny Newman Grain Company
- The Port of Stockton
- Stockton Cement Terminal
- Stockton Downtown Marina
- Stockton Waterfront Events Center
- Weber Point Event Center
- McLeod Park
- McLeod Lake Plaza
- Stockton Arena, home venue of the Stockton Heat and Stockton Kings
- Stockton Memorial Civic Auditorium
- University Plaza Waterfront Hotel
- Weber Institute of Applied Sciences & Technology

== Historical landmarks on Stockton Channel ==
Historical landmarks on Stockton Channel include:

- The Hotel Stockton (1910), 133 E Weber Ave, Stockton Weber and El Dorado streets. Constructed in a Mission/Spanish Revival style by local businessmen Lee A. Phillips, Frank A. West, Samuel Frankenheimer, and Edgar B. Brown (architect), the hotel was constructed on a parcel known as "Weber Hold," at the head of the Stockton Channel. As the first reinforced concrete structure in the Central Valley, the hotel was constructed at a cost of $500,000. When it opened for business on May 25, 1910, it included 252 rooms (200 with private baths) and a roof garden with a fountain and pergola. The hotel underwent an extensive renovation in 1950 at a cost of $200,000, but was the victim of poor timing. The increasing use of automobiles led to more convenient roadside motels with ample parking, and rising costs, led the hotel to close on November 26, 1960. For a number of years, the building was home to numerous county offices, including the Department of Public Assistance, due to the demolition of the old courthouse. However, the county offices vacated in 1992 when they moved into new facilities. Since then, the old hotel has been restored, and officially reopened to the public on March 17, 2005; it features exact replicas of the oak railings and wainscoting, the original fireplace, and restored leaded stained glass panels. The upper floors now contain 156 apartments for low- and fixed-income residents, as well as a 10,000-square-foot (930 m^{2}) rooftop terrace. The building is #81000174 on the National Register of Historic Places and was added on April 1, 1981. The building was added to the city register by resolution number 29,086 on June 1, 1971.
- Miner Channel Historic Block - The site was added to the city register by resolution number 33,837 on January 31, 1977. The block bounded by Miner Avenue and Channel, Hunter, and El Dorado streets was excavated in 2000 as part of the construction of the City Centre Cineplex. Archaeologists found intact materials in Miner Channel. The largest cluster was from a laundry operated by Chinese Immigrants.
- Stockton Memorial Civic Auditorium (1924–25), 525 North Center Street. The city of Stockton constructed the Civic Auditorium as a venue for large community events, prompted by plans to commemorate the Stockton men who had been killed in World War I. The city wanted to create a central plaza fringed by the auditorium, the city hall, and the library, and decided on a site near McLeod Lake. A bond election was held in October 1920 to raise funds for site purchase and construction. Designed by Glenn Allen and the firm of Wright & Satterlee, construction began in 1924, was completed in 1925, and dedicated on Veteran's Day. The finished structure featured exterior brick walls with cement plaster finish (imitating Indiana limestone), interior brick walls covered with reinforced concrete or metal lath and plaster, roof and balcony of reinforced concrete, floors of white maple over a concrete sub-floor, and a roof of "Armso" iron over felt. It contains a 45' x 96' stage, twelve dressing rooms, nine committee rooms, a press room, and two dressing rooms for the lecture room stage. The building can accommodate 5,000 people, and was added to the city register by resolution number 90-0198 on March 15, 1990. Allen & Young are also known for the Henry Apartments (1913), Goold and John's Tudor Flats (1924) at 938-944 North Sutter Street, First Church of Christ Scientist (1928), and the Jewish Community Center (1928).

== Past properties on the Stockton Channel ==
Past major properties on the Stockton Channel:

- Stockton Ordnance Depot
- Pollock-Stockton Shipbuilding Company
- Pacific Tannery
- Jacob Wagner Tannery
- Stockton harbor
- Lindsay Point, by Thomas Lindsay
- 1850 House built by Captain Charles Maria Weber, founder and pioneer (at Weber Point)
- Old Masonic Temple on El Dorado Street

== Gallery ==
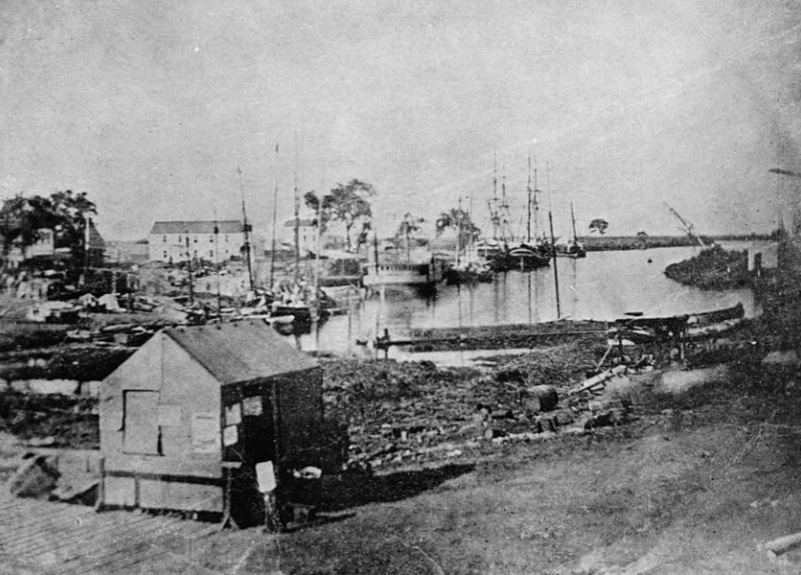
Stockton waterfront in 1853

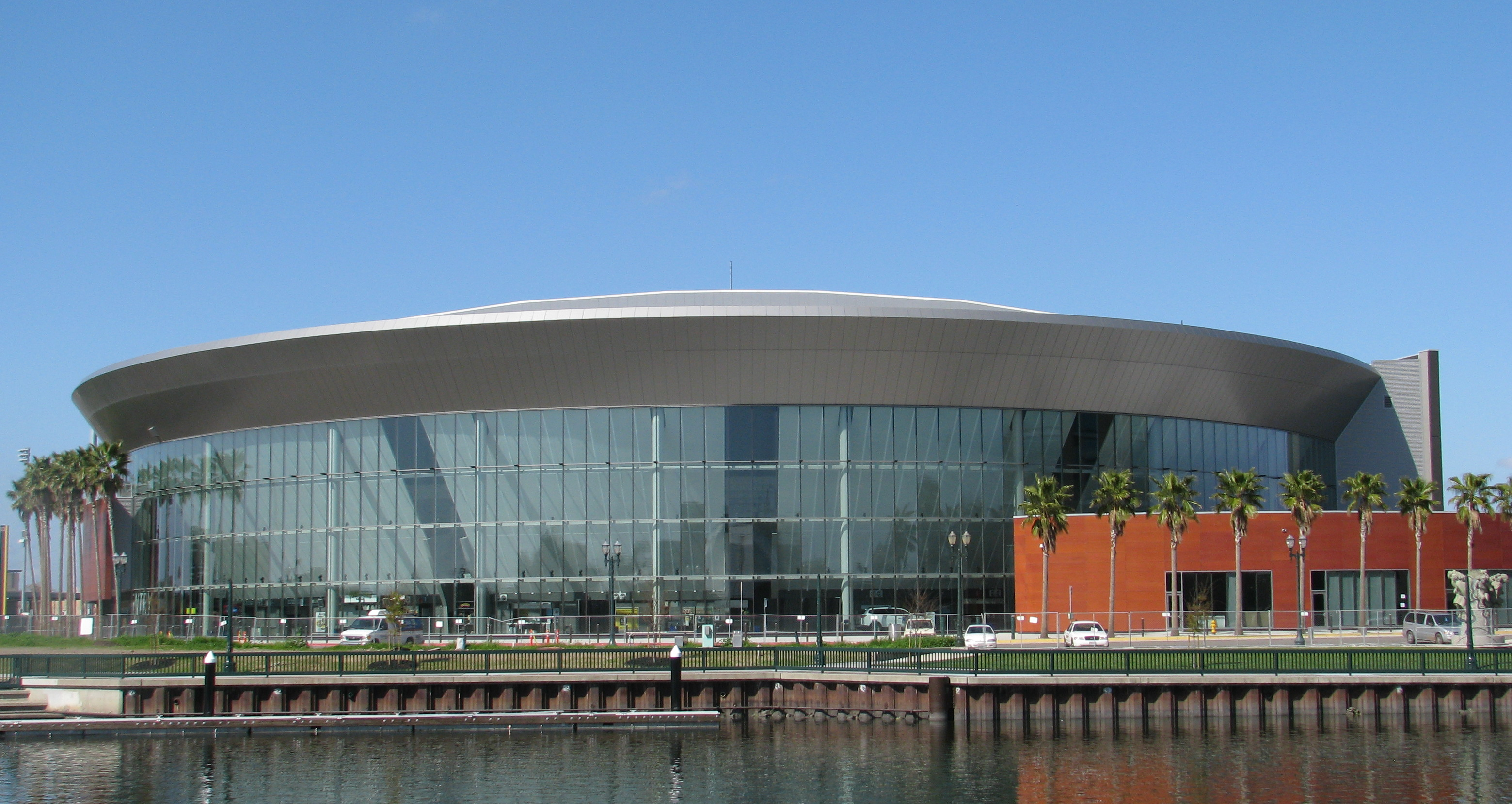
Stockton Arena on the Channel

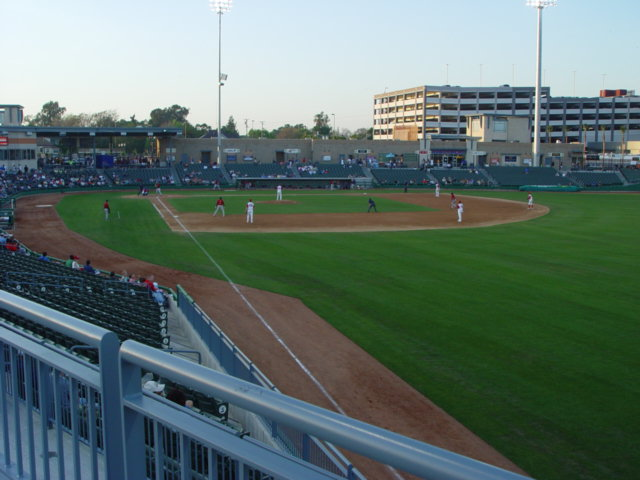
Banner Island Ballpark

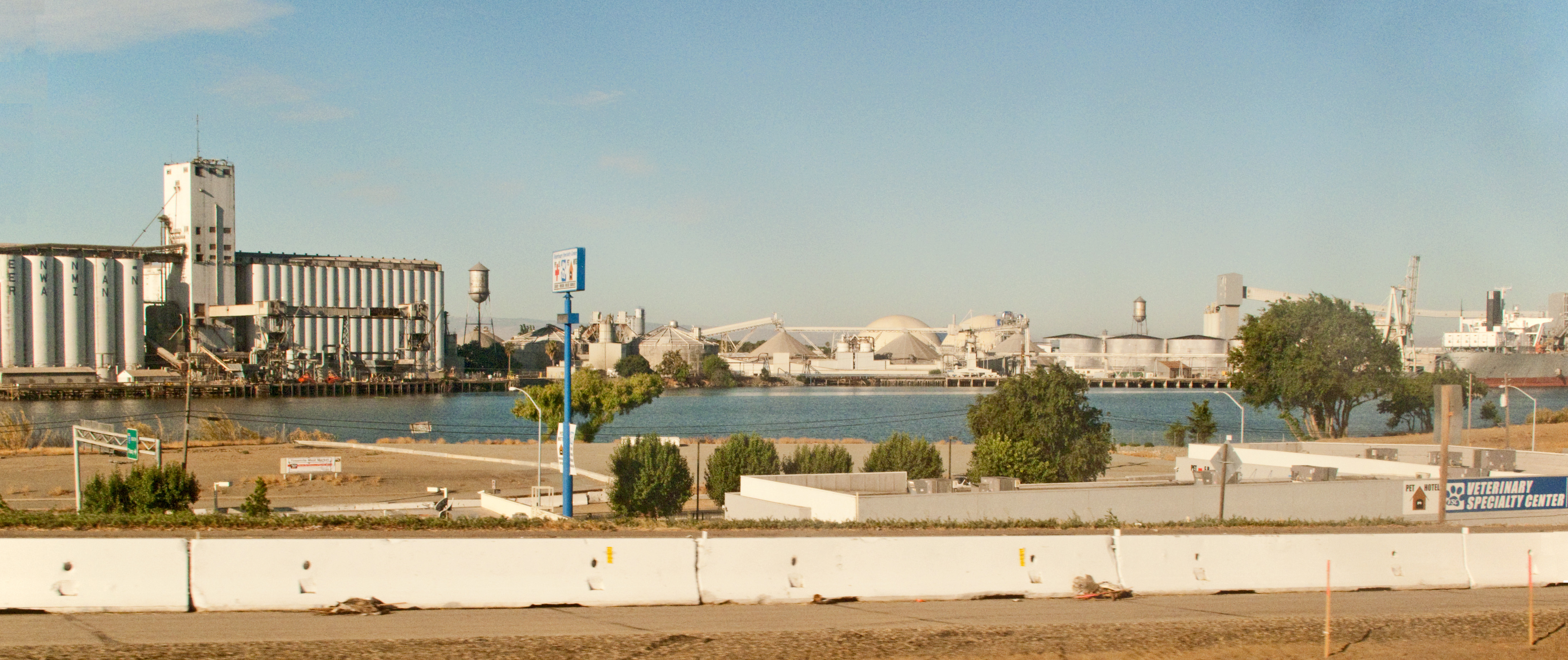
Port of Stockton on the Stockton Channel

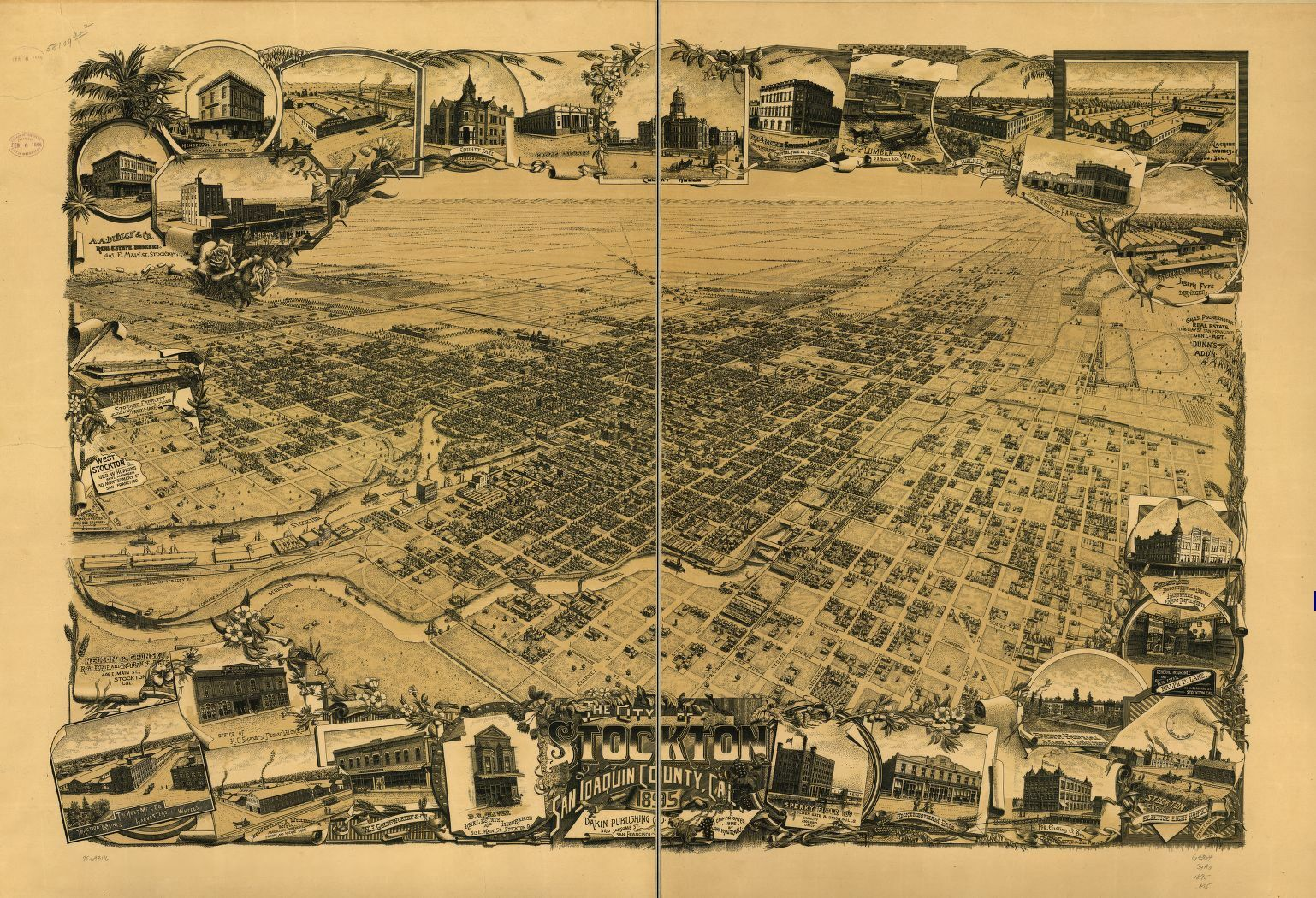
City of Stockton in 1895

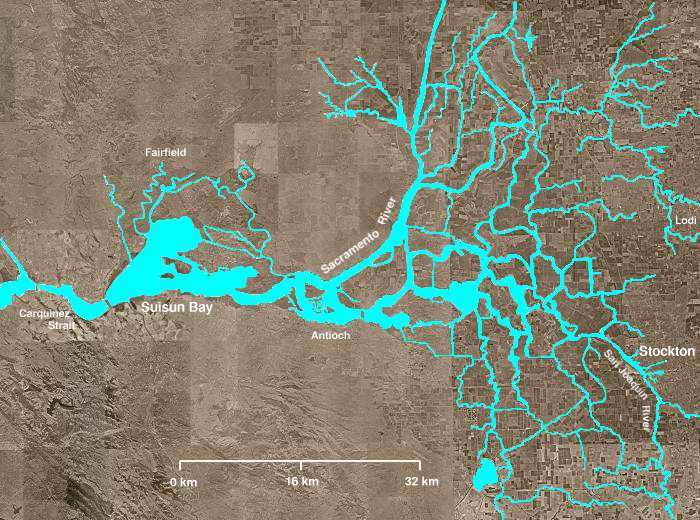
Sacramento–San Joaquin River Delta
