= California Chicory Works =

Historical place in San Joaquin County, United States

California Chicory Works Now The River Mill
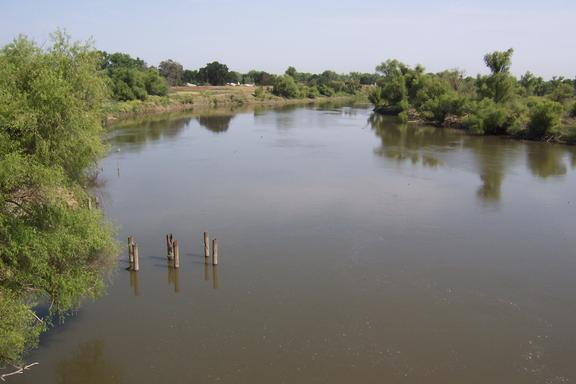
- San Joaquin River near California Chicory Works

- Location within California Location within the United States
- 37.863°N 121.318°W
- Location: 1672 W Bowman Road, French Camp, California

History
- Built: 1885

Site notes
- Architect(s): C. A. Bachmann and Charles H. W. Brandt

California Historical Landmark
- Designated: September 30, 1980
- Reference no.: 935

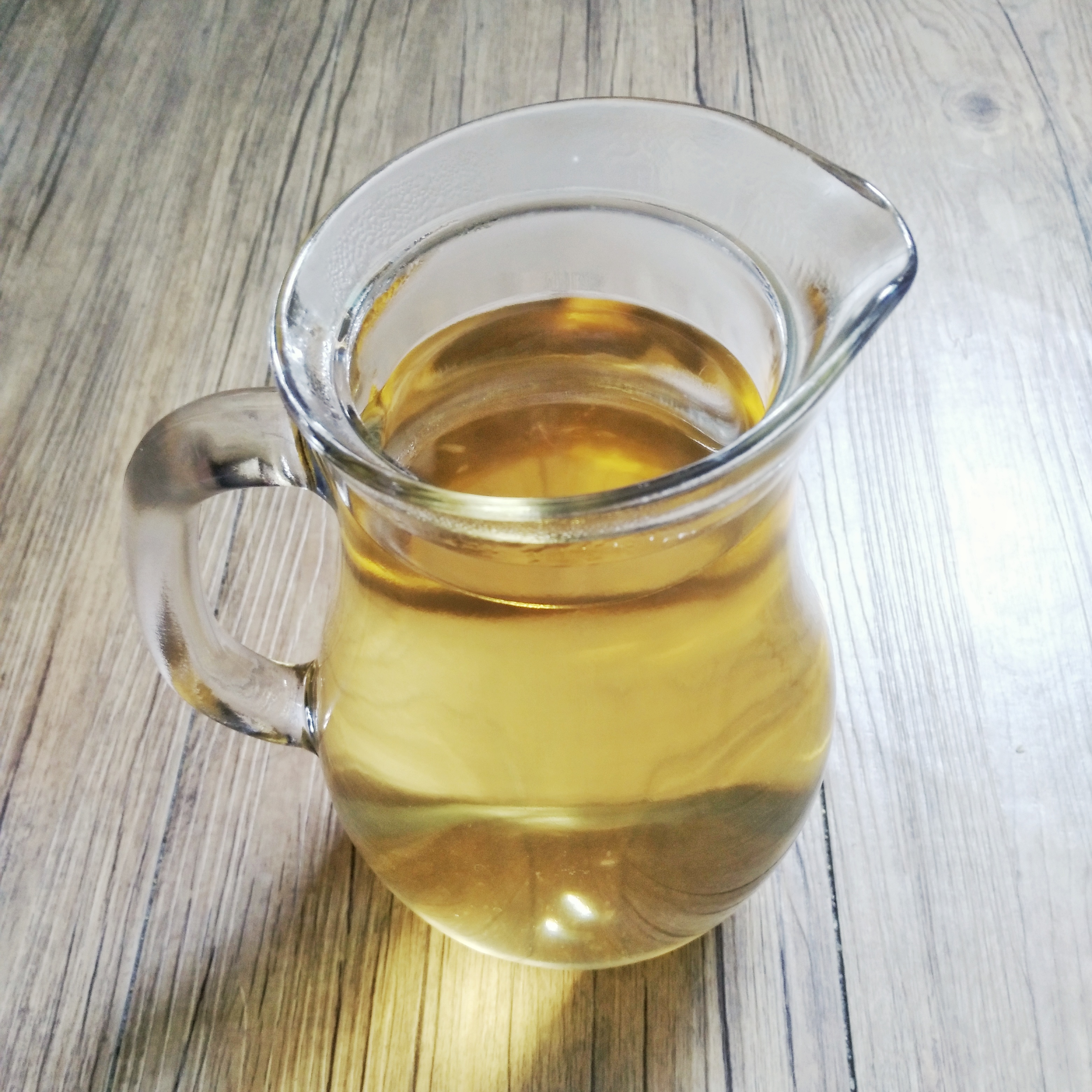
Chicory tea

The California Chicory Works site is a historical site in Stockton, California in San Joaquin County. The California Chicory Works site is a California Historical Landmark No. 935, listed on September 30, 1980. In 1885, C. A. Bachmann and Charles H. W. Brandt formed a partnership and built the largest chicory plant in America by the 1890s. At the California Chicory Works, chicory roots were roasted and grounded on the finest German machinery and mills. The chicory root was often mixed with coffee or used alone for a tea hot drink. At its peak California Chicory Works purchase a cargo ship the Dora to ship its product to the east coast and other ports. The mill was on and powered by the San Joaquin River. The market dropped in about 1911 and the plant closed shortly after.

The California Chicory Works was located on 1672 W Bowman Road in French Camp, California, The site is now the River Mill. A California Historical marker is there placed by the by State Department of Parks and Recreation and San Joaquin County Historical Society in 1981.

- The River Mill

The California Chicory Works building was sold to its current owner, The River Mill, in 1972. In the 1990s the building had extensive renovations. The River Mill is now rented as: a Convention center, social center, business meeting spot, special occasions site, wedding site and wedding reception site with 18,000 square feet of space.

== See also ==
- California Historical Landmarks in San Joaquin County
