= Benson's Ferry =

Historical Landmark and Park in San Joaquin County, United States

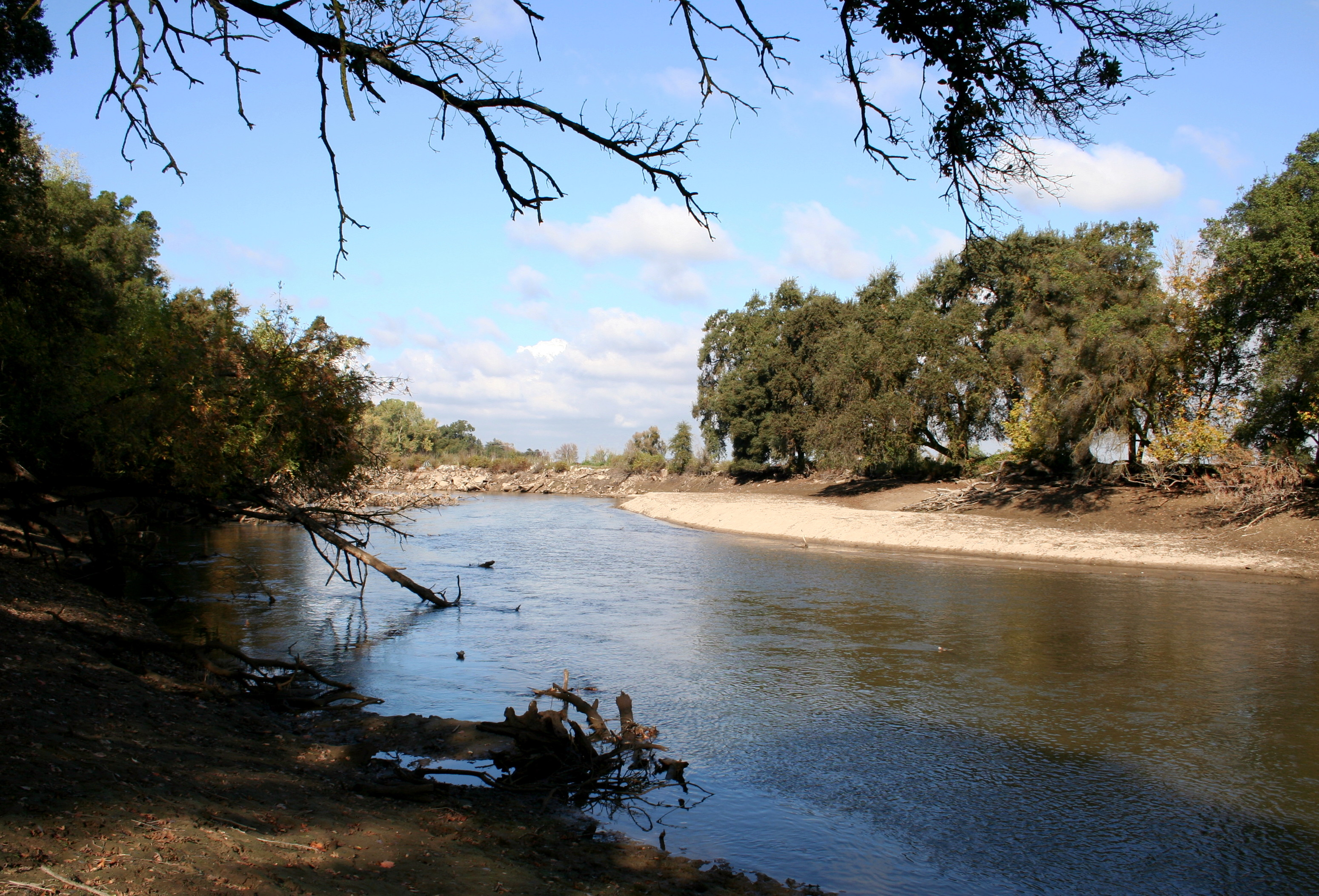
- Mokelumne River near Benson's Ferry site

- Location within California Location within the United States
- 38.2553°N 121.4406°W
- Location: Benson River Ferry Road, Galt, California

History
- Built: 1849

Site notes
- Architectural style: Cable ferry

California Historical Landmark
- Designated: January 11, 1935
- Reference no.: 149

Benson's Ferry site is a historical site in Thornton, California in San Joaquin County. The Benson's Ferry site is a California Historical Landmark No. 149, listed on January 11, 1935. The Benson River Ferry started operation in 1849 and was sold to John A. Benson in 1850. In 1852, John A. Benson planned and built a covered wagon trail from Sacramento to Stockton. John A. Benson was killed in 1859 and his son-in-law Ed Gayetty took over the operations of the River Ferry. Benson was born in 1821 in Missouri. The Benson River Ferry operated across the Mokelumne River near what is now San Joaquin County J8, 3 miles North of Thornton, California. There is a Benson River Ferry historical sign in Galt, California at Benson Ferry Road and Thorton Road.

== See also ==
- California Historical Landmarks in San Joaquin County
