= Stockton Waterfront Events Center =

Commercial complex in California

Coordinates: 37°57′21″N 121°17′45″W

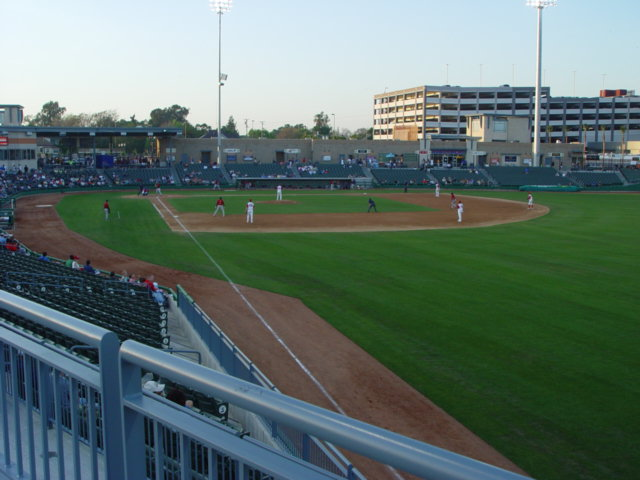
Banner Island Ballpark

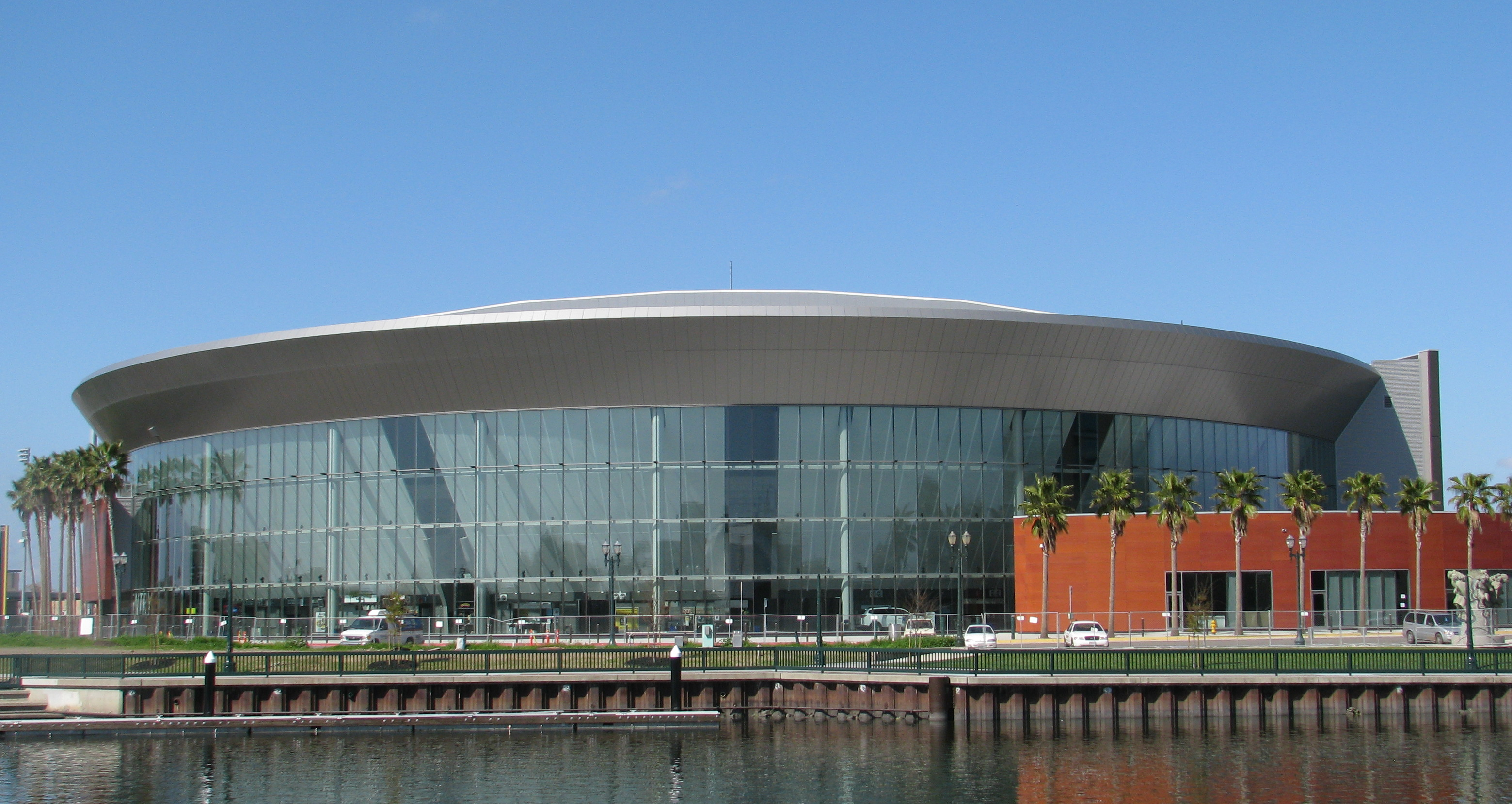
Stockton Arena on the Channel

The Stockton Waterfront Events Center is a commercial complex in Stockton, California on the Stockton waterfront. Also known as the Waterfront Entertainment Complex, it includes the 12,000-seat Stockton Arena, the 5,000-seat Banner Island Ballpark, a Sheraton Hotel and Conference Center, a 592-stall parking structure, and commercial/retail space. The Stockton Waterfront Events Center is part of a massive revitalization project that will include a marina, high-rise condominiums, and the Downtown Transit Center.
