= Battle of Stanislaus =

Historical Landmark and Park in San Joaquin County, United States

Battle of Stanislaus site
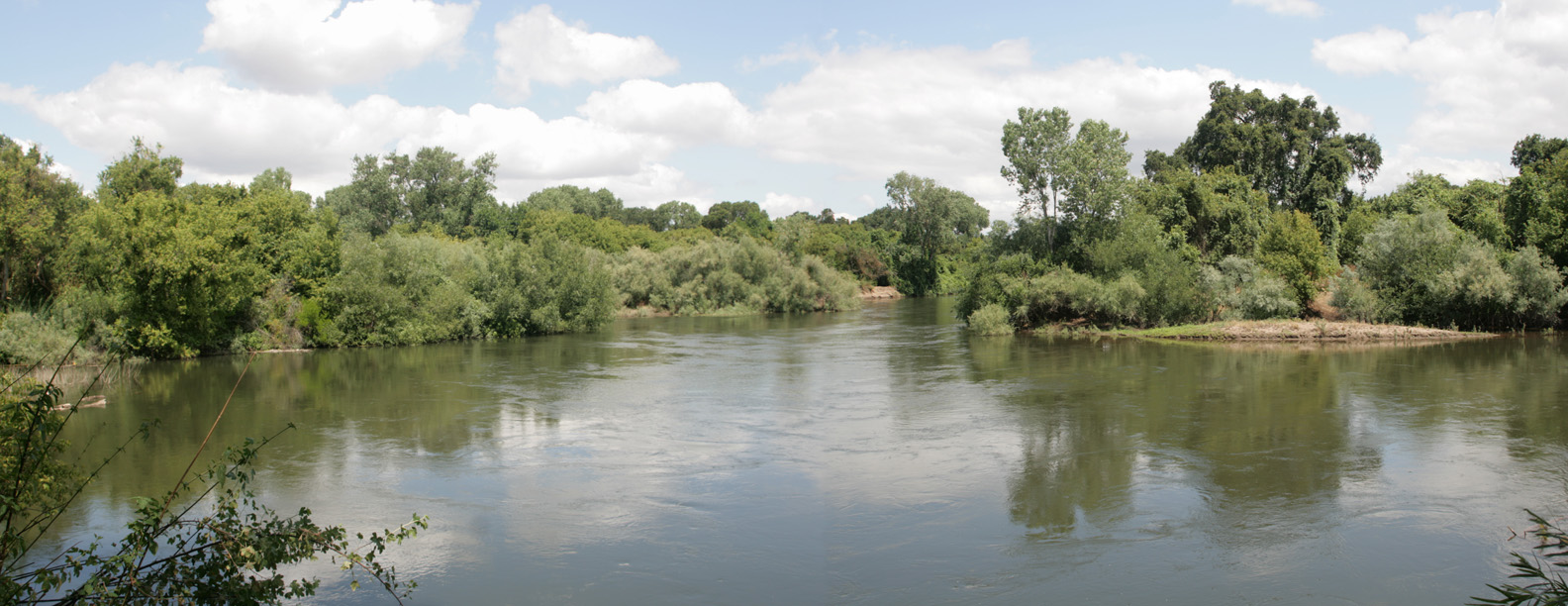
- Stanislaus River near Battle of Stanislaus site

- Location within California Location within the United States
- 37.665°N 121.237°W
- Location: South of 2 River road, Manteca, California

History
- Built: 1829

California Historical Landmark
- Designated: June 20, 1935
- Reference no.: 214

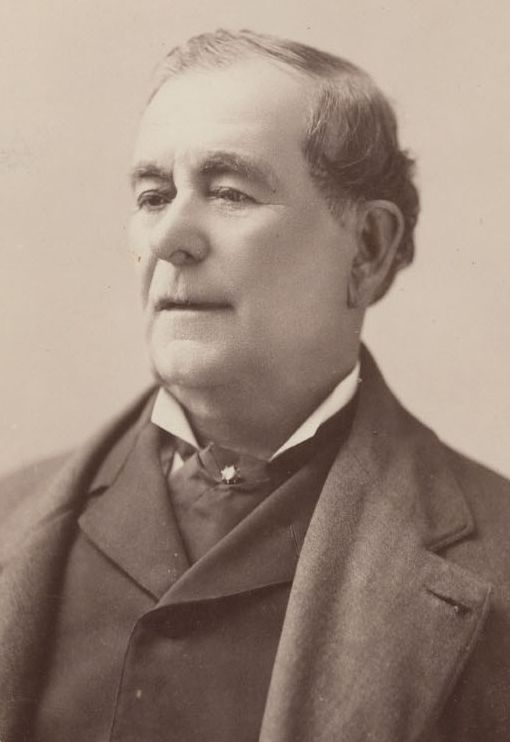
General Mariano Guadalupe Vallejo

Battle of Stanislaus site is a historical site in Manteca, California in San Joaquin County. The Battle of Stanislaus site is a California Historical Landmark No. 214 listed on June 20, 1935. The Battle of Stanislaus was fought in 1829 on the North bank of the Stanislaus River, near the meeting of the San Joaquin River and Stanislaus River. The Governor of California, José María de Echeandía, ordered Mariano Guadalupe Vallejo to attacked the Cosumnes tribe, a Miwok, Yokuts and Nisenan people group. Cosumnes has earlier raided local ranches in the area. The fight was one of a number of battles fought at the time in the San Joaquin Valley. The war between the tribes and First Mexican Republic in Alta California did not end due to a war end, but by a mosquito-borne disease, malaria. Malaria can into the San Joaquin Valley in 1833 by Canadian beaver trappers with the Hudson's Bay Company. Over 20,000 California natives died from malaria in 1833. The Battle of Stanislaus was the last of the California Northern tribal wars. The war The Mexican army used cannons to fight the last of these wars.

The Stanislaus County and Stanislaus River (Rio de Estanislao) are named after a native educated at Mission San José named Estanislao, after the Saint Stanislaus the Martyr. Estanislao revolted against the Mexican Army. Estanislao was the leader of the band that fought some battles against the Mexican Army. In 1826 he lost fighting Mariano Guadalupe Vallejo.

No marker is at the site of the Battle of Stanislaus. A marker to José María de Echeandía is at Caswell Memorial State Park In Ripon, California.

== See also ==
- California Historical Landmarks in San Joaquin County
