= Juan Flaco =

Historical person, event and place in San Joaquin County, United States

Juan "Flaco" Brown Grave site
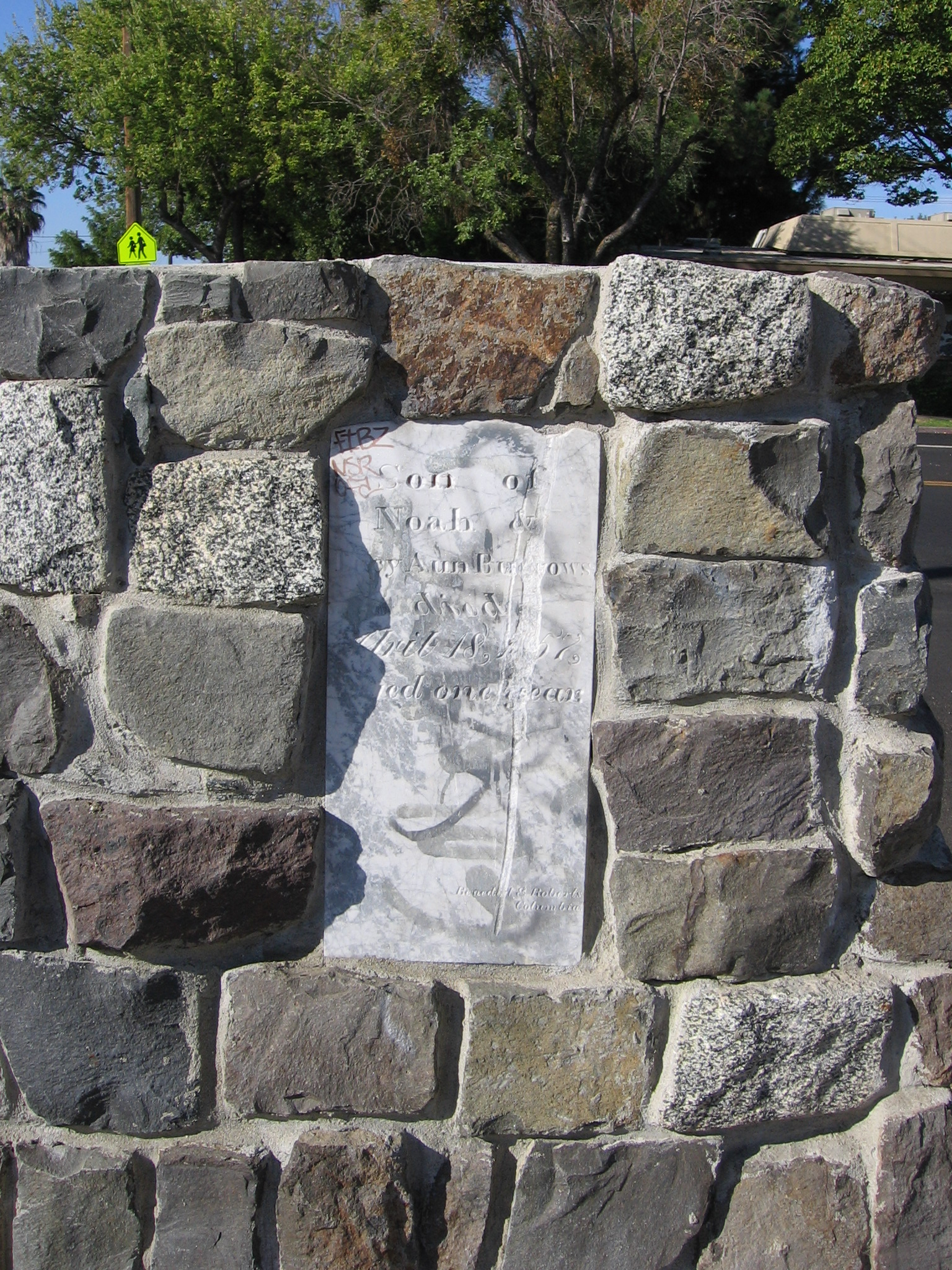
- Juan "Flaco" Brown Grave

- Location within California Location within the United States
- 37.955°N 121.2769°W
- Location: 1100 E Weber Street, Stockton, California

California Historical Landmark
- Designated: November 25, 1953
- Reference no.: 513

Juan Brown (1799–1859), nickname Juan Flaco, also known as both John Brown and the Paul Revere of California, rode from Los Angeles to San Francisco California in four days in 1846, during the Mexican–American War. Juan "Flaco" Brown was sent by Captain Archibald H. Gillespie at Fort Hill due to the Siege of Los Angeles which started on September 22, 1846. United States Army Troops were trapped in Pueblo de Los Ángeles, Alta California by José María Flores' men. Juan "Flaco" Brown took word to Commodore Robert F. Stockton in San Francisco about the serious trouble that Gillespie's troops in Los Angeles were facing.

== History ==
Flaco departed Los Angeles at 8 PM on September 24 with a note from Gillespie to Stockton, bearing Gillespie's seal, hidden in his hair. He departed by pretending to be a deserter. Tom Lewis joined Flaco and they stopped in Mission Santa Barbara late at night where they rented fresh horses and bought food from Lieutenant Talbolt. The next day at Mission San Luis Rey, Tom Lewis departed and Flaco rode on to Monterey where he was given a fresh horse. At San Jose, he got a fresh horse and shortly talked with Thomas O. Larkin, the first and only American consul ever stationed on American soil. Flaco arrived at San Francisco in the evening at 8 PM on September 28, after a six hundred miles ride with only 3 hours of rest in Monterey, through land filled with unfriendly natives and Mexican Californios. Commodore Stockton ordered Captain William Mervine to sail to Los Angeles with 350 men to help the Troops under siege there. Mervine arrived too late. After one week of siege, Gillespie Troops were out of food and gunpowder and surrendered. As part of the surrender Gillespie's Troops marched to the Port of San Pedro and departed Los Angeles on September 30, 1846, on the American merchant ship Vandalia.

On January 8, 1847, Los Angeles was taken in the last battle of the Mexican–American War, Battle of La Mesa. General Stephen W. Kearny (1794–1848) and his troops came to Los Angeles marching in from Santa Fe, New Mexico by way of San Diego and the Battle of San Pasqual. Stockton and his men sailed in from San Francisco by way of San Diego. Kearny and Stockton's 607 Troops found Flores' 300 men near the San Gabriel River about 6 miles south of Pueblo de Los Ángeles. Flores lost the last battle of the Mexican–American War. There were few casualties and Flores retreated to Monterey and later to Mexico. On January 10 Kearny and Stockton's Troops Marched into the Los Angeles Plaza and Captain Gillespie raised the Flag of the United States.

The United States acquired Alta California and Los Angeles through the Mexican–American War and the Treaty of Guadalupe Hidalgo. The State of California was admitted to the Union on September 9, 1850.

== Legacy ==
- He was born Johannes Braun in Karlskrona Sweden in 1799. He departed home and became a sailor at age 18. In South America be was captured and was a prisoner, but escaped and came to California in 1828, making he one of the first (or the first) Swedes to arrive in California. He enlisted in the American Army in 1846. After the war he worked as a cowboy on a ranch. Juan "Flaco" Brown, "Lean John", lived in the City of Stockton from 1851 to 1859. He died in Stockton on December 10, 1859.
- Juan "Flaco" Brown Grave Site is a historical site in Stockton, California in San Joaquin County. Juan "Flaco" Brown Grave Site is a California Historical Landmark No. 513, listed on November 25, 1953. The California Historical Landmark is at the intersection of East Weber Street and North Union Street built by The State Department of Parks and Recreation in working with local civic and historical organizations. Juan Flaco is buried in the former Stockton Citizen's Cemetery at 100 E Weber Ave (a pioneer graveyard at Weber Avenue and Pilgrim Street, now under the city).
- During World War II a Liberty ship was named after Juan Flaco Brown, the SS Juan Flaco Brown.
- In the 1957 California's Paul Revere episode of Death Valley Days, Alex Sharp played Juan Flaco.

== Gallery ==
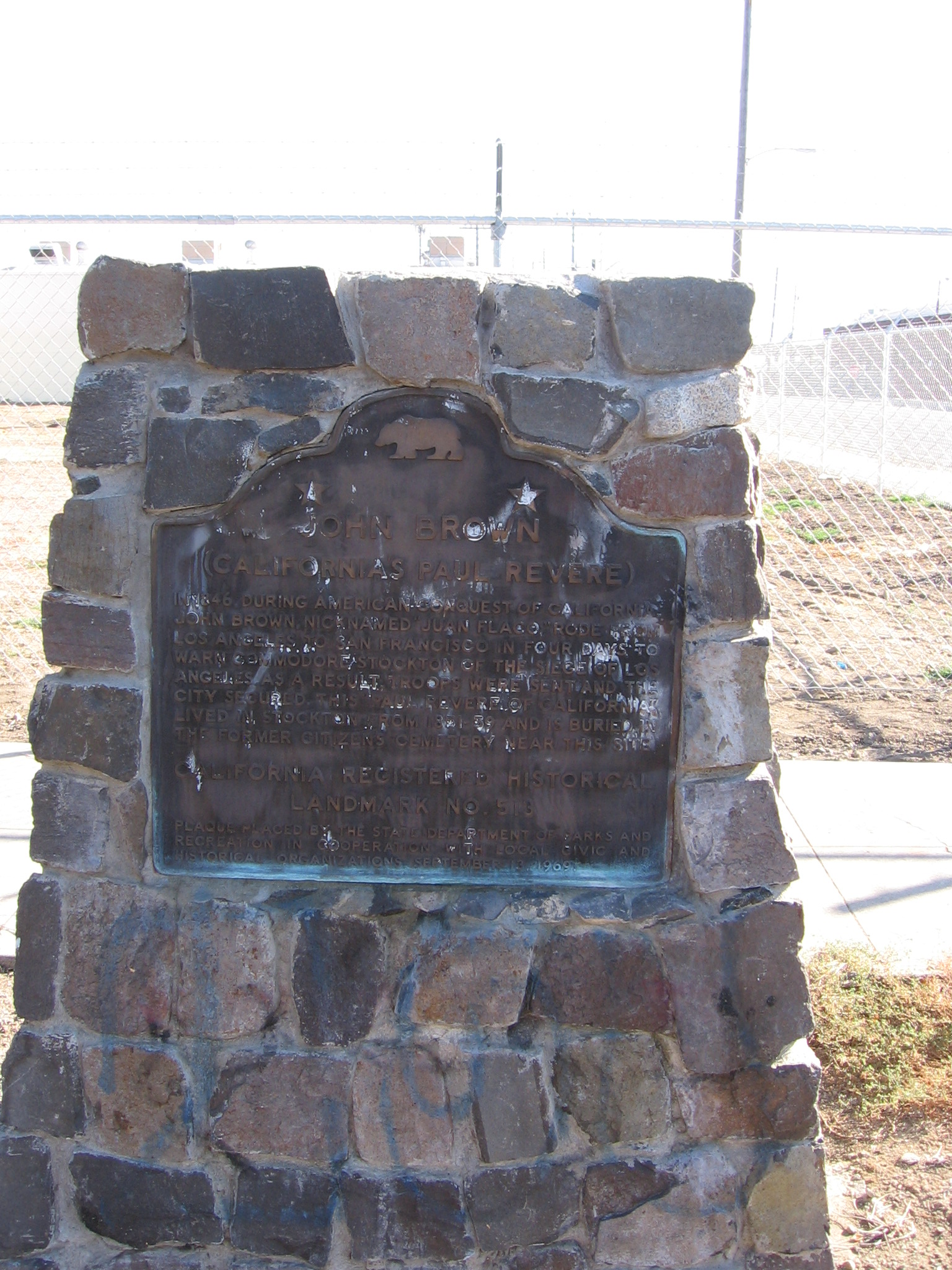
California Historical Landmark No. 513 in Stockton

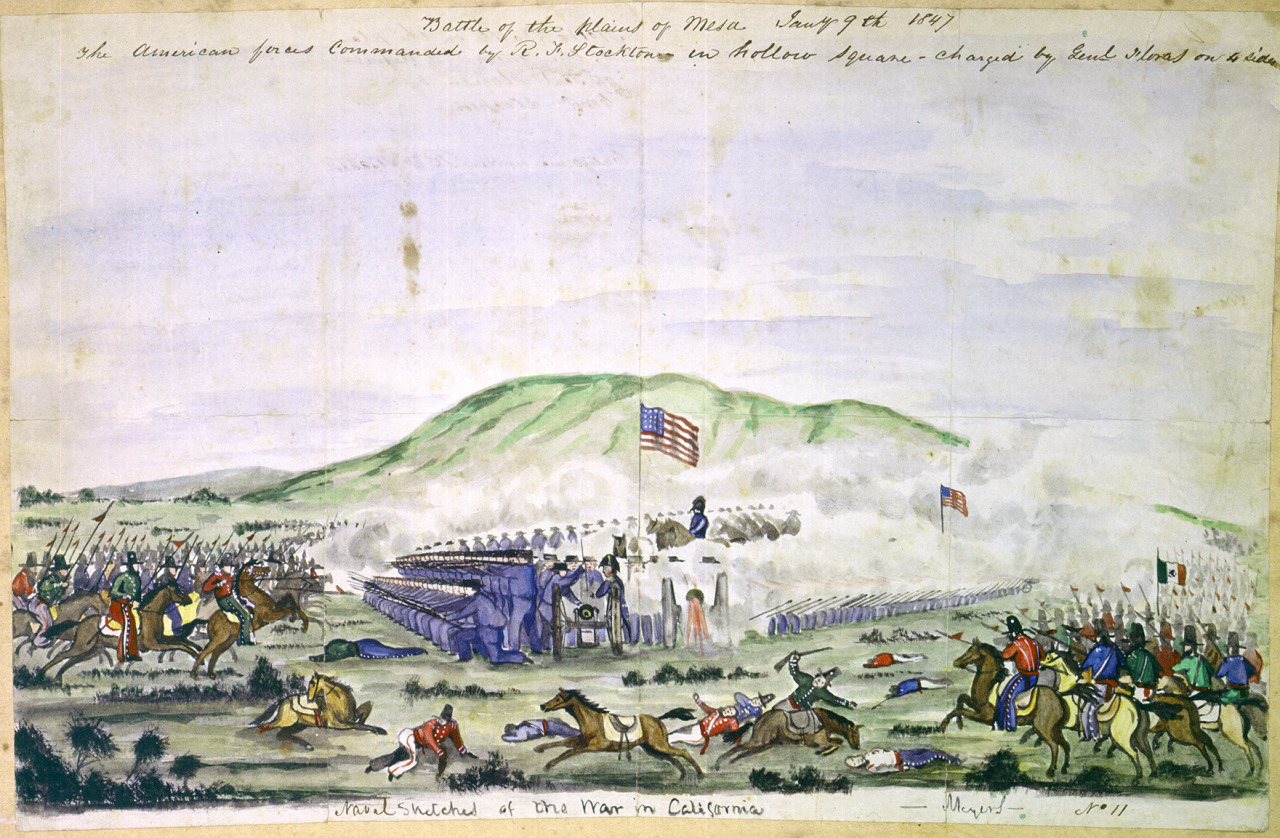
Battle of La Mesa by William H. Meyers, in 1847

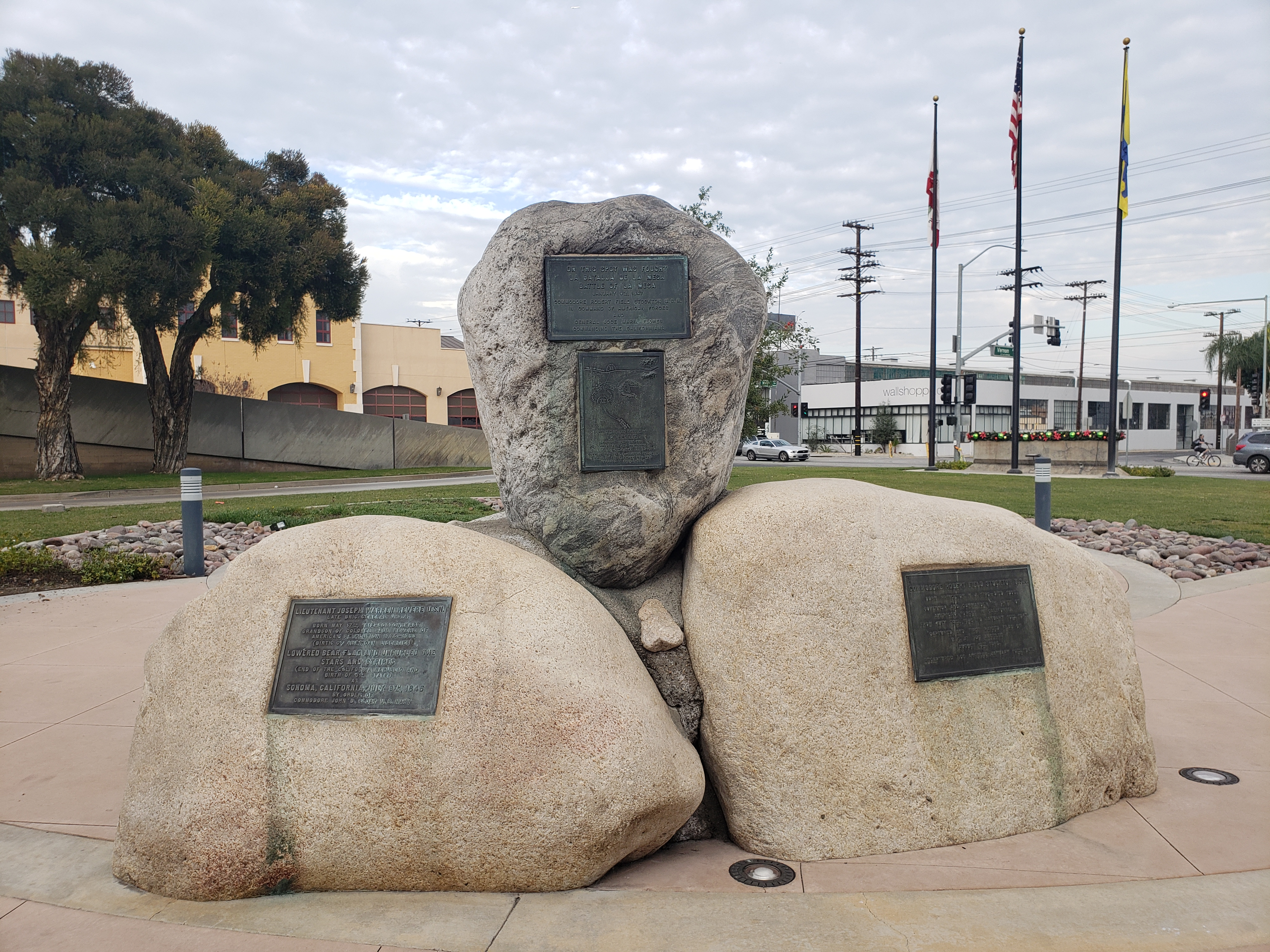
Monument for the Battle of La Mesa, northeast of the entrance to the City of La Mesa city hall.

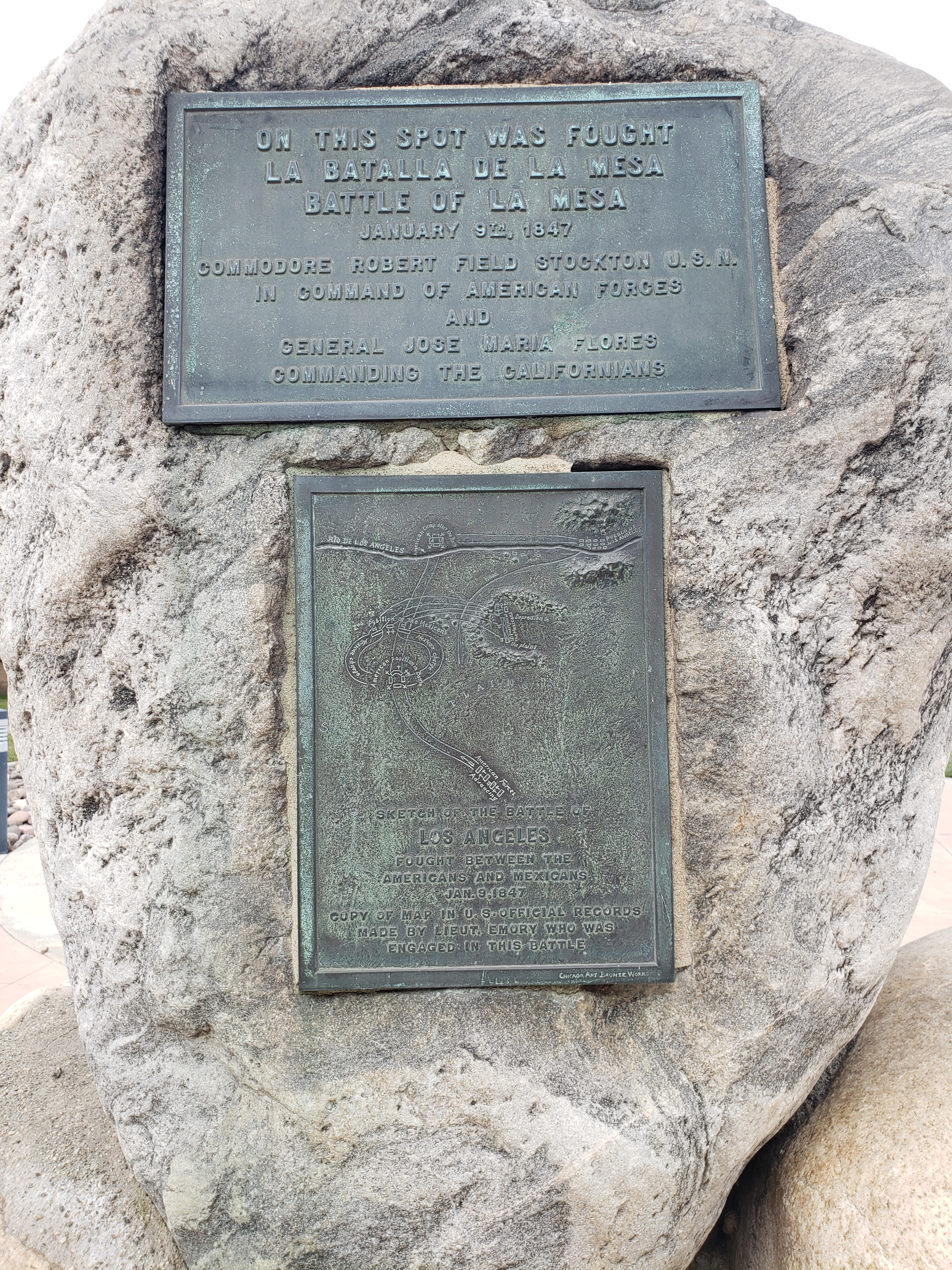
Monument for the Battle Map

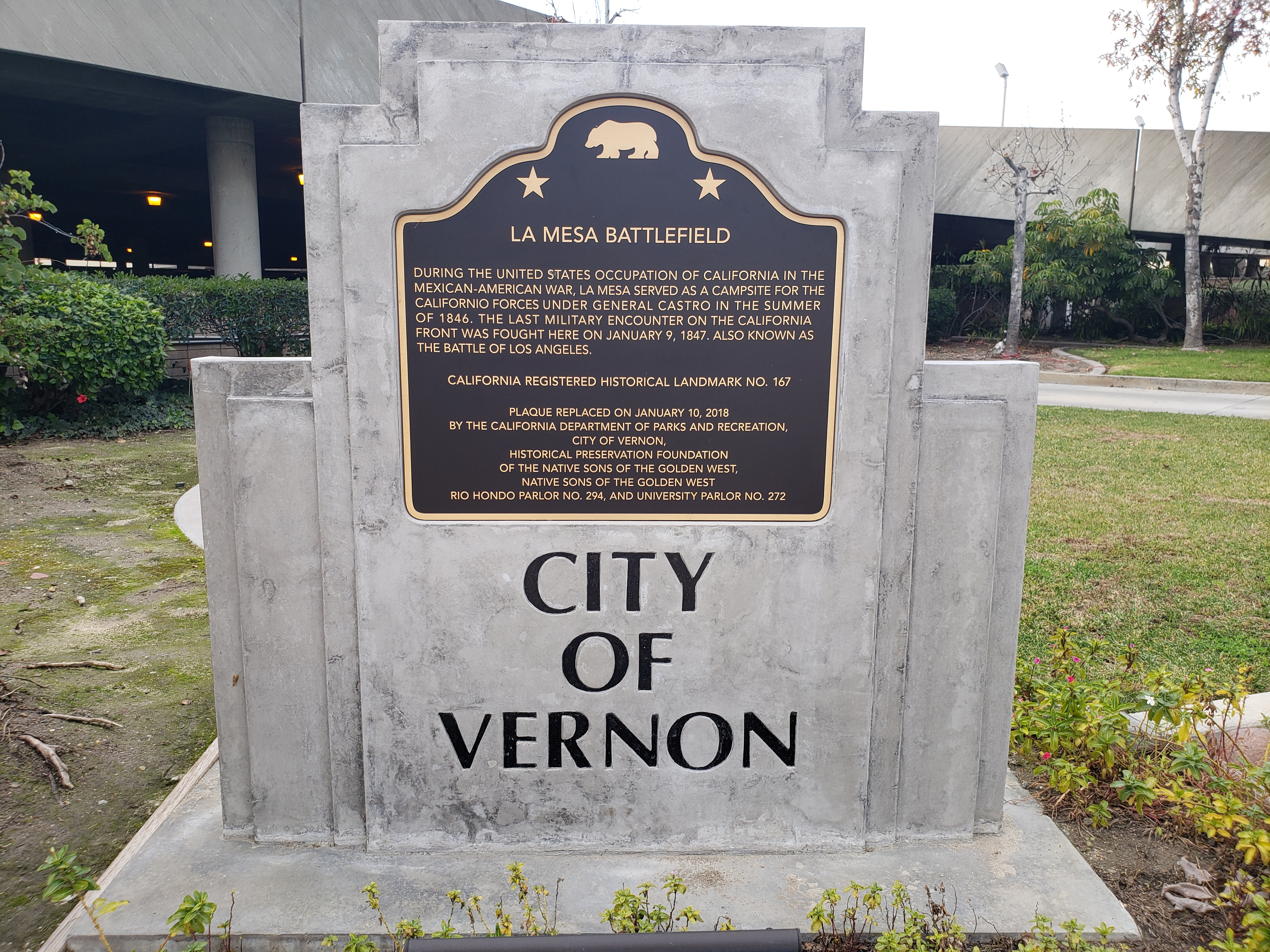
California Historical marker outside Vernon City Hall

== See also ==
- California Historical Landmarks in San Joaquin County
