= Lodi Arch =

- U.S. National Register of Historic Places
- California Historical Landmark
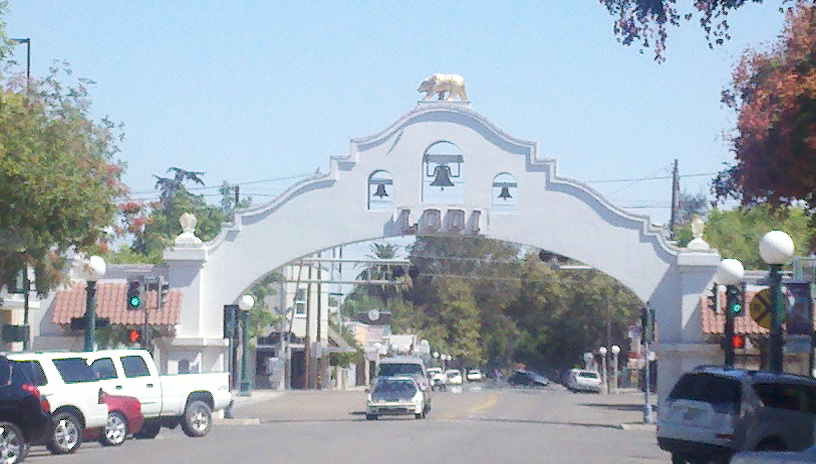

- Location within California Location within the United States
- Location: Pine St., Lodi, California
- Coordinates: 38°8′3″N 121°16′15″W
- Area: 0.1 acres (0.040 ha)
- Built: 1907
- Architect: Brown, E.B.
- Architectural style: Mission/Spanish Revival
- NRHP reference No.: 80000848
- CHISL No.: 931

Significant dates
- Added to NRHP: September 17, 1980
- Designated CHISL: May 13, 1980

The Lodi Arch, also known as Mission Arch, in Lodi, California, is one of the few remaining Mission Revival ceremonial structures within the state of California. It was built in 1907 by architect E. B. Brown for the first Lodi Tokay Carnival, which still occurs annually as the Lodi Grape Festival. The following year, a California Golden Bear and a sign reading "Lodi" were added to the arch. The arch was restored in 1956 after its deteriorating condition made it a safety hazard; the golden bear was turned to the North in 1956 and has also been restored twice, in the 1940s and in 2001. In addition to its architectural significance, the arch serves as a symbol of Lodi and a focal point for the city's downtown.

It was listed as both a California Historical Landmark and on the National Register of Historic Places in 1980.
