= Rancho Campo de los Franceses =

Mexican land grant in California

Coordinates: 38.020°N 121.230°W

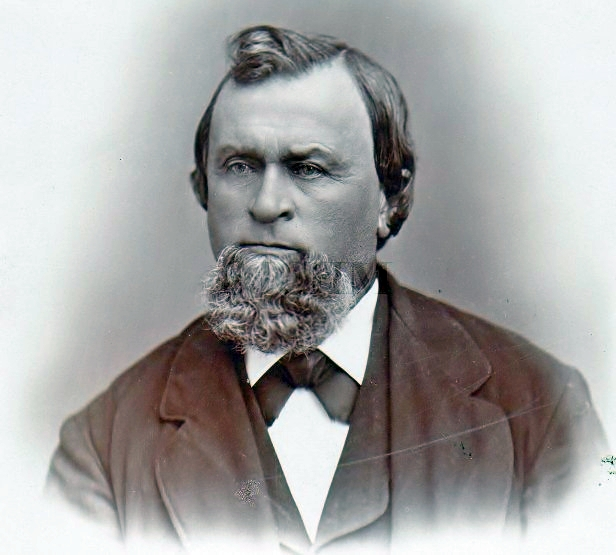
Carl David Maria Weber founded Stockton when he acquired and settled Rancho Campo de los Franceses

Rancho Campo de los Franceses was a 48,747-acre (197.27 km^{2}) Mexican land grant in present-day San Joaquin County, California, given in 1844 by Governor Manuel Micheltorena to Guillermo Gulnac. "Campo de los Franceses” which in English means “French Camp” refers to French-Canadian fur trappers who wintered there. The grant included present-day French Camp and Stockton.

== History ==
Carl David Maria Weber (1814–1881) (né Karl David Weber, also Carlos Maria Weber and Charles Maria Weber) was born in Steinwenden (Palatinate, Kingdom of Bavaria), immigrated to America in 1836. After spending time in Texas, he came overland from Missouri to California with the Bartleson-Bidwell Party in 1841. Shortly after his arrival, he began calling himself Charles. Weber went to work for John Sutter, who vouched for "Carlos Maria Weber" to the Mexican authorities. In 1842, Weber settled in the Pueblo of San José and became a business partner of Guillermo (William) Gulnac. William Gulnac (1801-1851), born in Hudson, New York, was a blacksmith and fur trapper who came to the Pueblo of San José in 1833. He married Maria Ceseña, sister of Liberata Ceseña, the patentee of Rancho Laguna Seca, and became a naturalized Mexican citizen. He was elected regidor in 1839. Weber and Gulnac operated several businesses. They set up a corn-mill, ran a bakery and a smithy, mined for salt, made shoes and soap, and kept cattle and horses.

Gulnac, a Mexican citizen, petitioned Governor Micheltorena for a tract of land eleven leagues in extent, for the benefit of himself and eleven other families who were to assist him in forming a settlement. The governor ordered that the petitioner to say whether the grant was asked for a colony, and that if so the names of the families should be stated in the title; but if he desired it for himself individually, that he should ask for it within reasonable limits. The grant states that is for the benefit of Gulnac and his family and that of eleven other families; but their names are not mentioned. It may be presumed that the Governor finally determined to grant the land to Gulnac alone, leaving him to make such arrangements with the families who were to settle upon the land as he might see fit.

Gulnac and Weber dissolved their partnership in 1843. Gulnac's attempts to settle the Rancho Campo de los Franceses failed, and he sold the land to Weber in 1845. In 1846, Weber induced a number of settlers to locate on the rancho, when the Mexican–American War broke out. Weber was first considered a Californio and then an American. He was offered a captaincy by Mexican General José Castro, which he declined. He later became a captain in the cavalry of the United States. Captain Weber's decision to change sides lost him a great deal of the trust he had built up among his Mexican business partners. As a result, he sold his business in 1849.

Weber moved to the grant in 1847, and laid out a town, which he named Tuleburg in 1849. Soon afterward he renamed it Stockton, in honour of Commodore Robert F. Stockton. As the head of navigation on the San Joaquin River, the city grew rapidly as a miners’ supply point during the California Gold Rush. Weber himself set off for the gold fields, and worked there as a gold prospector and a merchant.

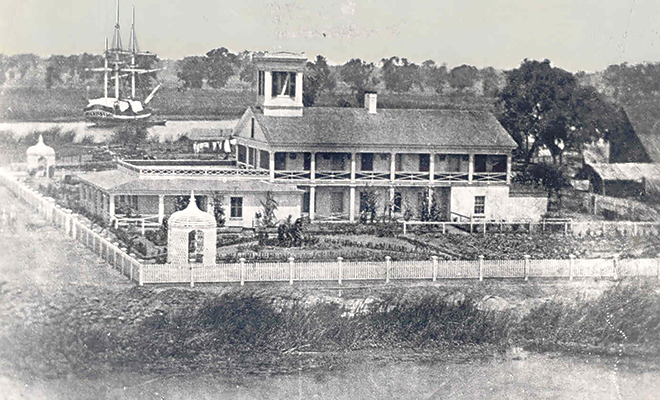
Weber Point Home

Returning from the gold mines in 1850, Weber married Helen Murphy (1822–1895), daughter of Martin Murphy Sr., owner of Rancho Ojo del Agua de la Coche. Helen and Carlos moved to what is still Weber Point Home in Stockton and had three children: Charles Martin Weber II (1851–1912), Julia Helen Weber (1853–1935) and Thomas Jefferson Weber (1855–1892). Capt. Weber's brother, Adolf Weber (1825-1906), came from Germany to California in 1853 in search of his brother and settled in San Francisco, where he worked as a chemist at the California State Mint and ultimately founded Humboldt Savings and Loan (1869).

With the cession of California to the United States following the Mexican-American War, the 1848 Treaty of Guadalupe Hidalgo provided that land grants would be honored. As required by the Land Act of 1851, Weber filed a claim with the Public Land Commission in 1852 and the grant was confirmed by the Commission in 1855 and the US District Court in 1857. His opponents appealed the decision to the US Supreme Court, but the grant was patented to Carlos Weber in 1861.

A claim was filed by Agustin Jouan, an agent of Joseph Yves Limantour, and 12 families with the Land Commission in 1853, but was rejected by the Commission in 1855. A claim was filed by Justo Larios et al. with the Land Commission in 1853 and rejected by the Commission in 1855.

== Historic sites ==
- First building in present City of Stockton. In August 1844, Thomas Lindsay, one of the first settlers at Rancho del Campo de los Franceses, built the first dwelling on this site.
- French Camp. The terminus of the Oregon-California trail used by French-Canadian trappers employed by the Hudson's Bay Company from about 1832 to 1845. Michel Laframboise, among others, met fur hunters here annually, where they camped with their families.
- Weber Point Home. Site of a two-story adobe-and-redwood house built in 1850 by Charles M. Weber, founder and pioneer developer of Stockton. it remained Captain Weber's home until his death in 1881.
