= New Hope Agricultural Project =

Historical place in San Joaquin County, United States

New Hope Agricultural Colony
- Location within California Location within the United States
- 37.739°N 121.128°W
- Location: Ripon 430 West Main Street, Ripon, California

History
- Built: 1846

California Historical Landmark
- Designated: June 2. 1942
- Reference no.: 436

New Hope Agricultural Colony is a historical site in Ripon, California in San Joaquin County. New Hope Agricultural Colony site is a California Historical Landmark No. 436, listed on June 2. 1942. In 1846, the first wheat in the San Joaquin Valley was planted about six miles west of Ripon by 20 Mormon pioneers that arrived from Brooklyn by ship. The crop was irrigated by the pole and bucket lifting method. The pioneers built three log homes, a sawmill and cable ferry across Stanislaus River, that became later Stanislaus City. On June 27, 1844, Mormons leader Joseph Smith was killed, followers of Joseph Smith moved west, most came west by wagon trains. The group at Ripon came by ship to San Francisco.

A historical marker in Ripon was built by California Centennials Commission working with Alameda County Camps and the Daughters Utah Pioneers on October 22, 1949

== See also ==
- California Historical Landmarks in San Joaquin County
