= Weber Institute =

Captain Charles M. Weber Institute of Applied Science and Technology

Location
- 302 W. Weber Avenue; Stockton, California 95203; United States; 37°57′08″N 121°17′41″W

Information
- Type: Public Secondary
- School district: Stockton Unified School District
- Principal: Osman Zarif
- Teaching staff: 15.84 (FTE) (2018–19)
- Grades: 9–12
- Gender: Co-educational
- Enrollment: 427 (2018–19)
- Student to teacher ratio: 26.96∶1 (2018–19)
- Campus: Suburban
- Nickname: Dragons
- Website: www.stocktonusd.net/Weber

Captain Charles M. Weber of Applied Science and Technology, often simply abbreviated as Weber Institute, is a public school serving grades 9–12. It is in the Stockton Unified School District. It has an enrollment of 500 (approximately).

== History ==
Weber Institute was established as a specialized school focusing on technology, health, and automobile maintenance fields. Prospective freshmen are required to complete an application form and submit an essay detailing their reasons for wanting to enroll at Weber. The school derives its name from Captain Charles M. Weber, the founding figure of Stockton city.

== Academics ==
Weber Institute is divided into three academies technology, which consist of classes like webpage design, drafting, digital arts, digital graphics, photography, multimedia, 3-D modeling, and more recently video game design. Health has courses like foundations of health, and medical assisting. Automobile deals with cars, repairing them or modifying them. In addition to these academies, Weber also has a freshman academy in which freshman take general courses before choosing any of the previous academy.

== Extracurriculars ==
=== Clubs ===
Weber Institute has many clubs and activities such as Key Club, in which student do community services to the local area within the city. SkillsUSA, which helps students compete against each other which helps gained knowledge for the work force and has been successful with students.
