= Temple Israel Cemetery (Stockton, California) =

Historical site in San Joaquin County, California

- Location within California Location within the United States
- 37.964°N 121.278°W
- Location: 1110 E. Acacia Street, Stockton, California

History
- Built: 1851

California Historical Landmark
- Designated: August 10, 1961
- Reference no.: 765

Temple Israel Cemetery is a historical site in Stockton, California in San Joaquin County. Stockton Developmental Center is a California Historical Landmark No. 765, listed on August 10, 1961. The land for Temple Israel Cemetery was donated by Captain Charles M. Weber in 1851. The local Jewish community of Stockton Temple Israel of Stockton built a cemetery on the land. Temple Israel Cemetery is the oldest Jewish cemetery in continuous use in California, also west of the Rocky Mountains.

In 1851, the Stockton Jewish community founded, Ryhim Ahoovim, a Jewish Bevevolent Society. Ryhim Ahoovim held a High Holy Days service at the Corinthian Theater in Stockton in 1851. The Ryhim Ahoovim, a Jewish Bevevolent Society became a Jewish congregation in 1855 and a synagogue building was built and dedicated in 1855 with 43 members. The building was move in 1863 to Hunter Street, due to the Great Flood of 1862 and used till 1905.

A historical marker was built by The State Department of Parks and Recreation working with Temple Israel and the Union of American Hebrew Congregations on December 10, 1961. This marker is in storage, but a replacement marker is at the Temple Israel Cemetery site. The Temple Israel Cemetery marker is located at 1110 E. Acacia Street, Stockton.

== See also ==
- California Historical Landmarks in San Joaquin County
