= French Camp, California =

French Camp
- Unincorporated community and census-designated place
- Location in San Joaquin County and the state of California

- Location in the United States
- Coordinates: 37°52′58″N 121°16′47″W
- Country: United States
- State: California
- County: San Joaquin

Government
  - Assemblymember: Rhodesia Ransom (D)
  - State Senator: Jerry McNerney (D)
  - U. S. Congress: Josh Harder (D)

Area
  - Total: 3.094 sq mi (8.014 km^{2})
  - Land: 3.094 sq mi (8.014 km^{2})
  - Water: 0 sq mi (0.000 km^{2}) 0%
- Elevation: 20 ft (6 m)

Population (2020)
  - Total: 3,770
  - Density: 1,220/sq mi (470/km^{2})
- Time zone: UTC−8 (PST)
  - Summer (DST): UTC−7 (PDT)
- ZIP code: 95231
- Area code: 209
- FIPS code: 06-26028
- GNIS feature ID: 1658581

California Historical Landmark
- Reference no.: 668

French Camp (from Campo de los Franceses, Spanish for "Field of the Frenchmen") is an unincorporated community in San Joaquin County, California, United States. The population was 3,770 as of the 2020 census. Up from 3,376 at the 2010 census, and down from 4,109 at the 2000 census. For statistical purposes, the United States Census Bureau has defined French Camp as a census-designated place (CDP). The census definition of the area may not precisely correspond to local understanding of the area with the same name.

French Camp is the location of the U.S. Army Sharpe Depot and the GSA Western Distribution Center, and is the oldest settlement in San Joaquin County. San Joaquin General Hospital is located in French Camp. It is also the location of the county jail, the county juvenile hall and the county children's shelter, which combine to form a sizable percentage of the place's population.

== Geography ==
French Camp is located at 37°52′58″N 121°16′47″W (37.882742, -121.279788).

According to the United States Census Bureau, the CDP has a total area of 3.1 square miles (8.0 square kilometers), all land.

=== Climate ===
According to the Köppen Climate Classification system, French Camp has a warm-summer Mediterranean climate, abbreviated "Csa" on climate maps.

== History ==
French Camp was the southernmost regular camp site of the Hudson's Bay Company southern fur brigades sent from Fort Vancouver (now Vancouver, Washington), established by Michel Laframboise in 1832. Its Spanish name was preserved in a land grant dated January 13, 1844 as Rancho Campo de los Franceses. It is commemorated as California State Historic Landmark 668:

Here was the terminus of the Oregon-California trail used by the French-Canadian trappers employed by the Hudson's Bay Company from about 1832 to 1845. Michel Laframboise, among others, met fur hunters here annually, where they camped with their families. In 1844 Charles Maria Weber and William Gulnac promoted the first white settlers' colony on "Rancho del Campo de Los Franceses" which included French Camp and the site of Stockton.

French Camp was also known as Castoria, the Latin word for "beaver" being "castor", reflecting its central role in the California Fur Rush.

French Camp was strategically sited at the southern end of the southernmost slough (which became known as French Camp Slough) of the Sacramento-San Joaquin Delta, maximizing the use of the waterway for ease of transportation. A trail led off from the site to the southeast into the foothills of the Sierra Nevada Mountains. It was subsequently used as an alternate route for the Mariposa Road, part of the Stockton-Los Angeles Road, especially favored during the rainy season because of its exceptional drainage. The route was eventually paved and exists to this day as "French Camp Road".

During WWII, Japanese Americans that lived in French Camp were relocated to civilian assembly centers and relocation centers overseen by the War Relocation Authority (WRA) in accordance with Executive Order 9066. Japanese Americans from French Camp were sent to the Turlock Assembly Center at the Stanislaus County Fair, Manzanar War Relocation Center, and the Gila River War Relocation Center. Accounts of the relocation and life in the camps are detailed through letters from former students of the French Camp Grammar School.

== People ==
- Scott Brooks, assistant coach for the Portland Trail Blazers.
- José M. Hernández, astronaut.
- Gilbert Luján, painter and sculptor.
- Phil Spector, record producer, musician, and songwriter (died in San Joaquin General Hospital).
- JoAnn Trejo, professor of pharmacology at the University of California, San Diego
- C. Bachmann and Charles H. Brandt founders of the Historical California Chicory Works, now The River Mill.

== Demographics ==
Historical population
Census	Pop.	Note	%±
1990	3,018		—
2000	4,109		36.1%
2010	3,376		−17.8%
2020	3,770		11.7%
U.S. Decennial Census; 1860–1870 1880-1890; 1900 1910 1920; 1930 1940 1950; 1960 1970 1980; 1990 2000 2010

French Camp first appeared as a census designated place in the 1990 U.S. census.

=== Racial and ethnic composition ===
French Camp CDP, California – Racial and ethnic composition Note: the US Census treats Hispanic/Latino as an ethnic category. This table excludes Latinos from the racial categories and assigns them to a separate category. Hispanics/Latinos may be of any race.
Race / Ethnicity (NH = Non-Hispanic)	Pop 2000	Pop 2010	Pop 2020	% 2000	% 2010	% 2020
White alone (NH)	1,482	969	753	36.07%	28.70%	19.97%
Black or African American alone (NH)	491	400	387	11.95%	11.85%	10.27%
Native American or Alaska Native alone (NH)	15	16	3	0.37%	0.47%	0.08%
Asian alone (NH)	173	148	197	4.21%	4.38%	5.23%
Native Hawaiian or Pacific Islander alone (NH)	17	10	10	0.41%	0.30%	0.27%
Other race alone (NH)	3	25	10	0.07%	0.74%	0.27%
Mixed race or Multiracial (NH)	81	60	53	1.97%	1.78%	1.41%
Hispanic or Latino (any race)	1,847	1,748	2,357	44.95%	51.78%	62.52%
Total	4,109	3,376	3,770	100.00%	100.00%	100.00%

=== 2020 census ===
As of the 2020 census, French Camp had a population of 3,770 and a population density of 1,218.5 inhabitants per square mile (470.5/km^{2}). The median age was 34.6 years. The age distribution was 13.8% under the age of 18, 14.1% aged 18 to 24, 42.0% aged 25 to 44, 23.4% aged 45 to 64, and 6.7% aged 65 or older. For every 100 females, there were 185.6 males, and for every 100 females age 18 and over, there were 203.8 males age 18 and over.

The census reported that 46.3% of the population lived in households, 16.9% lived in non-institutionalized group quarters, and 36.9% were institutionalized. The population was 100.0% urban and 0.0% rural.

There were 519 households, of which 40.1% had children under the age of 18 living in them. Of all households, 53.9% were married-couple households, 8.1% were cohabiting couple households, 17.5% were households with a male householder and no spouse or partner present, and 20.4% were households with a female householder and no spouse or partner present. About 13.9% of households were one person households, including 5.8% with one person aged 65 or older. The average household size was 3.36. There were 412 families (79.4% of all households).

There were 563 housing units at an average density of 182.0 units per square mile (70.3 units/km^{2}). Of these, 7.8% were vacant and 92.2% were occupied. Among occupied units, 54.5% were owner-occupied and 45.5% were occupied by renters. The homeowner vacancy rate was 0.7%, and the rental vacancy rate was 4.5%.

Racial composition as of the 2020 census
Race	Number	Percent
White	1,034	27.4%
Black or African American	406	10.8%
American Indian and Alaska Native	30	0.8%
Asian	207	5.5%
Native Hawaiian and Other Pacific Islander	10	0.3%
Some other race	1,837	48.7%
Two or more races	246	6.5%

=== Income and poverty ===
In 2023, the US Census Bureau estimated that the median household income was $93,523, and the per capita income was $17,891. About 13.9% of families and 22.6% of the population were below the poverty line.

=== 2010 census ===
At the 2010 census French Camp had a population of 3,376. The population density was 1,074.2 inhabitants per square mile (414.8/km^{2}). The racial makeup of French Camp was 1,678 (49.7%) White, 410 (12.1%) African American, 31 (0.9%) Native American, 163 (4.8%) Asian, 11 (0.3%) Pacific Islander, 920 (27.3%) from other races, and 163 (4.8%) from two or more races. Hispanic or Latino of any race were 1,748 persons (51.8%).

The census reported that 1,622 people (48.0% of the population) lived in households, 336 (10.0%) lived in non-institutionalized group quarters, and 1,418 (42.0%) were institutionalized.

There were 509 households, 202 (39.7%) had children under the age of 18 living in them, 262 (51.5%) were opposite-sex married couples living together, 64 (12.6%) had a female householder with no husband present, 46 (9.0%) had a male householder with no wife present. There were 46 (9.0%) unmarried opposite-sex partnerships, and 3 (0.6%) same-sex married couples or partnerships. 104 households (20.4%) were one person and 43 (8.4%) had someone living alone who was 65 or older. The average household size was 3.19. There were 372 families (73.1% of households); the average family size was 3.71.

The age distribution was 731 people (21.7%) under the age of 18, 604 people (17.9%) aged 18 to 24, 1,145 people (33.9%) aged 25 to 44, 660 people (19.5%) aged 45 to 64, and 236 people (7.0%) who were 65 or older. The median age was 30.1 years. For every 100 females, there were 193.1 males. For every 100 females age 18 and over, there were 208.6 males.

There were 575 housing units at an average density of 183.0 per square mile, of the occupied units 276 (54.2%) were owner-occupied and 233 (45.8%) were rented. The homeowner vacancy rate was 3.5%; the rental vacancy rate was 13.4%. 872 people (25.8% of the population) lived in owner-occupied housing units and 750 people (22.2%) lived in rental housing units.

== Education ==
It is in the Manteca Unified School District.
