= National Register of Historic Places listings in San Joaquin County, California =

Location of San Joaquin County in California

This is a list of the National Register of Historic Places listings in San Joaquin County, California.

This is intended to be a complete list of the properties and districts on the National Register of Historic Places in San Joaquin County, California, United States. Latitude and longitude coordinates are provided for many National Register properties and districts; these locations may be seen together in an online map.

There are 36 properties and districts listed on the National Register in the county.

This National Park Service list is complete through NPS recent listings posted September 4, 2026.

== Current listings ==
	Name on the Register	Image	Date listed	Location	City or town	Description
1	Bank of Italy	Bank of Italy	July 18, 1985 (#85001591)	628 Central Ave. 37°44′08″N 121°25′28″W	Tracy	
2	Bank of Tracy	Bank of Tracy	June 3, 1980 (#80000851)	803 Central Ave. 37°44′13″N 121°25′29″W	Tracy	
3	Cole's Five Cypress Farm		May 25, 1988 (#88000578)	11221 E. Eight Mile Rd. 38°03′39″N 121°10′57″W	Stockton	
4	Commercial and Savings Bank	Commercial and Savings Bank	November 25, 1980 (#80000849)	343 Main St. 37°57′13″N 121°17′01″W	Stockton	
5	El Dorado Elementary School	El Dorado Elementary School	August 15, 1977 (#77000335)	1525 Pacific Avenue; 37°58′02″N 121°17′54″W	Stockton	Now used as the Stockton School for Adults
6	Elks Building	Elks Building	June 3, 1980 (#80004606)	42 N. Sutter St. 37°57′48″N 121°17′05″W	Stockton	
7	Farmer's and Merchant's Bank	Farmer's and Merchant's Bank	October 9, 1980 (#80000850)	11 S. San Joaquin St. 37°57′11″N 121°17′12″W	Stockton	
8	Fox California Theater	Fox California Theater	June 27, 1979 (#79000540)	242 E. Main St. 37°57′09″N 121°17′12″W	Stockton	
9	Wong K. Gew Mansion	Wong K. Gew Mansion	September 20, 1978 (#78000761)	345 W. Clay St. 37°56′21″N 121°17′29″W	Stockton	
10	Harmony Grove Church	Harmony Grove Church	January 3, 2011 (#10001103)	11455 E. Locke Rd. 38°08′50″N 121°10′34″W	Lockeford	
11	Benjamin Holt House	Benjamin Holt House	March 2, 1982 (#82002254)	548 Park St. 37°57′37″N 121°17′04″W	Stockton	
12	Hotel Lodi	Hotel Lodi	September 29, 1995 (#95001140)	5 S. School St. 38°08′02″N 121°16′24″W	Lodi	
13	Hotel Stockton	Hotel Stockton	April 1, 1981 (#81000174)	133 E. Weber Ave. 37°57′15″N 121°17′18″W	Stockton	
14	I.O.O.F. Hall	I.O.O.F. Hall	April 22, 1982 (#82002257)	Main St. 38°09′17″N 121°17′59″W	Woodbridge	
15	IOOF Lodge No. 355		March 1, 2007 (#07000085)	18819 East CA 88; 38°11′30″N 121°05′06″W	Clements	
16	Locke House and Barn		June 19, 1972 (#72000252)	19960 W. Elliott Rd. 38°09′53″N 121°08′59″W	Lockeford	
17	Locke's Meat Market	Locke's Meat Market	February 19, 1982 (#82002253)	13480 CA 88; 38°09′48″N 121°08′57″W	Lockeford	
18	Lodi Arch	Lodi Arch	September 17, 1980 (#80000848)	Pine St. 38°08′03″N 121°16′15″W	Lodi	
19	Morse-Skinner Ranch House		August 21, 1986 (#86001878)	13063 N. CA 99; 38°05′51″N 121°15′35″W	Lodi	
20	Nippon Hospital	Nippon Hospital	September 18, 1978 (#78000762)	25 S. Commerce St. 37°57′07″N 121°17′30″W	Stockton	
21	John Ohm House	John Ohm House	February 4, 1982 (#82002256)	31524 S. Kasson Rd. 37°40′04″N 121°15′39″W	Tracy	
22	Old Weber School	Old Weber School	July 16, 1973 (#73000445)	55 W. Flora St. 37°57′38″N 121°17′36″W	Stockton	
23	Philomathean Clubhouse	Philomathean Clubhouse	January 5, 2009 (#08001278)	1000 North Hunter Street; 37°57′47″N 121°17′28″W	Stockton	
24	Moses Rodgers House	Moses Rodgers House	April 26, 1978 (#78000763)	921 S. San Joaquin St. 37°56′37″N 121°17′02″W	Stockton	
25	Sperry Office Building	Sperry Office Building	February 19, 1982 (#82002255)	146 W. Weber Ave. 37°57′10″N 121°17′35″W	Stockton	
26	Sperry Union Flour Mill	Sperry Union Flour Mill	January 31, 1979 (#79000541)	445 W. Weber; 37°57′11″N 121°17′44″W	Stockton	
27	Stockton Savings and Loan Society Bank	Stockton Savings and Loan Society Bank	October 19, 1978 (#78000764)	301 E. Main St. 37°57′13″N 121°17′09″W	Stockton	
28	Terminous Culling Chute		April 19, 1984 (#84001189)	14900 W. CA 12; 38°06′35″N 121°29′57″W	Lodi	
29	Tracy City Hall and Jail	Tracy City Hall and Jail	October 18, 1979 (#79000542)	25 W. 7th St. 37°44′09″N 121°25′31″W	Tracy	
30	Tracy Inn	Tracy Inn	October 31, 1980 (#80000852)	24 W. 11th St. 37°44′22″N 121°25′31″W	Tracy	
31	Tretheway Block	Tretheway Block	October 29, 1982 (#82000987)	229 E. Weber St. 37°57′06″N 121°17′14″W	Stockton	
32	USCGC Fir	USCGC Fir	April 27, 1992 (#92001880)		Stockton	Listed in Seattle, but is actually in California.
33	U.S. Post Office	U.S. Post Office	February 10, 1983 (#83001236)	401 N. San Joaquin St. 37°57′27″N 121°17′17″W	Stockton	
34	West Side Bank	West Side Bank	December 12, 1978 (#78000765)	47 W. 6th St. 37°44′06″N 121°25′32″W	Tracy	
35	Woman's Club of Lodi	Woman's Club of Lodi	May 20, 1988 (#88000555)	325 W. Pine St. 38°08′05″N 121°16′34″W	Lodi	
36	Woodbridge Masonic Lodge No. 131	Woodbridge Masonic Lodge No. 131	April 20, 1989 (#89000318)	1040 Augusta St. 38°09′14″N 121°18′03″W	Woodbridge	

== See also ==
- List of National Historic Landmarks in California
- National Register of Historic Places listings in California
- California Historical Landmarks in San Joaquin County, California
