= List of Stockton landmarks =

The city of Stockton, California has historical buildings and sites, including some which appear on the National Register of Historic Places and California Historical Landmark lists.

== Historic sites ==
- Site of first building in present city of Stockton (1844), Civic Court between Center and El Dorado streets. Thomas Lindsay built a tule hut on this site in 1844, shortly after the first settlers arrived at Rancho Campo de los Franceses. Lindsay was later murdered by Indians and buried here by travelers. The site is home to City Hall, and is #178, Lindsay Poin, on the Office of Historic Preservation's California Historical Landmark list.
- Burial place of John Brown (1859), 1100 East Weber Street at North Union Street. John Brown, Stockton resident from 1851 to 1859, is notable for his four-day ride from Los Angeles to San Francisco to warn Commodore Stockton of the attack on Los Angeles. As a result of his actions, troops were sent to secure the city, and Brown - nicknamed Juan Flaco - became known as the 'Paul Revere of California.' He is buried in the former Citizen's Cemetery near this site, which is #513 on the Office of Historic Preservation's California Historical Landmark list.
- Weber Point (1850), 221 North Center Street. The point is the site of a two-story adobe-and-redwood house, Weber Point Home, built in 1850 by Captain Charles Maria Weber, founder and pioneer developer of Stockton. One of the first elaborate residences and landscaped gardens in the San Joaquin Valley, it was Captain Weber's home until his death in 1881. Today the 9.7-acre (39,000 m^{2}) site is home to the Weber Point Event Center, which includes the Great Circle, Plaza, step Amphitheater, children's play area, an interactive water feature, Point Amphitheater, main stage, and waterfront promenade. The site was added to the city register by resolution number 30,304 on March 12, 1973, and is #165 on the Office of Historic Preservation's California Historical Landmark list.
- Temple Israel Cemetery (1851), East Acacia Street between North Pilgrim and North Union streets. In 1851, the cemetery site was donated to the Jewish community by Captain Charles Maria Weber. The site is the oldest Jewish cemetery in continuous use in California and west of the Rocky Mountains, and is #765 on the Office of Historic Preservation's California Historical Landmark list.
- County Courthouse Site (1853), 222 E Weber Avenue. Charles Weber donated the site to the city, despite his preference for the site of the old Franklin school, located at the confluence of Washington, Center, Lafayette, and Commerce streets. As the Hunter Square site was more centrally located, and was also the largest unbuilt area in the city, Weber agreed to donate the land, on condition that a central plaza be included in the plans. Hunter Square was created by filling in the slough on the west side of the block, and the first courthouse was constructed in 1853 (dedicated 1854). The current county courthouse sits on the site today. It was added to the city register by resolution number 30,102 on November 20, 1972.
- County Jail Site (1893), northeast corner of San Joaquin and Channel streets. Nicknamed "Cunningham's Castle," the fortress-like structure featured round masonry towers, turrets with conical roofs, short robust columns, contrasting stone colors, and rough-faced stonework. The Richardsonian Romanesque design was popular during the 1890s, and got its nickname from its medieval appearance as well as its construction during the term of Sheriff Thomas Cunningham. Construction began in 1891, but financial problems delayed completion until 1893. When it was finished, the three-story brick building was designed to hold 75 prisoners - eight cells in a semicircle on the first two floors and six in the basement. Additional cells housed women and witnesses. With a continually growing population, however, the jail was soon operating beyond capacity; the jail averaged a population of over 400 inmates by the late 1940s. Deteriorating lime mortar and complaints of inhumane conditions led to the jail being abandoned in 1958 and torn down in 1961. In 1972, the City Council added the site to the city register by resolution number 30,101 on November 20, 1972.
- Miner Levee Site (1927), north side of Stockton Channel between Harrison and Lincoln streets. The site was added to the city register by resolution number 33,837 on January 31, 1977.
- Temporary Detention Camps at the San Joaquin County Fairgrounds (1942), Airport Way. With the outbreak of World War II and the tendency to detain Japanese-Americans "for their own safety," the Stockton Assembly Center housed 4,217 San Joaquin County residents from May 10 to October 17, 1942, under Executive Order 9066. The site is the Administration Building at the fairgrounds, and is #934 on the Office of Historic Preservation's California Historical Landmark list.
- Reuel Colt Gridley Monument, Stockton Rural Cemetery near Memory Chapel, Cemetery Lane and East Pine Street. The memorial was erected by Rawlins Post of the Grand Army of the Republic and the citizens of Stockton in honor of Reuel Colt Gridley, who rendered services to Union soldiers during the War of the Rebellion when he collected $275,000 for the Sanitary Commission by selling and reselling a sack of flour. The memorial is #801 on the Office of Historic Preservation's California Historical Landmark list.

== Homes ==
- Benjamin Holt Home (1869). 548 E Park St. Benjamin Holt's home was constructed in 1869 by his father-in-law Benjamin Brown in the Greek Revival style. Square blocks, tall windows, high peaks, and a solid, square frame are hallmarks of the house. These were unusual in a time when most homes were built in Gothic style. The lower floor contained many small rooms that would have been useful for entertaining or receiving guests; the main floor contained the kitchen, and the second floor housed a smaller kitchen and several small rooms connected to a long hallway. At the time of Holt's best-known invention, his home was fairly secluded and took up an entire city, his closest neighbors being a brewery and the asylum on North American Street. A New Hampshire native, Holt and his brothers had started a wagon spoke and wheel business, which they expanded to the west coast when they moved to Stockton in 1883. Their Stockton Wheel Company manufactured wooden and metal wheels, which mostly went into the construction of streetcars. In 1892, the company was renamed the Holt Manufacturing Company, moved to Aurora Street, and became one of the city's first large businesses to bring recognition to the city. The company produced the Combined Harvester, a piece of farming equipment similar to a tractor that was pulled by 26 mules and horses, and eventually sold it throughout the United States and the rest of the world. After November 1909, the company produced and sold a Caterpillar track-type tractor, the design later influencing the construction of armored tanks. The home was added to the city register by resolution number 29,100 on June 7, 1971. The site is #82002254 on the National Register of Historic Places, and was added on March 2, 1982, and is home to the Martin Gipson Center of the San Joaquin County Health Care Services Agency's Mental Health Division. On March 20, 2015, the house was bought by Hendrik and Robin Valk and is currently being restored to its original state.
- Swett-Moreing Home (1883). 143 W Acacia St. The California Eastlake style (combination of Queen Anne and Eastlake) home was constructed for William Swett in 1883 by San Francisco architects Samuel and Joseph Newsom. Swett was a staff member at the Stockton Mail newspaper, and his family lived in the home until it was sold in 1891. Cyrus Moering Sr., a rancher and contractor, purchased the home 1898 and lived there until his death in 1911. Moering headed the firm of Cyrus Moreing & Sons, which held many of the largest construction contracts for the bond highways in San Joaquin County. Moering was also an elected councilman for the Second Ward, and owned a baseball team. The home was damaged by fire sometime between 2015 and 2016 and has since been demolished. The home was added to the city register by resolution number 39,263 on July 26, 1982.
- Newell Home (1888) 1107 N San Joaquin St, in the Magnolia Historic Preservation District. This Queen Anne–style home was built for Sidney Newell, a banker for Stockton Savings Bank as well as a steamboat company executive, and his wife Anna Elizabeth (Upslone). The Samuel and Joseph Newsom design features a hipped gable roof with a corbelled chimney on the south side (with a bargeboard, pendant, and vents), turned posts, delicate woodwork, and a stained glass window in the entry. The home was added to the city register by resolution number 29,170 on July 6, 1971.
- Charles E. Owen Home (1890). 1119 N San Joaquin St, in the Magnolia Historic Preservation District. The 2 1/2-story Queen Anne–style home was constructed for Charles Owen next to the home of the man who conveyed him the deed. Built at a cost of $10,000, it was completed in February 1890. It was sold in 1909 to William Brennan, owner of a leading livery stable. The home features a gabled roof with boxed eaves, lights, and shingles in the gables, bay windows with double-hung sashes, and wooden steps to the porch. It also has a hitching post in the front yard, one of the few left in Stockton. Owen was an accomplished musician, and had composed pieces that were published in San Francisco and Boston. The home is remarkable for its craftsmanship, as well as the quick construction timeline, remarkable for the 1890s. It was added to the city register by resolution number 34,629 on November 7, 1977.
- Dr. Cross House (1890). 207 W Acacia St. The home was added to the city register by resolution number 85–0597 on September 23, 1985, and today is a bed-and-breakfast known as the Old Victorian Inn.
- Moses Rodgers House (1898). 921 S San Joaquin St. The San Francisco-style home, with its bay window, tongue and groove siding, and wrap-around porch, was constructed for Missouri native - and African-American - Moses Rogers. Rogers was born a slave, but became a mining engineer and came to California for the Gold Rush in 1848. He quickly became known as an expert in the state, and investors went to him for advice regarding mining claims. Rogers moved his family to Stockton so that his five daughters would receive a good education, something that the schools were able to provide. The home is notable because of its architectural style, as well as the fact that it was owned by an African-American family. It is #78000763 on the National Register of Historic Places and was listed in 1978. It was added to the city register by resolution number 35,546 August 28, 1978.
- Edward B. Condy Home (1893). 820 N Madison St. The home was added to the city register by resolution number 34,112 on May 9, 1977.
- Dunne Home (1895). 1335 N Hunter St. Built for Edward Dunne, a local shoe store owner, in 1895, this home's design combines elements of Eastlake, Stick, and Queen Anne styles. It features a collection of original stained glass windows. This home appears to have been enlarged, as the Dunne family grew, by attaching wings salvaged from other structures, which probably accounts for the home's extreme diversity of Victorian styles. This home is often referred to as Stockton's "Mystery House" and was added to the city register by resolution number 38,208 on May 11, 1981.
- Superintendent's Home (1900). Stockton State Hospital, 521 E. Acacia Street, in the Magnolia Historic Preservation District. National Register of Historic Places The home was added to the city register by resolution number 29,086 on June 1, 1971.
- Hurrle-Weston Home (1906). 5 E Harding Way. Once known as "The White Queen of Stockton," the home was added to the city register by resolution number 29,100 on June 7, 1971, and today houses the Maxine's Bridal Shop (now closed).
- Knox-Baxter-Sullivan Mansion (1910). 205 E. Magnolia. Built by Lee A. Phillips, and designed by Edgar B. Brown, who is also known for designing the Stockton Hotel (1910) and the Children's Home of Stockton (1912). This Craftsman style, shingle bungalow has been home for many prominent Stocktonians. Sitting on an impressive 0.48 acreage in the civic center and still showcases the old carriage house down the alley. The home boast beautiful carpentry work throughout and was featured in Sunset Magazine in 1989.
- The Henery Apartments (1913). 121 S Sutter St. This French Second Empire style brick and terra cotta building features a Mansard roof, arched windows, decorative surrounds, cornices with medallions, and decorative brackets. Designed by Glen Allen, whose firm is also known for Goold and John's Tudor Flats (1924) at 938-944 North Sutter Street, Stockton Memorial Civic Auditorium (1924), First Church of Christ Scientist (1928), and the Jewish Community Center (1928). The building was added to the city register by resolution number 86–0294 on May 19, 1986.
- Wong K. Gew Mansion (1921). 345 W Clay St. Designed by architect Peter Sala and constructed in a Classical Neo-Georgian style (1900–24) by Losekann & Clowdsley, the home was one of the most costly in Stockton by the time it was completed in 1921. Gew had arrived in New York in 1900, and moved to Stockton in 1910, operating gambling establishments and acting as a partner in the construction of the Lincoln Hotel. At the time, city ordinance prohibited Chinese people from establishing homes north of Main Street, so Gew chose a large plot of land on Clay Street for his Southern-style home with twelve rooms (including two sleeping rooms for servants), a marble fireplace, Honduras mahogany, columns, classical windows, and a balcony. Gew is noted for breaking through several cultural and racial barriers, including hiring a Caucasian architect to design his home, as well as the fact that he was a well-respected Chinese businessman who had money, owned a car, and built an extravagant home outside of the area covered by the ordinance. The home is #78000761 on the National Register of Historic Places, and was added on September 20, 1978. It was added to the city register by resolution number 30,834 on November 5, 1973.
- Wong House (1924). 704 N Stockton St. The home was added to the city register by resolution number 38,553 on September 8, 1981.
- Cole's Five Cypress Farm. 11221 E Eight Mile Rd. Constructed in Italianate and Greek Revival styles (1850–1924) by Joseph H. Cole, the home is #88000578 on the National Register of Historic Places, and was added on May 25, 1988. Also known as Parker Place, the home is a private dwelling.

== Hospitals ==
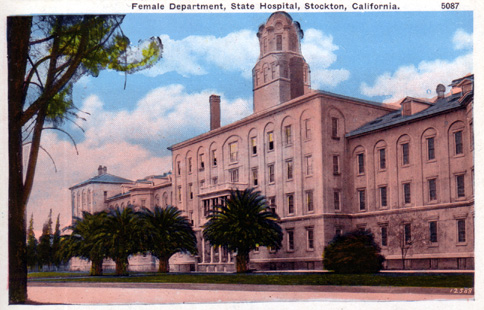
- Stockton State Hospital
  Stockton State Hospital or the Stockton Developmental Center (1853). 510 East Magnolia Street. Constructed as the Insane Asylum of California at Stockton in 1853, the complex was situated on 100 acres (0.40 km^{2}) of land donated by Captain Weber. The legislature at the time felt that existing hospitals were incapable of caring for the large numbers of people who suffered from mental and emotional conditions as a result of the Gold Rush, and authorized the creation of the first public mental health hospital in California. The hospital is one of the oldest in the west, and was notable for its progressive forms of treatment. The hospital is #1016 on the Office of Historic Preservation's California Historical Landmark list, and today the site is home to California State University Stanislaus - Stockton Center.
- Nippon Hospital (1919), 25 South Commerce Street. Built in a Classical Revival style with gable crowns, colored brick, and classic Greek architecture, the two-story, 4,864-square-foot (451.9 m^{2}) structure was constructed in 1919 in response to the inadequate care that Japanese people received during an influenza outbreak the previous year. Named for the Japanese word for "Japan," the hospital featured 30 hospital rooms, a surgery suite, and an ethnic kitchen. Due to its central location within the Japanese area of Stockton, as well as racial discrimination from Chinese and non-Asians elsewhere, the hospital catered exclusively to Stockton's Japanese population of approximately 4,300 - one of the largest in the United States. The hospital incorporated in 1922, and reorganized in 1925, only to close its doors in 1930 due to financial matters. The building was later used as the Hotel Bryant until 1978, when the Stockton City Council placed it on the historical landmark list by resolution number 35,548 on August 28, 1978. As the building itself is the only remaining structure from the early Japanese community in Stockton, it was also listed on the National Register of Historic Places as #78000762 on September 18, 1978.

== Religious Facilities ==
- Original Temple Israel (1855). 821 North American Street, in the Magnolia Historic Preservation District. The oldest building on the city register, the building was added to the city register by resolution number 39,264 on July 26, 1982.
- St. Mary's Church (1861), 203 East Washington Street. The first Roman Catholic church in the San Joaquin Valley was constructed on two lots donated by Captain Charles Maria Weber on Washington and Hunter Streets. The location was ideal, due to its proximity to its primary population of Mexican, Spanish, Chilean, and French parishioners. The first church was a wooden structure, but the present brick Gothic design was dedicated in 1862. An additional to the north of the building was constructed in 1870, and the Gothic spire in 1893. Additional renovations were completed between 1945 and 1949. The adjacent parish is a two-story Classic Revival brick building constructed in 1905. The church used Washington Park, across the street, for religious festivities until it was replaced by the Crosstown Freeway in 1977. The building was added to the city register by resolution number 29,086 on June 1, 1971.
- St. John's Episcopal Church (1892). 115 East Miner Avenue, in the Magnolia Historic Preservation District. Built by members of the third-oldest Episcopal parish on the West Coast, this cruciform Norman-style church featured a piece of stained glass from the old church, which was placed over the west door and today is the oldest stained glass in San Joaquin Valley. In ensuing years, the church added memorial windows that were of Victorian (earth tones and pastels) and European styles (bold reds, greens, and blues. The parish unofficially started in 1850, but received its charter in 1858 as part of the Diocese of California. A brick building was constructed on land donated by Captain Charles Weber, and features a pipe organ from Boston, the pipes of which are still in use today. A Nordic-style Guild Hall was constructed in 1889, only to be replaced three years later by the current structure. The parish joined the new Missionary District of San Joaquin in 1911 after separating from the main diocese. In the 1950s, the vestry began purchasing several surrounding buildings for use in its ministries, including the former Chase Chevrolet facilities. The church was added to the city register by resolution number 29,100 on June 7, 1971, and is known today as the Episcopal Church of St. John the Evangelist.
- St. Agnes School & Convent (1914–20). 640 North San Joaquin Street, in the Magnolia Historic Preservation District. The building was added to the city register by resolution number 86–0503 on August 11, 1986.
- Sikh Gurdwara (1915), 1930 South Sikh Temple Street. Sikh place of worship constructed by Sikhs, who came to the San Joaquin Valley in the early 1900s because of its similarities to the Punjab region, the Gurdwara was one of the first religious centers for Sikhs in the United States. A more modern gurdwara was built in 1930; the original building has been modified into a library, and is #1039 on the Office of Historic Preservation's California Historical Landmark list. It is either the first or second Gurdwara built outside of India. Sikhism is the 5th biggest religion making the Sikh temple of Stockton that much more significant. It is a historical place of worship and members of the Sikh Community from all over come to visit.
- First Church of Christ Scientist (1928), 801 North Center Street. Designed by Allen and Young, who are also known for the Henery Apartments (1913), Goold and John's Tudor Flats (1924) at 938-944 North Sutter Street, Stockton Memorial Civic Auditorium (1924), and the Jewish Community Center (1928). The building was added to the city register by resolution number 95–0107 on March 20, 1995.
- Jewish Community Center (1928), 1337 North Madison Street. Designed by Allen and Young, who are also known for the Henery Apartments (1913), Goold and John's Tudor Flats (1924) at 938-944 North Sutter Street, Stockton Memorial Civic Auditorium (1924), and the First Church of Christ Scientist (1928). The building was added to the city register by resolution number 36,741 on November 13, 1979.

== Commercial Buildings ==
- B & M Building (1860s), 125 Bridge Pl. The building was added to the city register by resolution number 40,069 on August 29, 1983.
- Wagner Leather Co. Engine Room (1876), 122 E Oak St. The building was added to the city register by resolution number 30,809 on October 15, 1973.
- The Sperry Building (1888), 146 W Weber Ave. This Victorian Commercial–style building served as the offices for Sperry Flour Company, and was designed by local architect Charles Beasley; in 1917, an addition was constructed to the rear of this building, which matched the original exactly. The Sperry Building was added to the city register by resolution number 29,086 on June 1, 1971. It is #82002255 on the National Register of Historic Places, and was added in 1982 as the Sperry Office Building. Today it houses the headquarters for Stockton's professional soccer team, the California Cougars.
- Sperry Flour Company (1888), 445 W Weber Ave. Constructed by Charles Beasley in an Early Commercial Gothic style (prevalent from 1875 to 1899 and 1900–24), the building is #79000541 on the National Register of Historic Places, and was added in 1979. It was added to the city register by resolution number 39,265 on July 26, 1982, and is home to the Stockton Cougars.
- Tretheway Building (1892), 229 E Weber Ave. Originally constructed as the Argonaut Hotel, with a hardware store at street level, this Queen Anne–style structure includes Romanesque and Moorish elements of cast zinc floral patterns and sandstone. When constructed, the building had a taller false front parapet, which fell during the San Francisco earthquake in 1906; when the false front was reconstructed, it assumed a lower profile. The building is #82000987 on the National Register of Historic Places, and was added in 1982 as the Tretheway Block. The building was added to the city register by resolution number 38,554 on September 8, 1981.
- Santa Fe Depot (1900), 735 S San Joaquin St. The building was added to the city register by resolution number 30,103 on November 20, 1972
- Street Car Barns and Offices (1907), 2850 N California St. The building was added to the city register by resolution number 85–0307 on May 13, 1985.
- Engine House No. 3 (1908), 19 N Pilgrim St. The building was added to the city register by resolution number 31,720 on October 7, 1974.
- Genova Bakery (1908), 749 N Sierra Nevada St. The building was added to the city register by resolution number 85–0325 on May 28, 1985.
- Stockton Savings & Loan Society Bank (1908), 301 E Main St. This Classic Revival–style building was designed by San Francisco architects Myers and Ward, and featured Stockton's first revolving door as well as a marble interior. Known as "Stockton's first skyscraper," this was the third building to serve as headquarters for Stockton Savings & Loan (now of Stockton.com/ Bank of Stockton). The top two floors have always been home to the Yosemite Club, the oldest private club in California. The building is #78000764 on the National Register of Historic Places and was added in 1978. The building was added to the city register by resolution number 34,630 on November 7, 1977. The building is home to the downtown office of the Bank of Stockton.
- Sears Roebuck Building (1910–16). 620 N Aurora St. The building was added to the city register by resolution number 86–0274 on May 12, 1986.
- The Hotel Stockton (1910), 133 E Weber Ave, Stockton Weber and El Dorado streets. Constructed in a Mission/Spanish Revival style by local businessmen Lee A. Phillips, Frank A. West, Samuel Frankenheimer, and Edgar B. Brown (architect), the hotel was constructed on a parcel known as "Weber Hold," at the head of the Stockton Channel. As the first reinforced concrete structure in the Central Valley, the hotel was constructed at a cost of $500,000. When it opened for business on May 25, 1910, it included 252 rooms (200 with private baths) and a roof garden with a fountain and pergola. The hotel underwent an extensive renovation in 1950 at a cost of $200,000, but was the victim of poor timing. The increasing use of automobiles led to more convenient roadside motels with ample parking, and rising costs, led the hotel to close on November 26, 1960. For a number of years, the building was home to numerous county offices, including the Department of Public Assistance, due to the demolition of the old courthouse. However, the county offices vacated in 1992 when they moved into new facilities. Since then, the old hotel has been restored, and officially reopened to the public on March 17, 2005; it features exact replicas of the oak railings and wainscoting, the original fireplace, and restored leaded stained glass panels. The upper floors now contain 156 apartments for low- and fixed-income residents, as well as a 10,000-square-foot (930 m^{2}) rooftop terrace. The building is #81000174 on the National Register of Historic Places and was added on April 1, 1981. The building was added to the city register by resolution number 29,086 on June 1, 1971.
- Commercial & Savings Bank (1915), 343 E Main St. This Beaux Arts-Renaissance Revival–style building was built by Dietrich & Liestern Construction in 1915 for the Commercial & Savings Bank. After sustaining heavy fire damage in 1923, the building was repaired and doubled in size along the Sutter Street side. Later owners included the Bank of America and the Grupe Corporation. The building is #80000849 on the National Register of Historic Places and was added on November 25, 1980. The building was added to the city register by resolution number 85–0306 on May 13, 1985, and is home to the Cort Companies.
- Farmer's and Merchant's Bank (1917), 11 S San Joaquin St. Constructed in an Italian Renaissance style by San Francisco architect George W. Kelham, the building features 25-foot (7.6 m) high coffered ceilings ornamented with painted plaster, and a central lobby with Tennessee marble floors and walls and pillars of Travertine marble from the region near Rome. It was added to the city register by resolution number 36,120 on April 2, 1979; it was added to the National Register of Historic Places as #80000850 on October 9, 1980. Now known as the California Building, the structure is home to several professional offices.
- Medico-Dental Building (1927), 242 N Sutter St. Designed by Frank V. Mayo, also known for designing the Manson Apartment (1936) at 345 East Acacia Street, this twelve-story Commercial Gothic was built exclusively for medical and dental professionals; the cornerstone reads “Dedicated to the Practice of Medical Service and to the Service of Humanity.” The lower exterior features gray terra cotta, and the decorative Gothic entrance motif is repeated on the tenth through twelfth floors. The building was added to the city register by resolution number 39,045 on May 3, 1982.
- Fox California Theatre (1930), 242 E Main St. The first theatre on the site, the T & D Photoplay, was constructed by the Wilhoit family and used for a variety of entertainment acts. In 1921, Fox West Coast Theaters leased and remodeled the building, renaming it the California; it was demolished in 1929 to make way for a more modern theatre. Fox signed a long-term lease (50 years), and spent nearly $500,000 on the Colonial Revival style (1925–49) cement and steel structure that was built by Beller Construction Co and Balch & Stanberry. At the time, the theatre was the largest vaudeville house in California, with 2,170 seats and a $40,000 three-manual (keyboards) Wurlitzer pipe organ with twin pipe chambers. The new theatre opened on October 14, 1930, with opening acts that included comedy skits as well as the latest "talkie" movies. The next 10 years featured movies as well as stage acts including Al Jolson, the Marx Brothers, Ted Lewis, and Henry Lauder, and the 1940s through the 1960s featured big bands such as Duke Ellington, Paul Whiteman, and the Dorseys. Westland Theatres bought the theatre in 1971, but closed in 1973 due to declining attendance. Amid concerns about demolishment, Edward C. Merlo and Madelein Lawton purchased the theatre in 1979 and were able to get it placed on the National Register of Historic Places, making it one of only two movie palaces left in the Central Valley. Between 1981 and 1988, several rock, jazz, and country music acts performed, without much fanfare. In 1991, the city's Redevelopment Agency included the theatre as part of its efforts to revitalize the downtown area; renovations began in 1995, and in 2000 the Merlo Fox Building Trust donated the building to the city. A refurbished 1928 Robert Morton pipe organ was placed in the now-named Bob Hope Theatre, and renovations were completed in 2004 with funds from the United States Congress and the California Heritage Fund. The theatre officially reopened to the public on September 18, 2005. It is #79000540 on the National Register of Historic Places, and was added on June 27, 1979. It was added to the city register by resolution number 86–0469 on August 4, 1986.

== Schools ==
- Weber Primary School (1873). 55 West Flora Street, in the Magnolia Historic Preservation District. The building was added to the city register by resolution number 29,100 on June 7, 1971. It is #73000445 on the National Register of Historic Places, and was added as the Old Weber School in 1973.
- El Dorado Elementary School (1916), 1525 Pacific Avenue and Harding Way. The school is a Tudor Revival style (1900–49), constructed by William Wright. The building is #77000335 on the National Register of Historic Places, and was added on August 15, 1977. It was added to the city register by resolution number 34,306 on July 11, 1977.
- Luther Burbank School (1925), 1130 South Pilgrim Street. The building was added to the city register by resolution number 35,547 on August 28, 1978.

== Civic and Community Buildings ==
- Philomathean Clubhouse (1911). 1000 North Hunter Street in the Magnolia Historic Preservation District. Designed in a bungalow style by architect W.E. Wood and completed in February 1912, the Clubhouse features a wrap-around porch on the southern side of the building, as well as a large entry hall with a central staircase that leads to the second floor ballroom. The first floor has a 26x30 ft club room and two libraries (one on each wide of the main entry), and the 40x72 foot second floor ballroom features a 16x25 ft stage. The Philomathean, meaning "lovers of learning", was founded by a group of Stockton women who had been meeting as a history study club since 1893 and wanted their own facility. Today, the club is owned by the Philomathean Foundation, and is available to the public for weddings, parties, and other social gatherings. It was added to the city register by resolution number 01–0150 on March 3, 2001.
- Children's Home of Stockton (1912), 430 North Pilgrim Street. Designed by architect Edgar B. Brown, who is also known for designing the Stockton Hotel (1910) and the Knox-Baxter-Sullivan Mansion (1910) at 205 East Magnolia Street. The building was added to the city register by resolution number 99–0312 on June 22, 1999.
- City Hall and Civic Court (1923–26). 425 N El Dorado St. Home to the Mayor, City Manager, City Council chambers, and city administrative offices, this Grecian-Iconic style stone and marble structure was completed in 1926. The building's lobby features a coffered ceiling and decorative bronze electroliers. The building was added to the city register by resolution number 39,656 on March 14, 1983.
- Stockton Memorial Civic Auditorium (1924–25), 525 North Center Street. The city of Stockton constructed the Civic Auditorium as a venue for large community events, prompted by plans to commemorate the Stockton men who had been killed in World War I. The city wanted to create a central plaza fringed by the auditorium, the city hall, and the library, and decided on a site near McLeod Lake. A bond election was held in October 1920 to raise funds for site purchase and construction. Designed by Glenn Allen and the firm of Wright & Satterlee, construction began in 1924, was completed in 1925, and dedicated on Veteran's Day. The finished structure featured exterior brick walls with cement plaster finish (imitating Indiana limestone), interior brick walls covered with reinforced concrete or metal lath and plaster, roof and balcony of reinforced concrete, floors of white maple over a concrete sub-floor, and a roof of "Armso" iron over felt. It contains a 45' x 96' stage, twelve dressing rooms, nine committee rooms, a press room, and two dressing rooms for the lecture room stage. The building can accommodate 5,000 people, and was added to the city register by resolution number 90–0198 on March 15, 1990. Allen and Young are also known for the Henry Apartments (1913), Goold and John's Tudor Flats (1924) at 938-944 North Sutter Street, First Church of Christ Scientist (1928), and the Jewish Community Center (1928).
- Federal Building (1933). 401 North San Joaquin Street, in the Magnolia Historic Preservation District. Constructed by Howard G. Bissell and Bliss & Fairweather, the building is #83001236 on the National Register of Historic Places, and was added in 1983. It was added to the city register by resolution number 85–0324 on May 28, 1985, and is home to the U.S. Post Office and several federal government agencies.
- Daguhoy Lodge #528, 203 East Hazelton Avenue. The most recent addition to the city register, the building was added by resolution number 03–0104 on March 4, 2003.
- Elks Building, 42 N. Sutter St. Constructed in the Chicago style (1900–24) by Salfield & Kohlberg, this five-story structure was built in 1908. It featured a huge stained glass dome skylight, which was originally intended for the San Francisco Elks Hall but diverted to Stockton after the 1906 earthquake. The Benevolent Protective Order of Elks met on the top floor until 1976, after which the dome water later removed and sold. The upper floors sustained fire damage in 1980, but the lobby still contains the original mosaic floor that has an Elks motif. The building is #80004606 on the National Register of Historic Places and was added on June 3, 1980.

== See also ==
- Oldest Jewish Cemetery
