= Locke's Meat Market =

Historic building in Lockeford, California, USA

- U.S. National Register of Historic Places
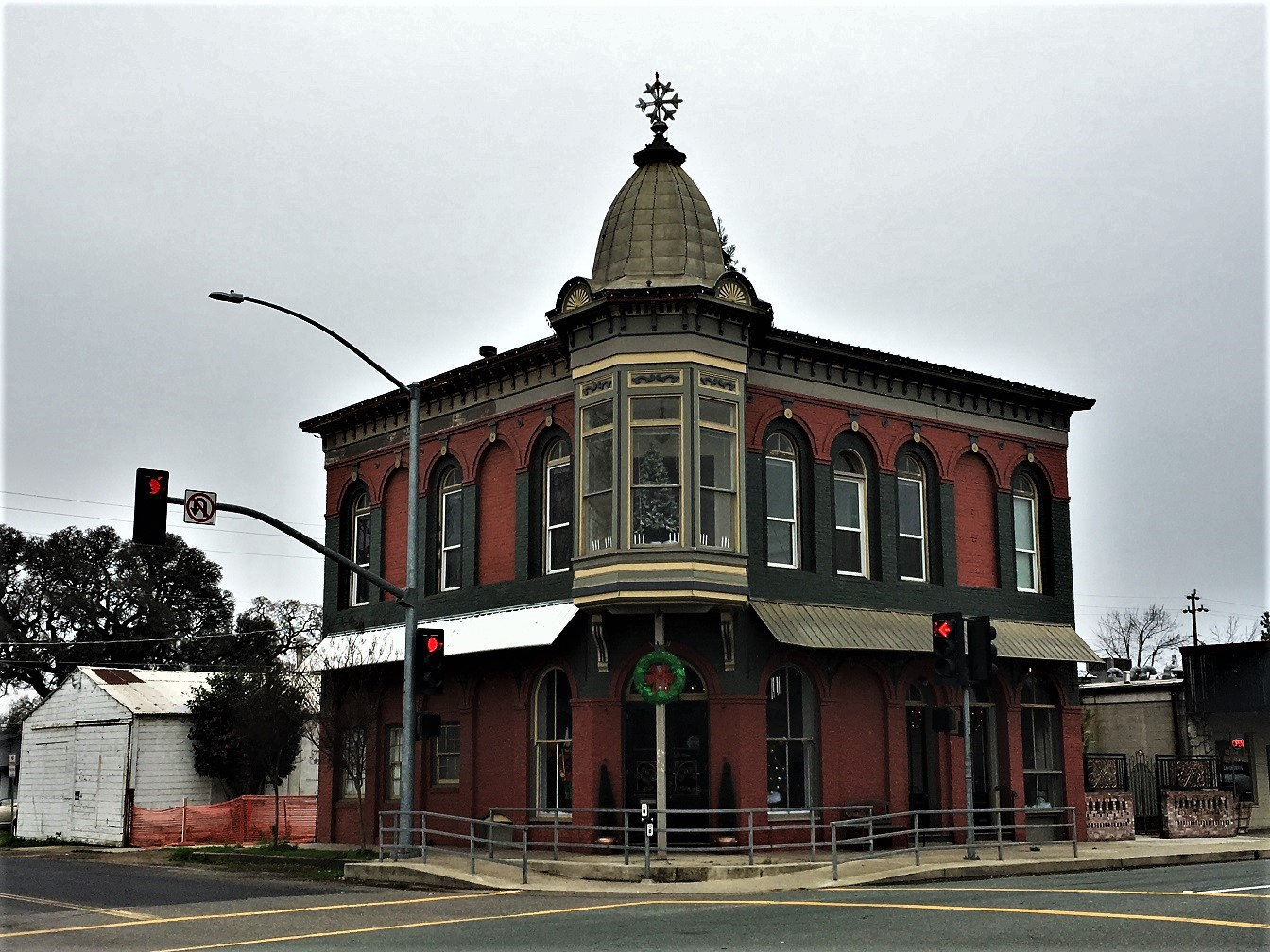
- Locke's Meat Market

- Location within Northern California
- Location: 13480 CA 88, Lockeford, California
- Coordinates: 38°09′48″N 121°08′57″W
- Area: 0.4 acres (0.16 ha)
- Built: 1883
- Architect: Beasley, Charles
- Architectural style: Early Commercial
- NRHP reference No.: 82002253
- Added to NRHP: February 19, 1982

Locke's Meat Market, also known as Luther Locke Butcher Shop and the Locke Building, is a vacant commercial building in Lockeford, California. Built in 1883, Locke's Meat Market was added to the National Register of Historic Places in 1982.

== History ==
Locke's Meat Market is a two-story brick building with a five-bayed oriel window over the entrance. The ground floor functioned as a meat market and the second floor provided living space.

Luther Locke, son of Dean Jewett Locke who was one of the founders of Lockeford, ran the meat market. His wife, Alice, opened a dressmaking shop in the downstairs space as well, while the family lived upstairs.

In 1939, the building was sold and the first floor space was repurposed as a barbershop.
