= Philomath (disambiguation) =

A philomath is a person with a love of learning.

Philomath may also refer to:

== People ==
- Benjamin Franklin, who used this pen-name
- Jonathan Swift, who wrote as T. N. Philomath

== Literature ==
- Philomathes, a character in a dissertation by King James VI and I titled Daemonologie
- Philomathes, a main character in the theatrical comic interlude Studentes (1545/49) by Christoph Stymmelius

== Organisations ==
- Philomath Club, Jewish women's literary association in San Francisco, California, founded in 1894
- Philomathean Club, women's club in Stockton, California, founded in 1896
- Philomathean Literary Society (Erskine College)
- Philomathean Society, literary society at the University of Pennsylvania, founded in 1813
- Philomathean Society (New York University) (1832-1888)
- Philomaths, Polish secret student organization that existed, 1817-23, at the Imperial University of Vilnius

== Places and schools ==
- Philomathean Clubhouse, historic building of the women's club in Stockton, California
- Philomath, Georgia
- Philomath, Indiana
- Philomath, Oregon, home of:
  - Philomath High School
  - Philomath School District
