= Moses Rodgers =

American mining engineer

Moses Logan Rodgers
- Born: 1835 (?); Missouri, U.S.
- Died: October 22, 1900 (aged 64–65); Stockton, California, U.S.
- Occupations: Mining engineer, Metallurgist

Moses Logan Rodgers (c. 1835–October 22, 1900) was an African American pioneer of California, arriving in 1849, during the California Gold Rush.

== Biography ==
Five main shafts and over 10,000 feet of underground workings brought the gold/silver ore to the surface where it was handsorted and then sent by wagon to the mine's concentration mill. A Merced newspaper said of Rodgers that "there is no better mining man in the State."

== Legacy ==
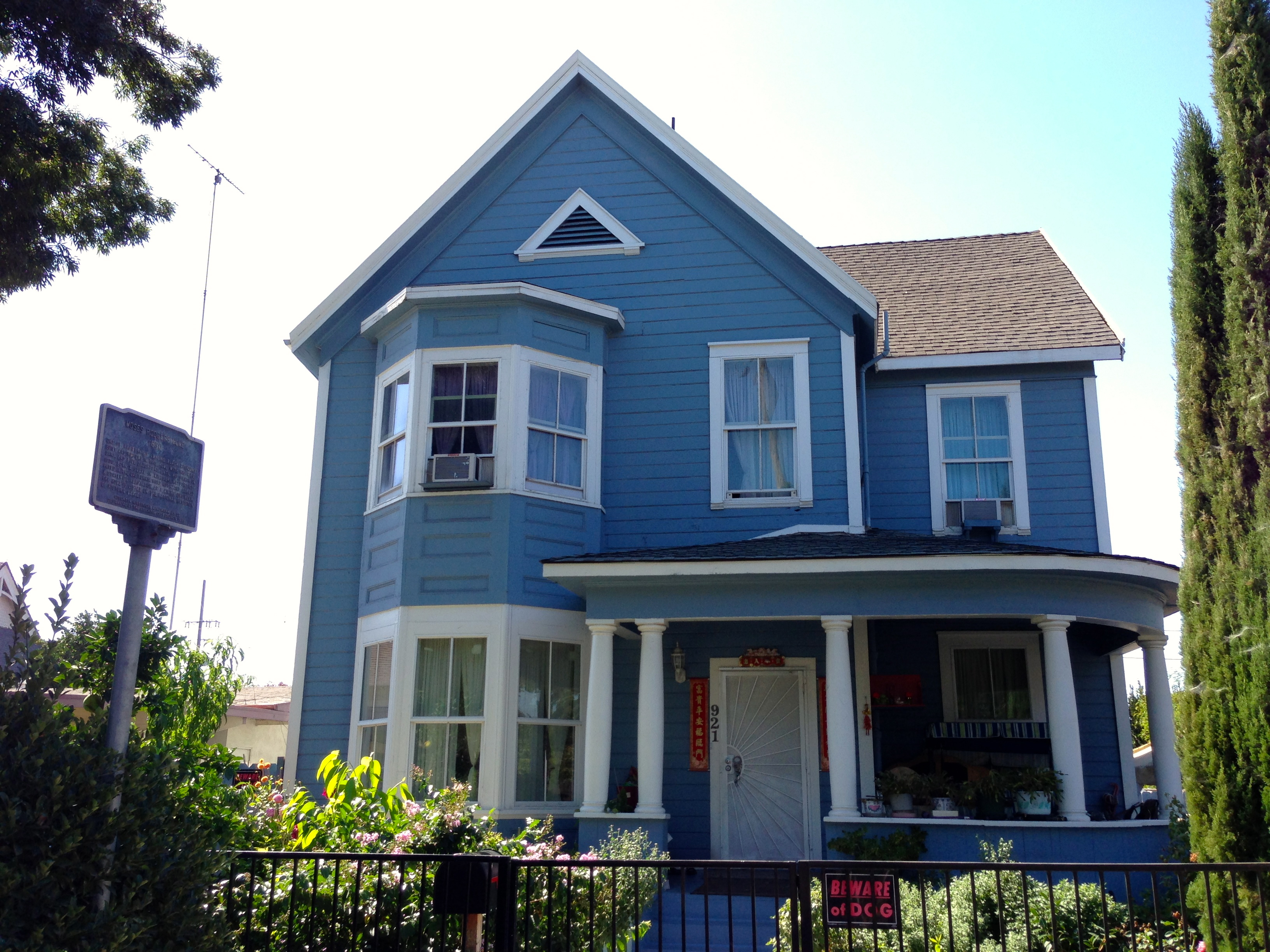
Moses Rodgers House (1898)

- The Moses Rodgers House which Rodgers built in 1898 at 921 South San Joaquin Street, Stockton, California is a historical landmark which is registered at The National Register of Historic Places. He built it for his wife Sarah and their five daughters, to all of whom he gave the very best education California afforded. One daughter Vivian Rodgers graduated from the University of California, Berkeley, with the class of 1909 majoring in Science and Letters.
- Moses Rodgers Virtual Academy, 302 W. Weber Avenue, Stockton,
