= Dean Jewett Locke =

Dean Jewett Locke (1823–1887) was the founder of the pioneer town, Lockeford, California. As a student of the Harvard Medical School, he was a trained physician, but he contributed to the small community in many more professions. The house he lived in is now a historical landmark in California.

== Life ==
Dean Jewett Locke was born in New Hampshire in 1823. He left Harvard Medical School before graduation, to join the gold rush on a trip to California in search of gold. He traveled with the Boston-Newton Joint Stock Company as their physician. Realizing that it was more prosperous to own land, he and his brothers, George and Elmer, built a small ranch along the Mokelumne River in the San Joaquin Valley in 1851. He returned to the East to visit family in 1854, and it was there he met Delia Hammond. They married in 1855 and Dr. Dean and his new wife packed off to the ranch along with D.J. Locke’s father, Luther Locke, who later became the first postmaster of Lockeford.

The Locke ranch became a starting point for the town Lockeford. The home that Dr. Dean had been living in was rebuilt into a small frame house for his wife, which would later be known as the Locke House. He was a generous contributor to the community and the town of Lockeford. He constantly strove to make Lockeford a beacon of trade and prosperity in the West. Locke gave land for the sites of three churches and a school. Later on, additional property was signed off for the construction of a railroad depot, which he hoped would bring in trade and settlers, and make Lockeford a stopping point for two other railroads that were nearby, the San Joaquin Railroad and the Sierra-Nevada Railroad. Along with donations of land, D.J. Locke was very generous with his money. He purchased railroad cars and the constant competition with other nearby towns, such as Woodbridge and Lodi, drove him to purchase a steam boat in an attempt to make Lockeford an inland port.

At the end of his days, Locke, 64, was not only a physician and a rancher, he was also a store owner, a bridge operator, and the owner of a steam ship, until his ship, the Pert, ran aground. Dr. Dean Jewett Locke remained a generous contributor to the community of Lockeford until his death on May 4, 1887.

== Locke House ==
The Locke House began as a small log cabin that housed Dean Locke when he arrived in California but was soon remodeled when he brought his wife, Delia Hammond to live with him on his ranch. This little cabin in the San Joaquin Valley was transformed into a homey frame house. In 1865, it was once again remodeled into a three-story brick house, to contain the growing number of children. The house also had a barn. Other additions were eventually made, such as a water tower in 1881, and another two stories in 1882. With these additions, the house contained twenty-two rooms, and three stories. The house was built in the neo-Georgian style. The Locke House accommodated Locke, his wife, and their thirteen children. It could also house the occasional visitor, relative, or a patient of Dr. Locke’s. At the time of the Civil War, the barn was used by the Mokelumne Light Dragoons as headquarters. The Locke House was restored and renovated by previous owners, the Eklund family, who converted it to The Inn at Locke House. The Eklunds became the first proprietors and innkeepers of the inn.
