= Cooke 1913 Tractor Biplane =

1913 Tractor Biplane
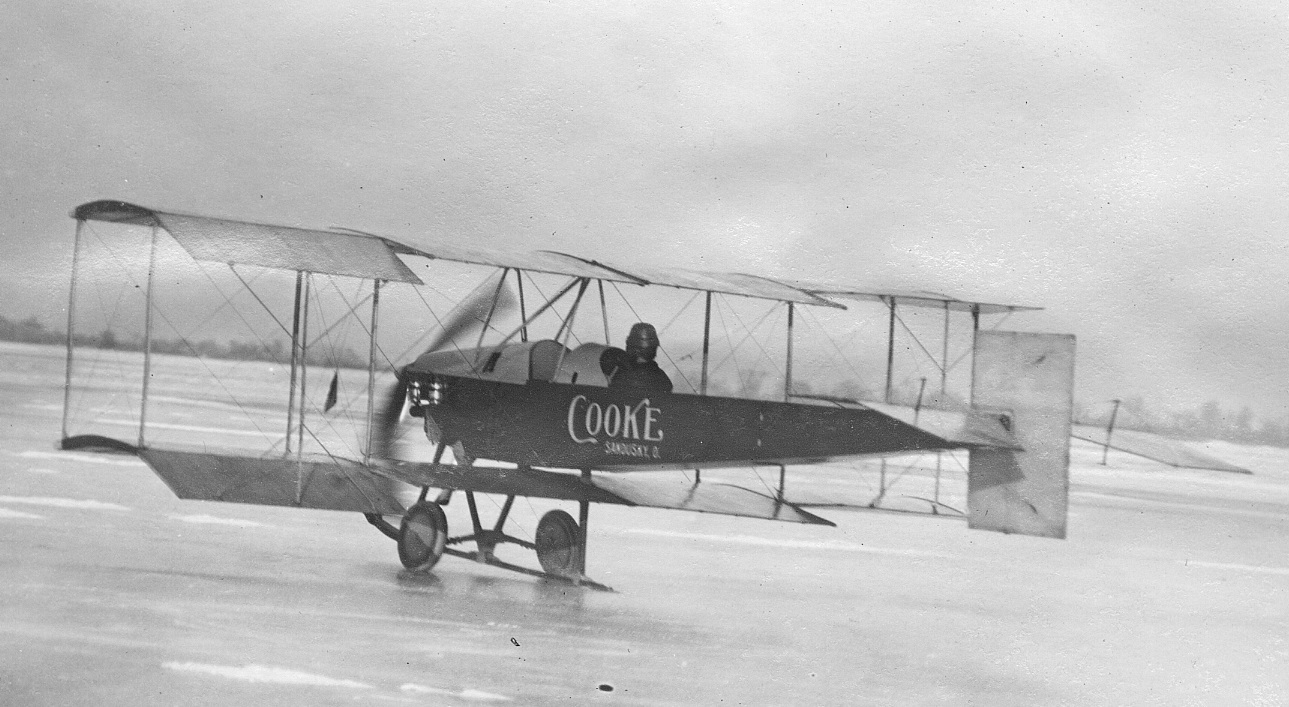
- Cooke biplane on a take off run on ice, Sandusky Bay,1913

General information
- Type: Exhibition flying and air racer
- National origin: United States
- Designer: Weldon B. Cooke
- Number built: 1

History
- First flight: 1913

The Cooke 1913 Tractor Biplane was an experimental tandem biplane aircraft built by the Cooke Aeroplane Company in 1913.

== Design and development ==
Weldon B. Cooke designed and built this aircraft in the winter of 1912-1913. Cooke, who was a well known exhibition pilot, designed this aircraft with racing and exhibition flying in mind.

Cooke designed the aircraft for a 75 mph (121 km/h) top speed. For the time it was designed, it was a very modern aircraft, incorporating features that wouldn't become commonplace on aircraft until towards the end of the Great War. The layout of the aircraft itself, a tandem two seat biplane with a tractor motor, was very unusual in 1912. Most of the aircraft being built and flying in North America at the time being some variation of a Curtiss type pusher biplane where the pilot and passengers would sit exposed in front of the leading edge of the lower wing.

Another unusual feature of the aircraft was the inverted installation of the Roberts inline 6 cylinder engine. When the early direct drive inline motors were mounted upright in a tractor installation, the cylinders would be almost completely exposed above fuselage deck. This type of mount would add aerodynamic drag to the aircraft, as well as presenting a substantial visual barrier for the pilot. By inverting the motor, the engine could be contained within the fuselage profile and the pilot had an unobstructed forward view. This may have been the first recorded inverted motor installation in an aircraft. By the late 1920s, this type of installation was commonplace, as best exemplified by the iconic de Havilland DH.60G-III Moth Major.

Because of the inability of period aircraft to be able to fly to and from the exhibition, the logistics of flying in the 1910s involved shipping the aircraft by train from one event to the next. To facilitate this, Cooke designed the aircraft to be quick and easy to take apart and re-assemble. The wings, which have a span of 24 feet, are made up of four detachable six foot sections. The fuselage is built in three detachable sections. The front section contains the engine and the passenger's seat with all controls and their connections. The second section contains the pilot's seat and the third, the tail. The skin of the fuselage was made up of a thin ply veneer to give it additional stiffness.

== Specifications ==
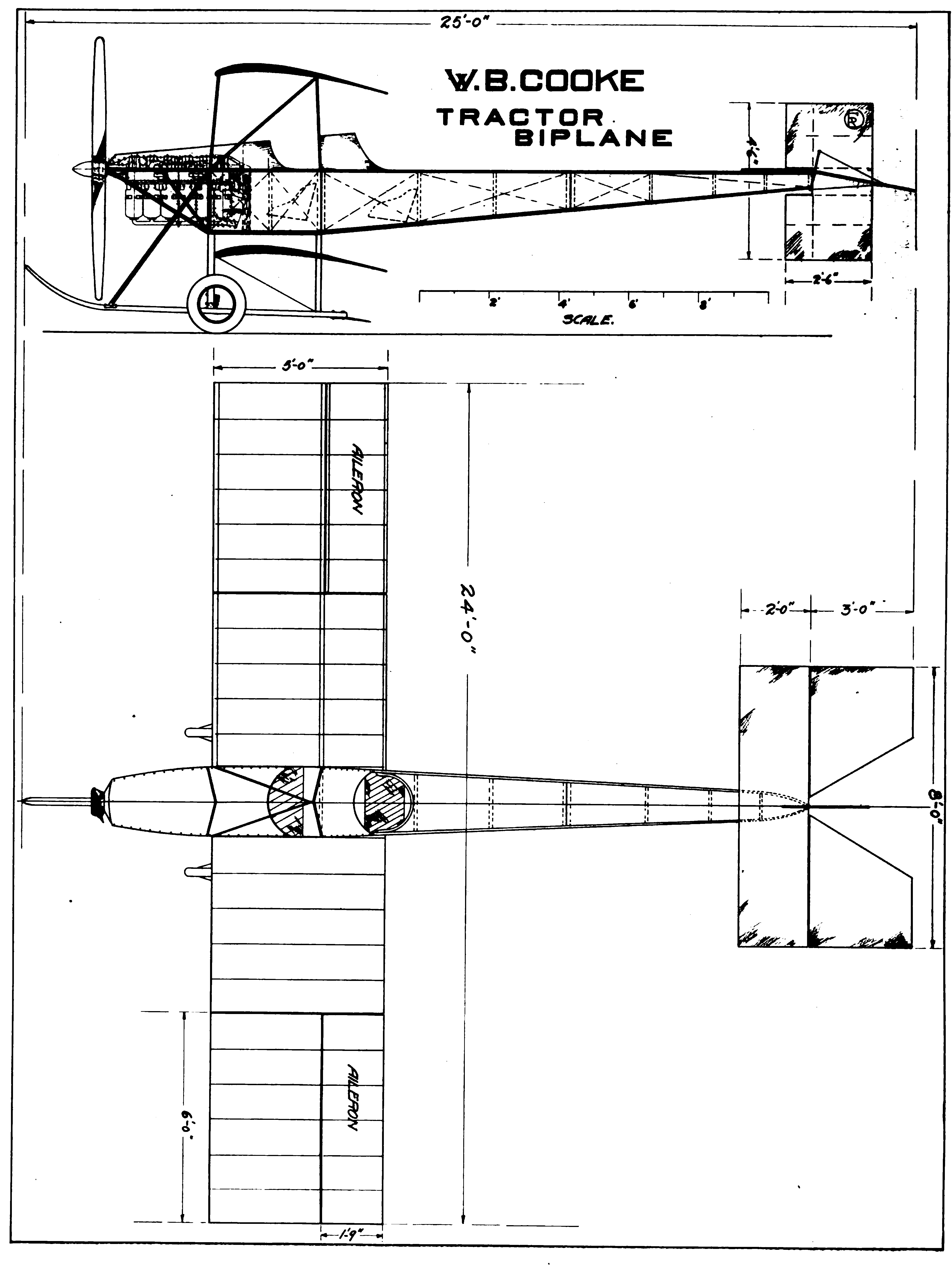
Cooke Tractor biplane 2 view drawing - Aero and Hydro volume 1 pg 364

General characteristics

- Length: 25 ft (7.6 m)
- Wingspan: 24 ft (7.3 m)
- Powerplant: 1 × Roberts two-stroke inverted inline 6 cylinder, 75 hp (56 kW)
- Propellers: 2-bladed

Performance
