= Locke House and Barn =

- U.S. National Register of Historic Places
- Location within Northern California
- Location: 19960 W. Elliott Rd., Lockeford, California
- Coordinates: 38°09′53″N 121°08′59″W
- Area: 5 acres (2.0 ha)
- Built: 1862, 1881, 1882
- Built by: Locke, Dean Jewett
- Architectural style: Neo-Georgian
- NRHP reference No.: 72000252
- Added to NRHP: June 19, 1972

The Locke House and Barn is a home and outbuilding in Lockeford, California that is now the Inn at Locke House. The house, built in 1862 with addition in 1882, the barn, built in 1882, and the water tower (f.k.a. tank-house), built in 1881, were the first structures to be listed on the National Register of Historic Places in San Joaquin County, California when the property was added to the National Register in 1972.

== History ==
The two-story brick home was built in 1862 by Dr. Dean Jewett Locke, one of the founders of Lockeford. A brick water tower was added in 1881 along with a two-story addition connecting the water tower to the house. The home had twenty-two rooms and housed the Locke family with thirteen children. The last surviving child of Dr. and Mrs. Locke lived in the home until her death in 1969.

The two-story barn was built of adobe and brick, and is approximately 60 by 40 feet (18 m × 12 m) in plan. The second floor of the barn served as a community meeting place for groups such as the Lockeford Good Templar Society, the Congregational Church, and the Ladies Home Library Association. During the American Civil War, it served as the armory of the Mokelumne Dragoons, the local (union) militia.
