= Harmony Grove Church =

- U.S. National Register of Historic Places
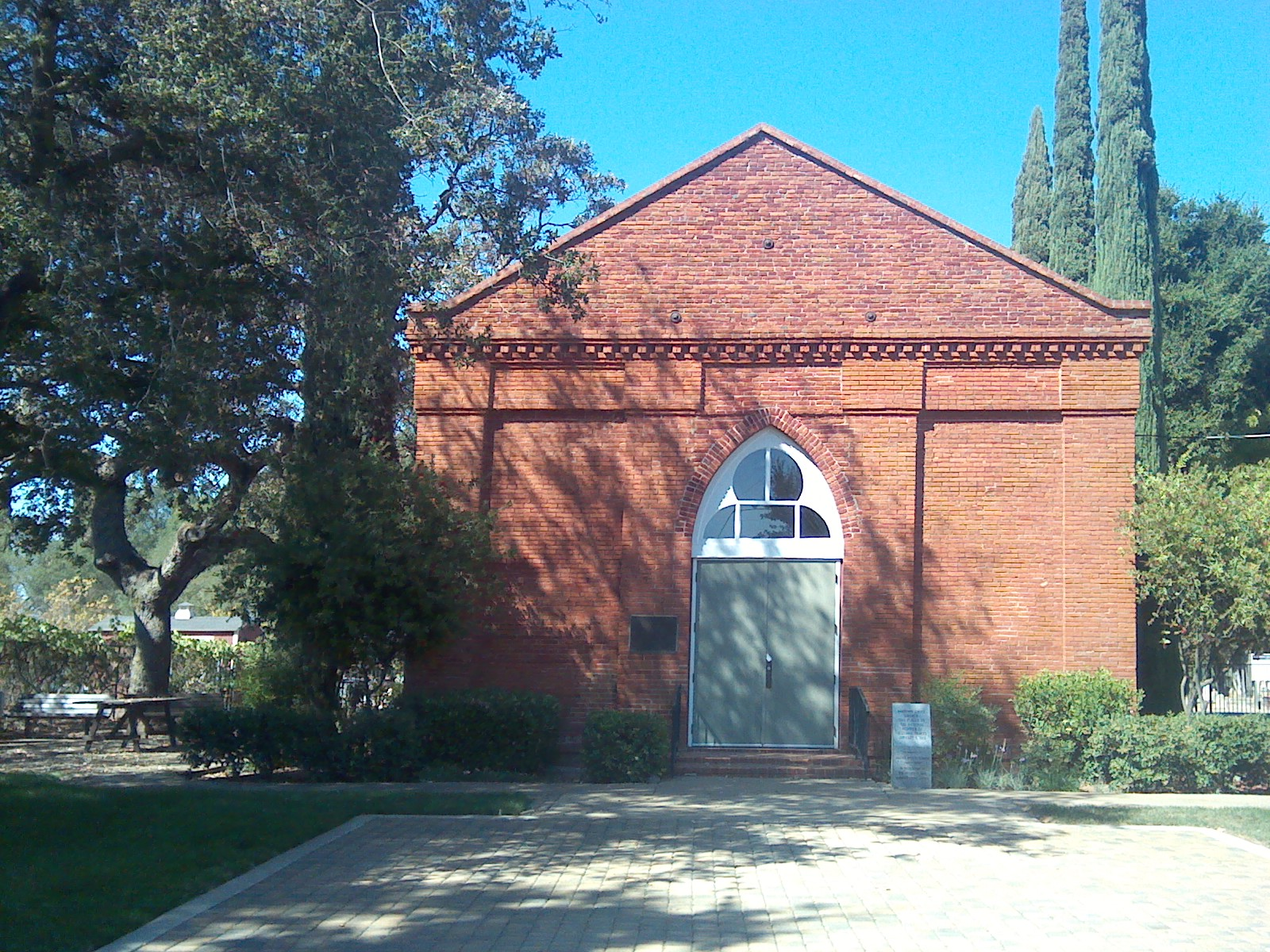
- Harmony Grove Church

- Location within Northern California
- Location: 11455 E Locke Rd, Lockeford, California
- Area: less than one acre
- Built: 1859
- Built by: Brakeman, John; Tallmadge, James
- Architectural style: Greek Revival, Gothic Revival
- NRHP reference No.: 10001103
- Added to NRHP: January 3, 2011

The Harmony Grove Church is a church in Lockeford, California. Built in 1859, it was added to the National Register of Historic Places in 2011.

== History ==
Harmony Grove Church is a rare surviving example of an early Protestant brick church in California's Central Valley. The single-story brick building originally had a flat roof, and was built in Greek Revival style in 1859. A brick pediment was added in 1868, contributing to a Gothic appearance. The 1868 remodeling also raised the roof by 9 feet and replaced the tarpaper with wood shingles.

The name "Harmony Grove" was inspired by New Harmony, Indiana, the hometown of one of the original church members. Intended to be a place of worship for the entire community, it instead became a Methodist church.

After 1918, the building served as a warehouse until it was purchased by Lloyd Dawson, a local developer, in 1965. Plans to demolish the building provoked resistance in the area, resulting in Dawson giving the building and nearly an acre of land to the San Joaquin County Board of Supervisors. The Lockeford-Clements Women's Club undertook renovation of the building, culminating in a rededication ceremony in 1973. A historical marker plaque was added in 1982. The church can be rented for small weddings.

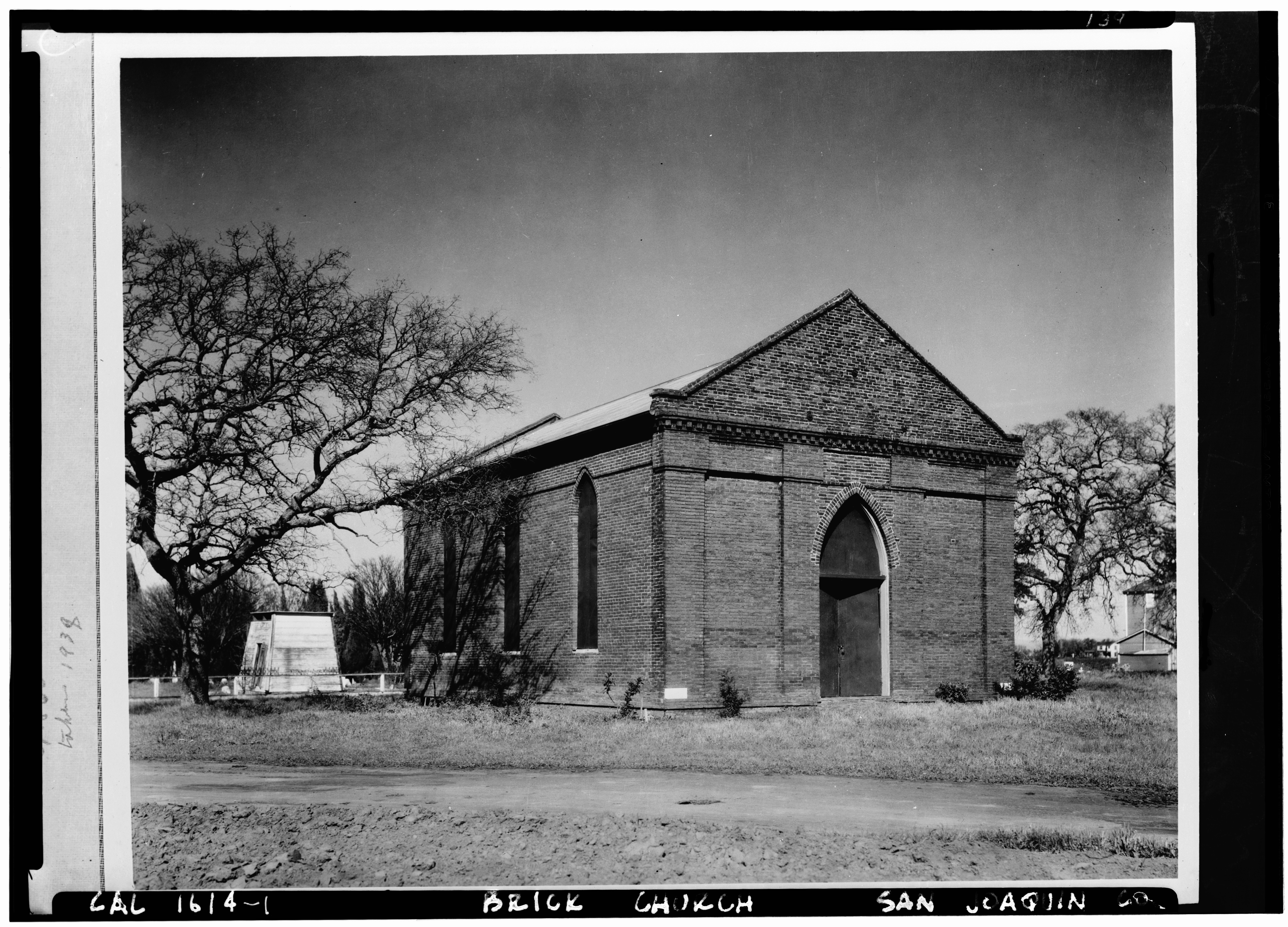
Harmony Grove Church

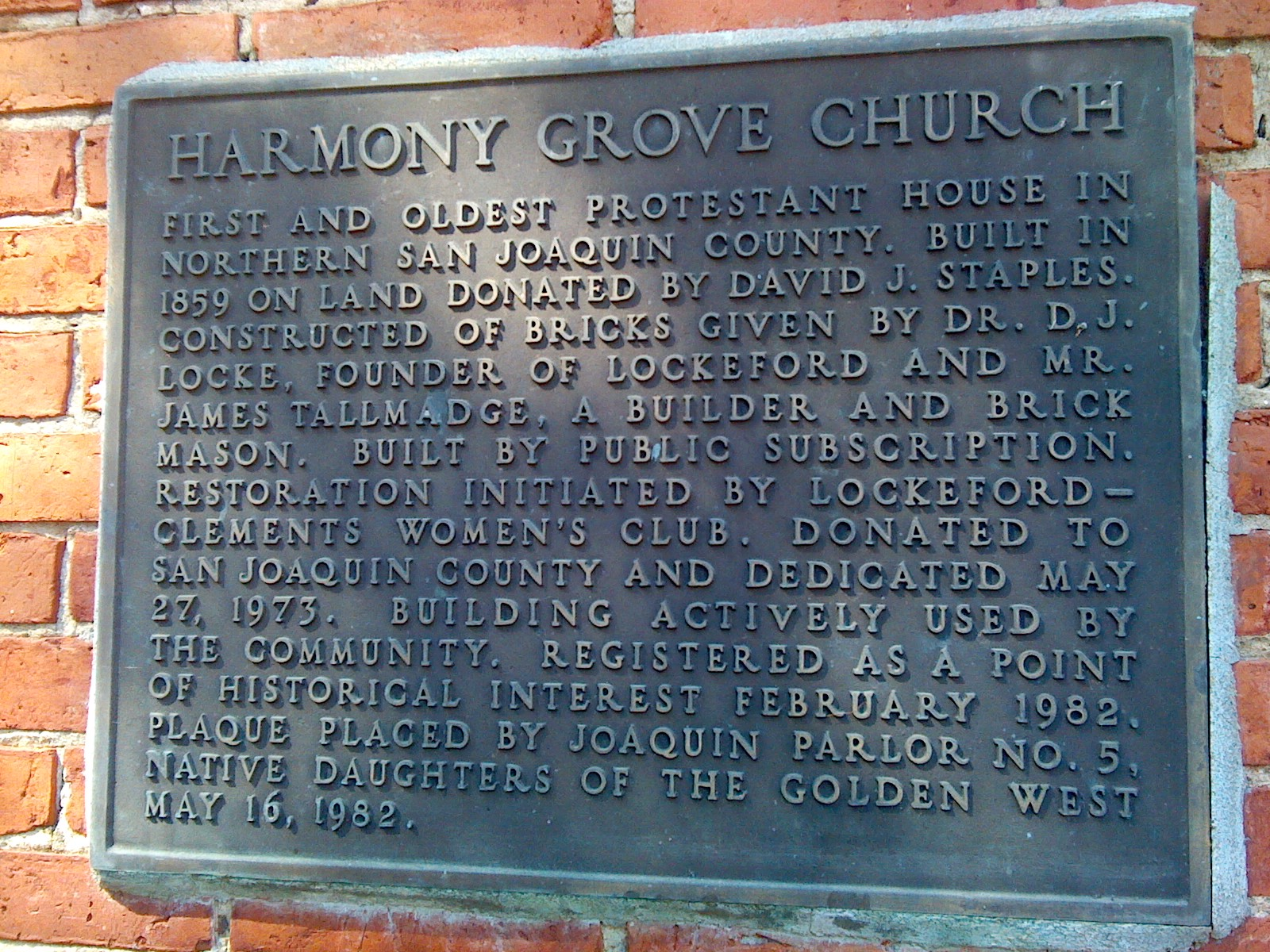
Dedication plaque, 1982
