= Weldon B. Cooke =

Pioneer aviator (1884–1914)

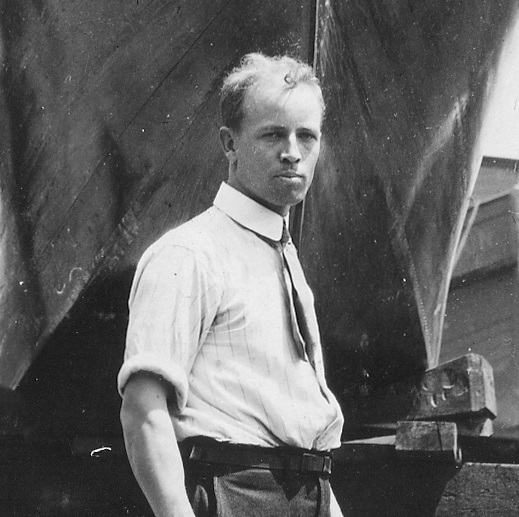
- Weldon Cooke, 1913
- Born: 28 June 1884; Oakland, California
- Died: September 16, 1914 (aged 30); Pueblo, Colorado

Weldon Bagster Cooke (28 June 1884 - September 16, 1914) was a pioneer aviator.

== Early life ==
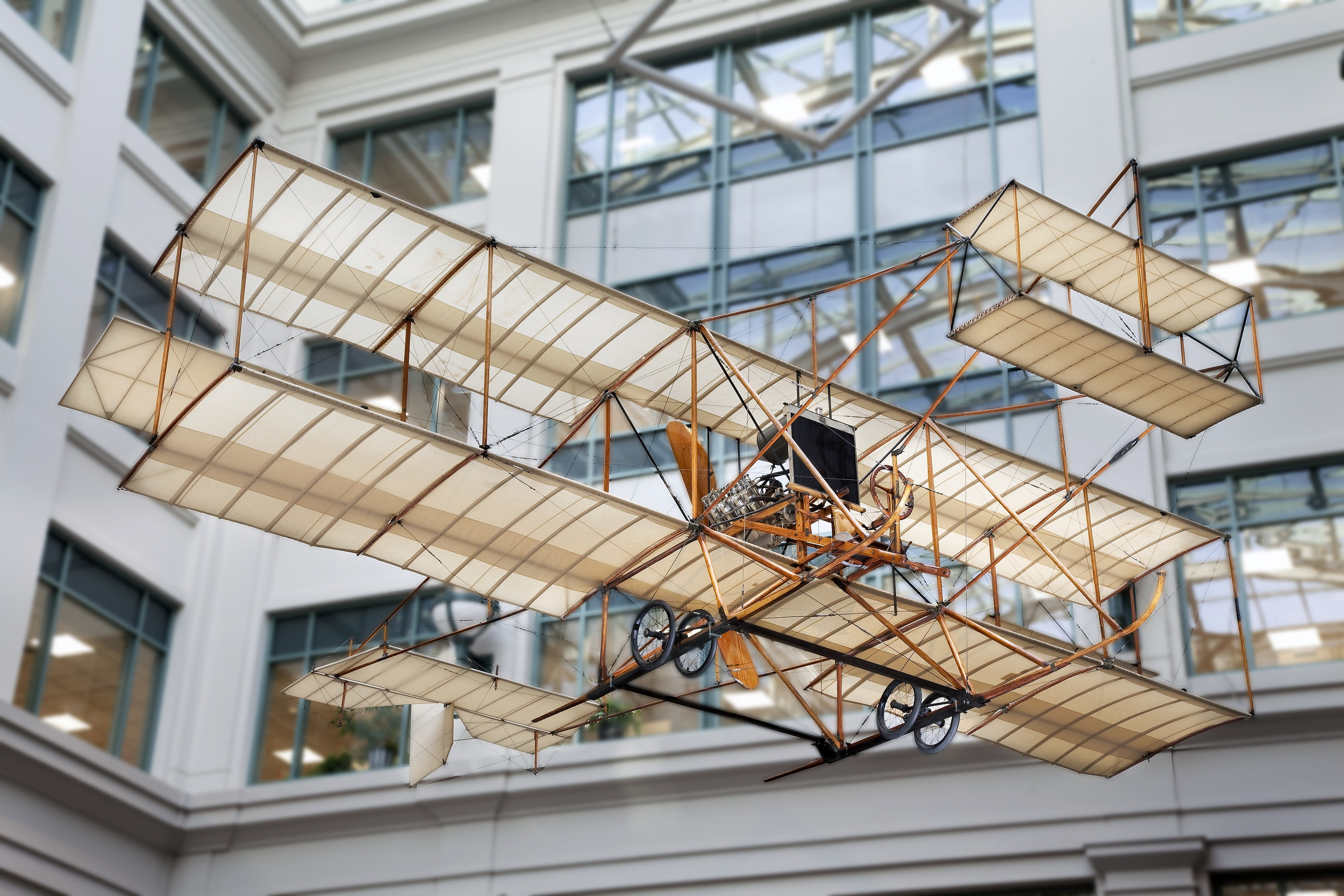
Wiseman-Cooke biplane mit 60-PS-Hall-Scott A-2-Motor (1912) National Air and Space Museum

He was born on June 28, 1884, in Oakland, California, to Ada L. and William H. Cooke. Cooke grew up in Lockeford, California. Cooke's grandfather, Dr. Dean Jewett Locke, was the founder of the town of Lockeford. Cooke attended the University of California where he graduated from the California School of Mechanical Arts and the College of Electrical Engineering. In 1910, Cooke was racing cars and living in Oakland.

== Aviation career ==
In 1910, Cooke built and flew a Montgomery-type glider. In 1911, barge captain Lan Maupin and shipyard owner Bernard Lanteri constructed a biplane of their design in Pittsburg, California, that they named Black Diamond after the nearby coal mines. In June 1911 Maupin and Lanteri took a few test hops in their aircraft and decided they needed a professional pilot and hired Cooke, even though Cooke had never flown a powered aircraft. Throughout the summer of 1911, Cooke practiced in the Black Diamond several times a day and made his exhibition flying debut at the Walnut Creek Grape Festival at Walnut Creek, California, on October 6–7, 1911. On December 19, 1911, Cooke was the first person to overfly Mount Tamalpais in Marin County, California, in the Black Diamond. The flight ended in Mill Valley, California, en route to Oakland after an engine failure and glide to landing from an altitude of 2,000 feet (610 meters).

In early 1912, Cooke passed his test for his pilot's license, which was presented to him by Oakland Mayor Frank K. Mott on January 13, 1912. He received Aero Club of America's pilot license # 95, making him the second licensed pilot in California.

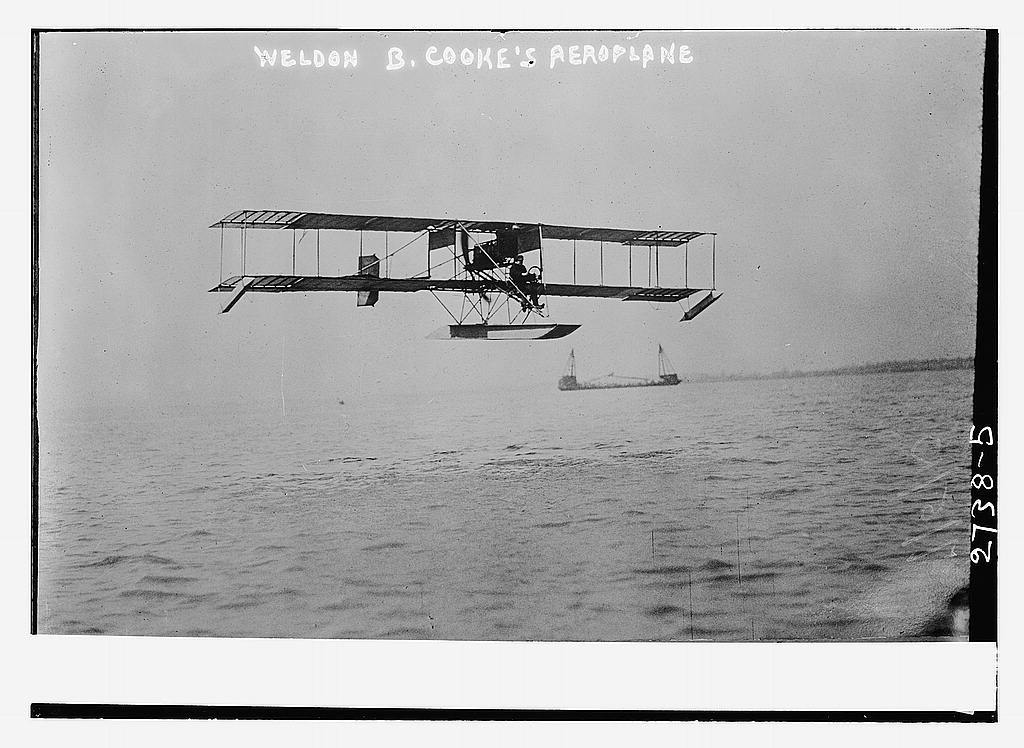
Cooke flying a floatplane on 6 July 1913

Cooke's Black Diamond exhibition flying culminated in its appearance in the January 1912 Los Angeles International air meet at Dominguez Field in Los Angeles, California. Cooke's flying was outstanding, setting the meet record for endurance and altitude, winning $7,400 in prizes. In 1911 and 1912, including the Los Angeles prize money, Cooke's flying earned Maupin and Lanteri's firm, now named the Diamond Airplane Company, a total of $14,800. The Los Angeles meet was the last flight of the Black Diamond. It was disassembled and put into storage, and in 1948 the Maupin family donated it to the Smithsonian Institution. In 1998, it was offered to the Hiller Aviation Museum, where it was restored and put on display.

At an exhibition on December 31, 1911–January 1, 1912, in Santa Rosa, California, Cooke took a test flight in a biplane that had been constructed by Fred J. Wiseman that Wiseman had used for the world's first air mail flight from Petaluma, California, to Santa Rosa. After the Los Angeles meet, Cooke no longer had an aircraft to fly, so he arranged to purchase the Wiseman biplane and had it crated up and sent to Emeryville, California, for an exhibition where he was to race Lincoln Beachy. Compared to Beachy's aircraft, the Wiseman biplane was underpowered and Beachy beat him easily in all five days of the event. To improve the performance, Cooke replaced the 60 hp (45 kW) Hall-Scott A-2 with a 75 hp (56 kW) Roberts two-stroke motor. Cooke continued to modify this aircraft as he used it for exhibition flying across the United States during 1912. The modified aircraft became known as the "Wiseman-Cooke Biplane." This aircraft became the second Cooke-piloted aircraft donated to the Smithsonian, where it was restored and put on display at the National Postal Museum. By late 1912, Cooke had arrived in Sandusky, Ohio, where he formed the Cooke Aeroplane Company to build aircraft of his own design. The Roberts Motor Company let him use a portion of their facility to work on his aircraft. When Cooke participated in the 1913 Great Lakes Reliability Cruise his address was listed as Sandusky.

In May 1914, Cooke was back in the San Francisco Bay Area, where he was the pilot of Silas Christofferson's Aeromaid flying boat. Christofferson tried to start an aerial ferry service between Oakland and San Francisco, California, but gave up after just a few flights.

Cooke died on September 16, 1914, in an air crash in Pueblo, Colorado.

== Aircraft ==
- Wiseman-Cooke 1912 Biplane
- Cooke 1913 Flying Boat
- Cooke 1913 Tractor Biplane
