= Woman's Club of Lodi =

- U.S. National Register of Historic Places
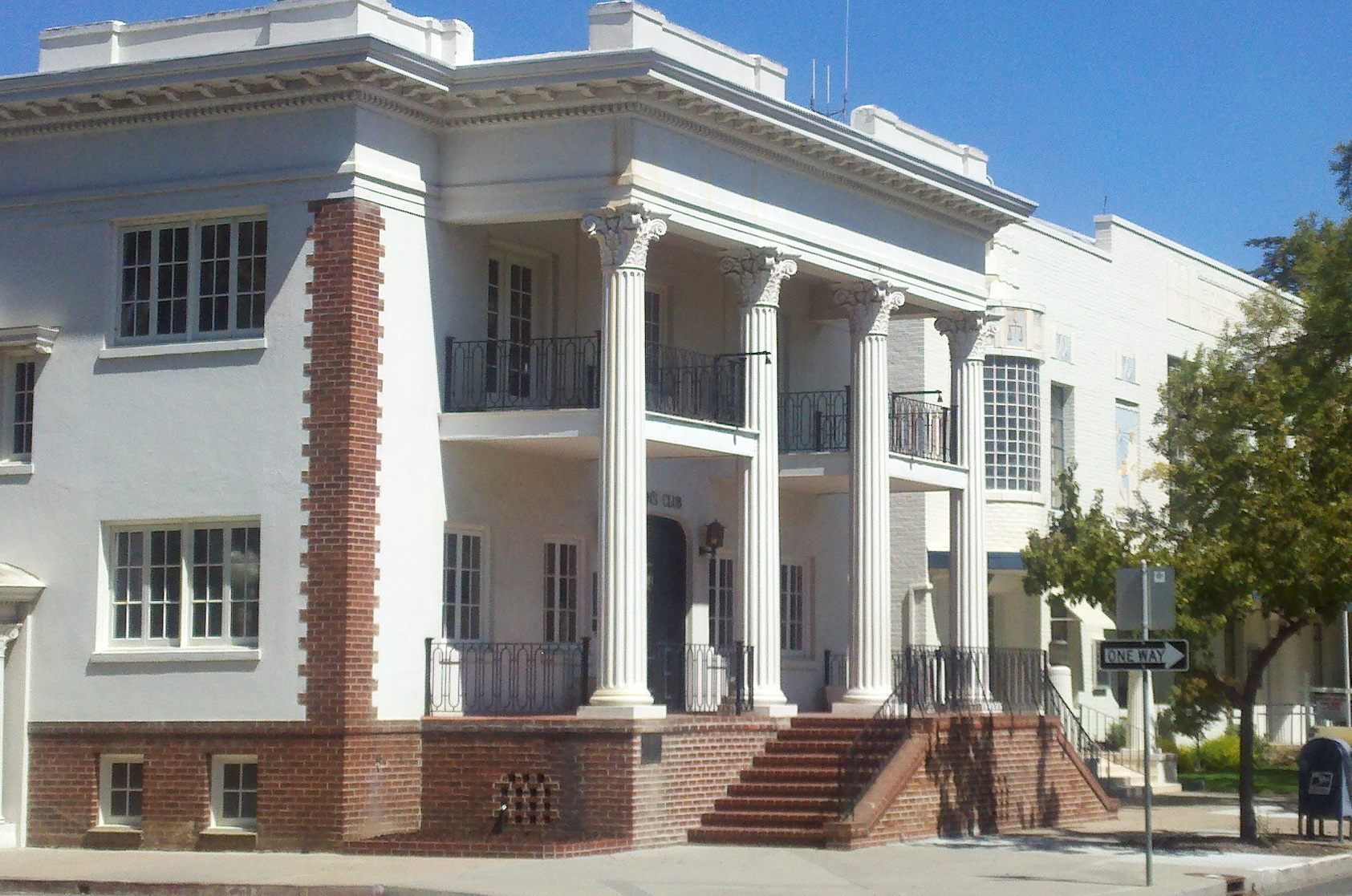

- Location within California Location within the United States
- Location: 325 W. Pine St., Lodi, California
- Coordinates: 38°8′5″N 121°16′34″W
- Area: less than one acre
- Built: 1923
- Architect: Morrell, Ralph P.
- Architectural style: Classical Revival
- NRHP reference No.: 88000555
- Added to NRHP: May 20, 1988

The Woman's Club of Lodi is a historic building located at 325 W. Pine St. in Lodi, California. The building was constructed in 1923 to house the city's Woman's Club, which was formed in 1906 as a civic improvement group. The building housed performances and social events in Lodi; as the largest civic auditorium in the city, it served as the only building which could host social functions during the 1920s. Community events continue to be held in the building through the present day.

The Woman's Club of Lodi is designed in the Neoclassical style. The front entrance has a portico with four tall Corinthian columns topped with a pediment, all typical elements of Neoclassicism. However, the building's design also incorporated "feminine" elements such as flower-patterned light fixtures and tile in the interior and southern exposure to sunlight in several rooms. In its National Register of Historic Places nomination, the building was called an "architectural landmark" and "the most attractive of [Lodi's] major structures".

The Woman's Club of Lodi was added to the National Register of Historic Places on May 20, 1988.

== See also ==
- Clubhouses in California
- List of women's club buildings
- National Register of Historic Places listings in San Joaquin County, California
