= Woodbridge Masonic Lodge No. 131 =

- U.S. National Register of Historic Places
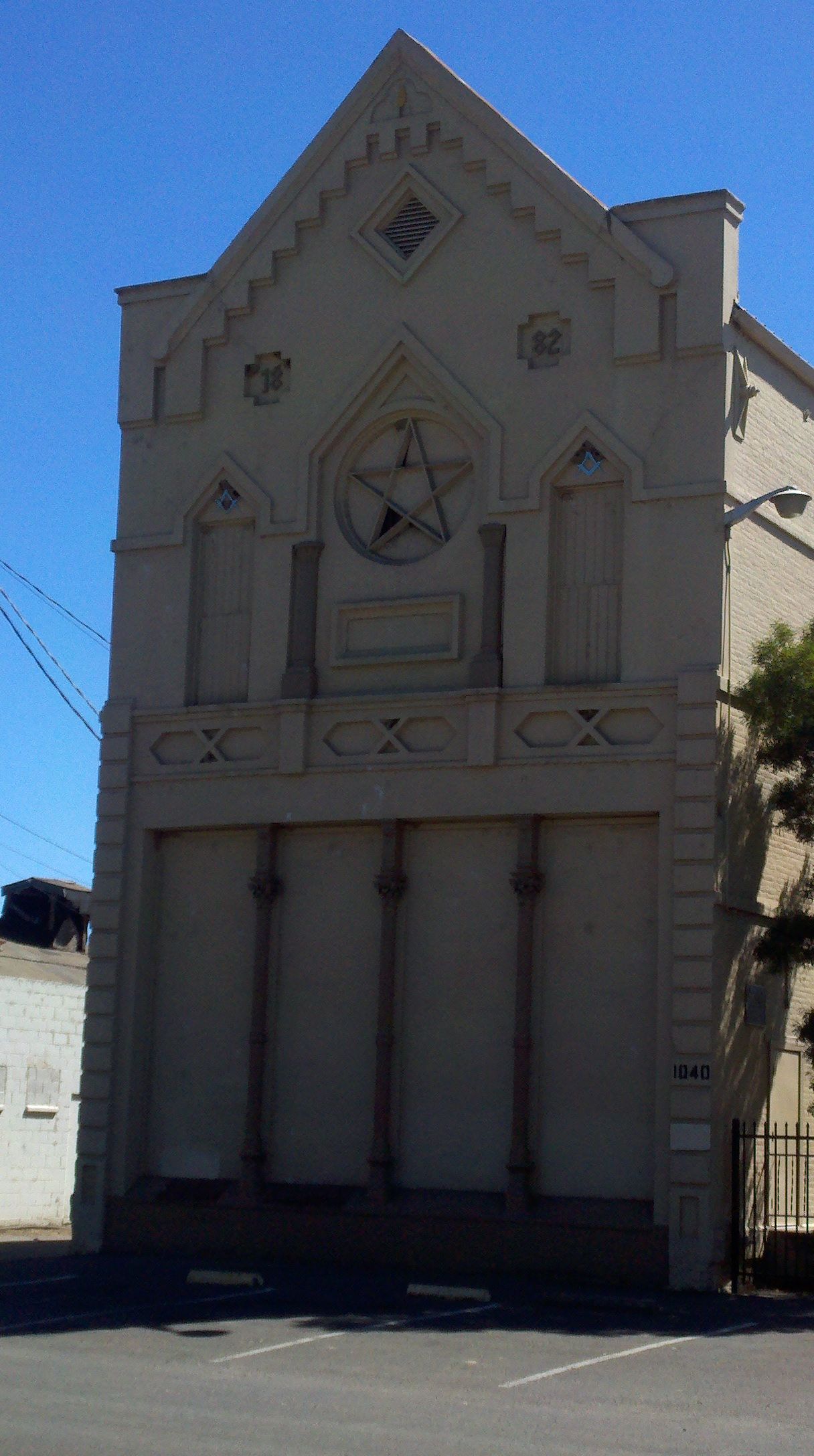

- Location within California Location within the United States
- Location: 1040 Augusta St., Woodbridge, California
- Coordinates: 38°9′14″N 121°18′3″W
- Area: 0.1 acres (0.040 ha)
- Built: 1882
- Architect: Beasley, Charles
- Architectural style: Gothic
- Website: https://www.woodbridgemasons.com
- NRHP reference No.: 89000318
- Added to NRHP: April 20, 1989

The Woodbridge Masonic Lodge No. 131 is a historic building located in Woodbridge, California. The building was designed by architect Charles Beasley and was built in 1882 to serve as a meeting hall for Woodbridge Lodge No. 131, a local chapter of the Freemasons.

The building was listed on the National Register of Historic Places in 1989. The building was described in its NRHP nomination as "a unique example of the nineteenth century Gothic Revival style...expressed in a very controlled and geometric [way]."
