= John Ohm House =

Historic house in California, United States

- U.S. National Register of Historic Places
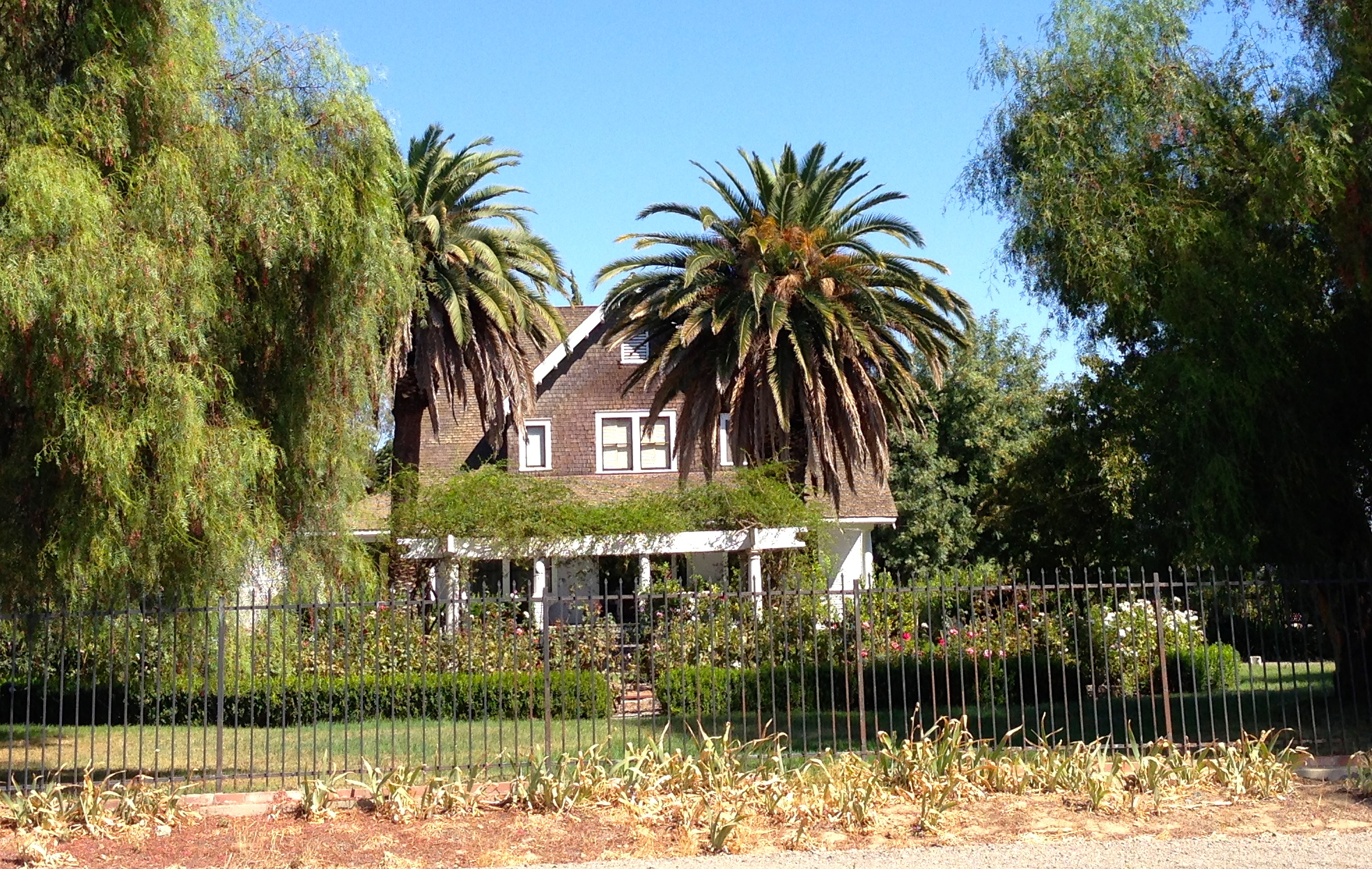

- Location within California Location within the United States
- Location: 31524 S. Kasson Rd.
- Nearest city: Tracy, California
- Coordinates: 37°40′4″N 121°15′39″W
- Area: 4.5 acres (1.8 ha)
- Built: 1908
- Architectural style: Bungalow
- NRHP reference No.: 82002256
- Added to NRHP: February 4, 1982

The John Ohm House is a house located at the site of San Joaquin City, 6 miles (9.7 km) southeast of Tracy, California. The large bungalow was built by John Ohm, a prominent rancher in the San Joaquin Valley, in 1908. Ohm and his family lived in the house, which was also the main building of a 4 acres (1.6 ha) ranch. At the time, San Joaquin City was a major port on the San Joaquin River and an important center for regional commerce. In 1911, however, a new channel in the river bypassed San Joaquin City, and the city rapidly declined; most of its buildings were demolished after World War I. The Ohm House is one of the few surviving buildings from the city.

The John Ohm House was added to the National Register of Historic Places on February 4, 1982.
