= Tracy City Hall and Jail =

Historic building in Tracy, California, USA

- U.S. National Register of Historic Places
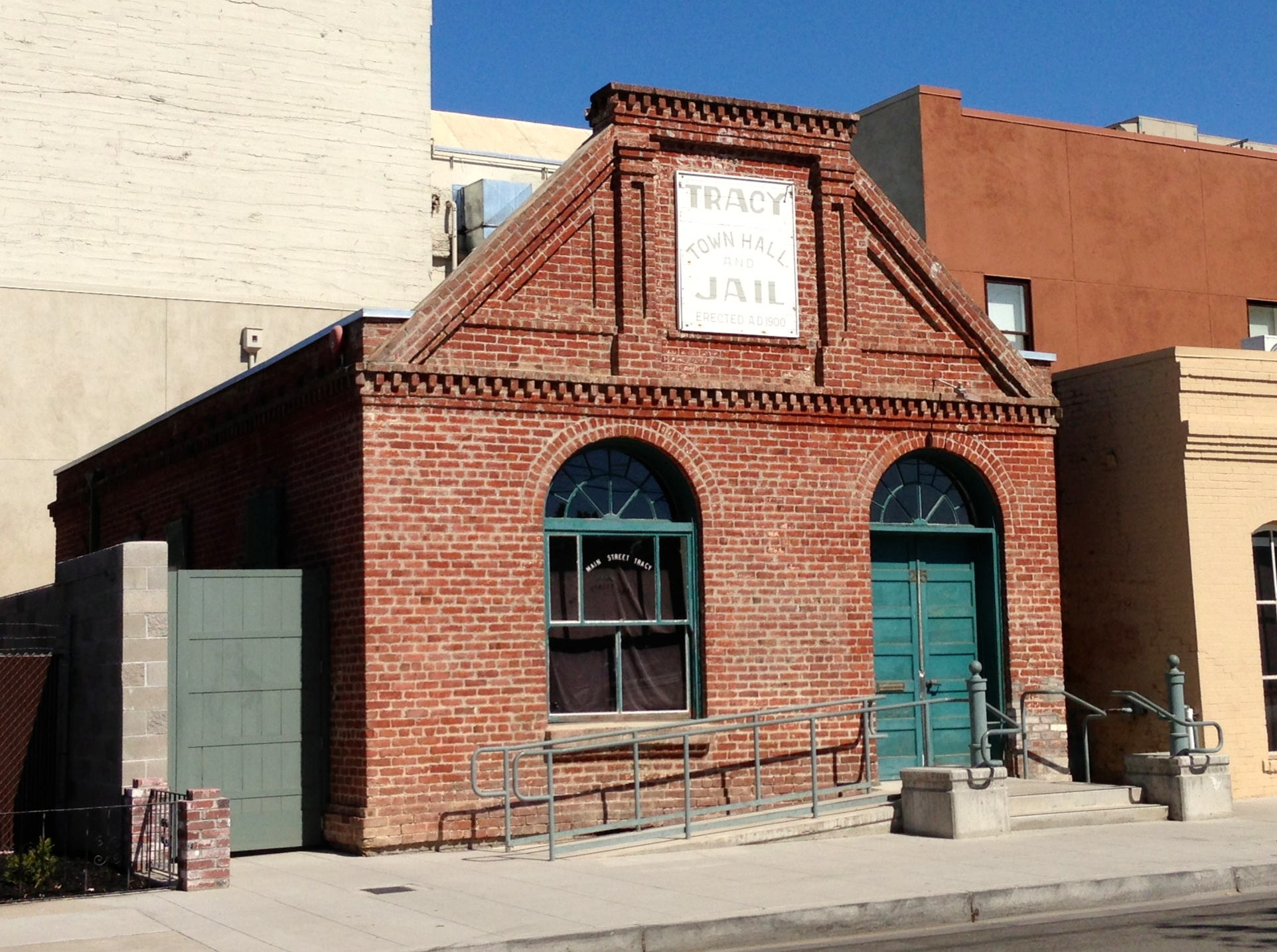
- Tracy City Hall and Jail

- Location within Northern California
- Location: 25 W. 7th St., Tracy, California
- Coordinates: 37°44′09″N 121°25′31″W
- Area: 0.1 acres (0.040 ha)
- Built: 1899
- Built by: J. F. Hoerl
- Architect: Beasley & Sons
- Architectural style: Bungalow/craftsman
- NRHP reference No.: 79000542
- Added to NRHP: October 18, 1979

The Tracy City Hall and Jail, also known as Old Tracy Jail, is a commercial structure in Tracy, California. Built in 1899, it was added to the National Register of Historic Places in 1979.

== History ==
When the city hall and jail was built, Tracy had not yet incorporated as a city and had no organized government of its own, being managed by San Joaquin County officials. San Joaquin County commissioned the building after the previous jail burned down.

The city hall and jail is a one-story brick building and is approximately 24 by 43 feet (7.3 m × 13.1 m). The architects' design of the façade of the building was based on San Francesco di Rimini, a fifteenth century church in northern Italy.

In later years, the building housed a local chapter of the Veterans of Foreign Wars. It is now in use as the office for The Grand Foundation.
