= El Dorado Elementary School =

Historic building in Stockton, California

- U.S. National Register of Historic Places
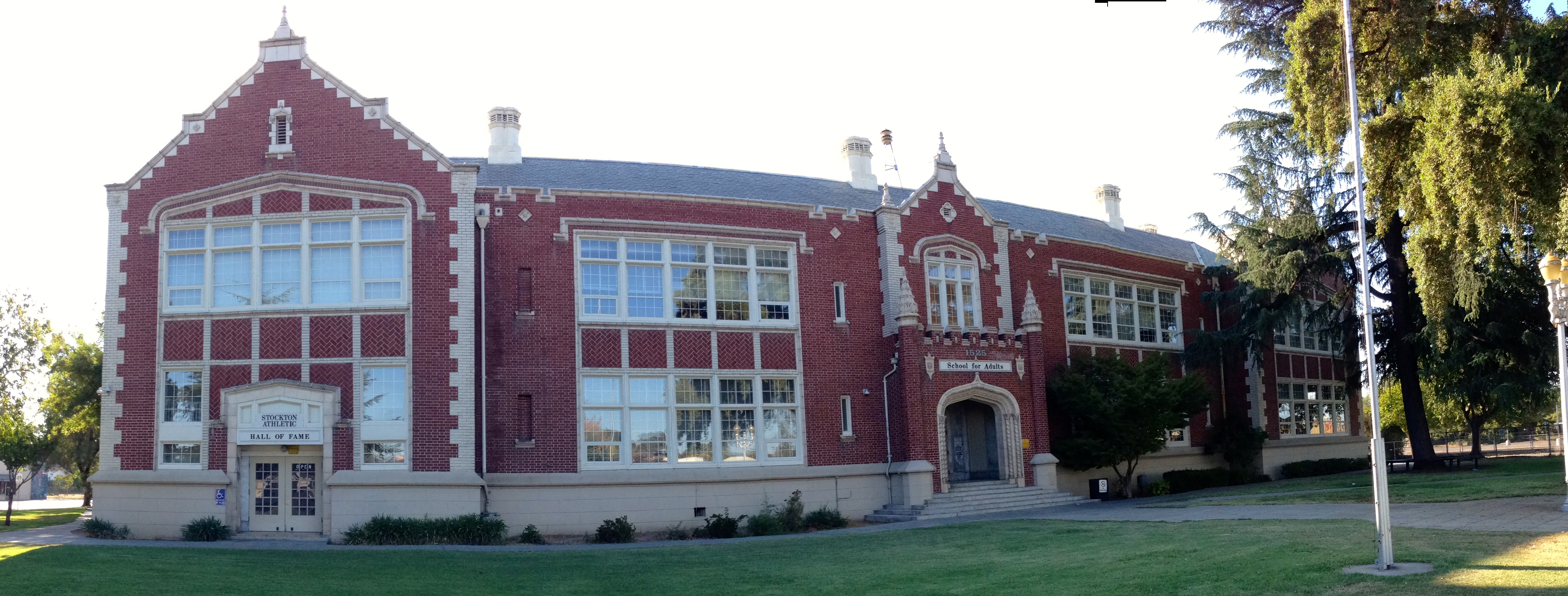
- El Dorado Elementary School

- Location within Northern California
- Location: Harding Way and Pacific Ave., Stockton, California
- Coordinates: 37°58′02″N 121°17′54″W
- Area: 2.6 acres (1.1 ha)
- Built: 1916
- Architect: William Wright.
- Architectural style: Tudor Revival, Elizabethean/Jacobethan
- NRHP reference No.: 77000335
- Added to NRHP: August 15, 1977

El Dorado Elementary School, now known as Stockton School for Adults, is a public school building in Stockton, California. Built in 1916, the building was added to the National Register of Historic Places in 1977. It was designated a Stockton Historic Landmark by resolution number 34,306 on July 11, 1977.

== History ==
El Dorado Elementary School is a two-story, brick, U-shaped structure. It was enlarged in 1922, by adding four classrooms to each wing. At a later, unknown date, the open court between the two wings was roofed over to provide a covered play area.

The state commission considered demolishing the El Dorado Elementary School building in 1976 due to concerns about earthquake safety, but chose to retain it.
