= Hotel Lodi =

Historic hotel in Lodi, California, US

- U.S. National Register of Historic Places
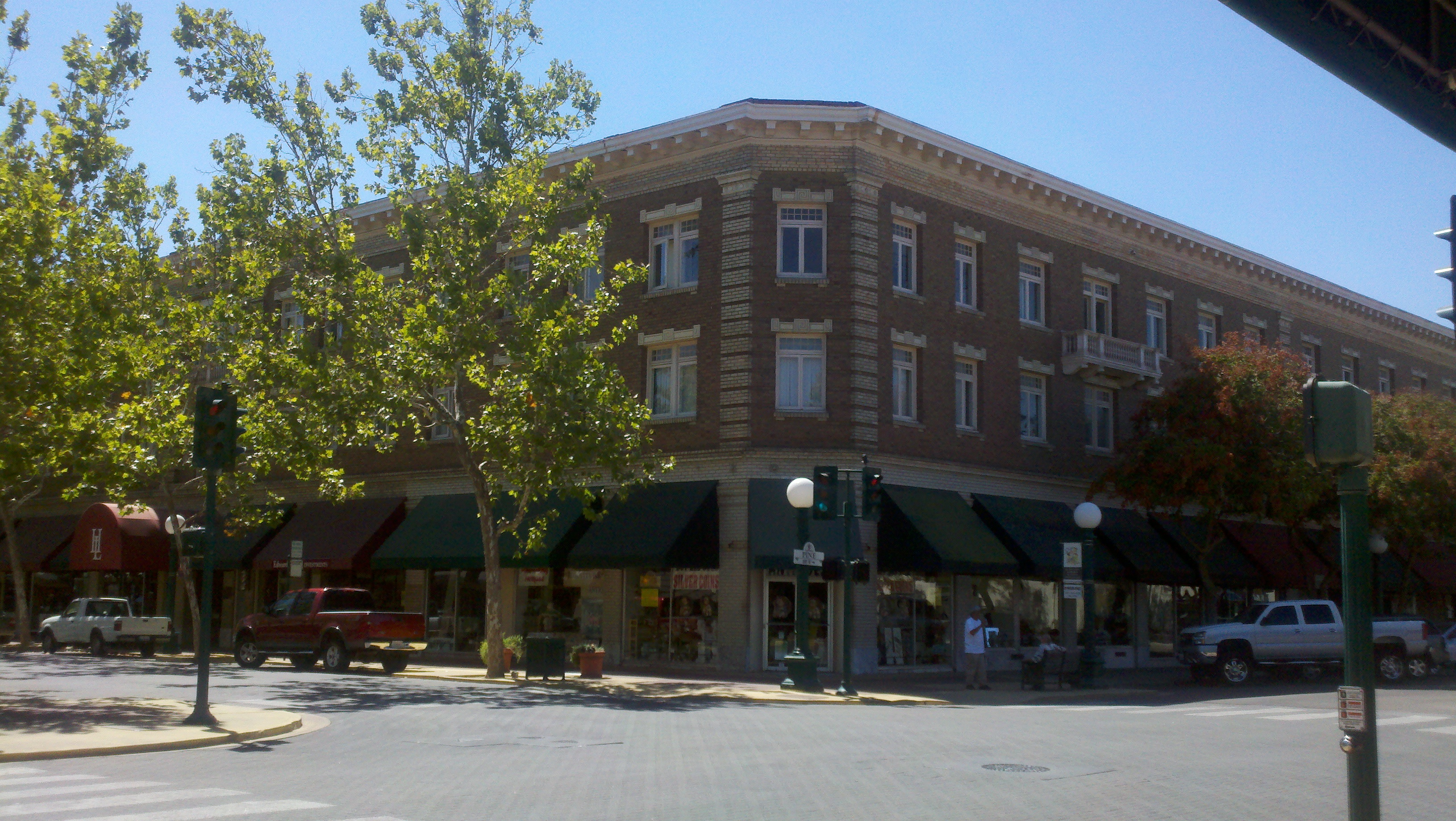

- Location within California Location within the United States
- Location: 5 S. School St., Lodi, California
- Coordinates: 38°8′2″N 121°16′24″W
- Area: less than one acre
- Built: 1915
- Architect: Morrell, Ralph P.
- Architectural style: Renaissance
- NRHP reference No.: 95001140
- Added to NRHP: September 29, 1995

The Hotel Lodi is a historic hotel located at 5 S. School St. in Lodi, California. Opened in 1915, the hotel was the largest and most significant hotel in northern San Joaquin County at the time. In addition to lodging, the hotel also hosted major social events, important business meetings, and large social club meetings. The hotel spurred growth in the city's hotel industry, and the presence of a large, modern hotel was credited with improving other areas of Lodi's economy as well. After the 1930s, the hotel began to decline, and by the late 1940s it no longer held its social and business functions. The hotel was later converted into a commercial building.

The Hotel Lodi was added to the National Register of Historic Places on September 29, 1995.
