= Tretheway Block =

- U.S. National Register of Historic Places
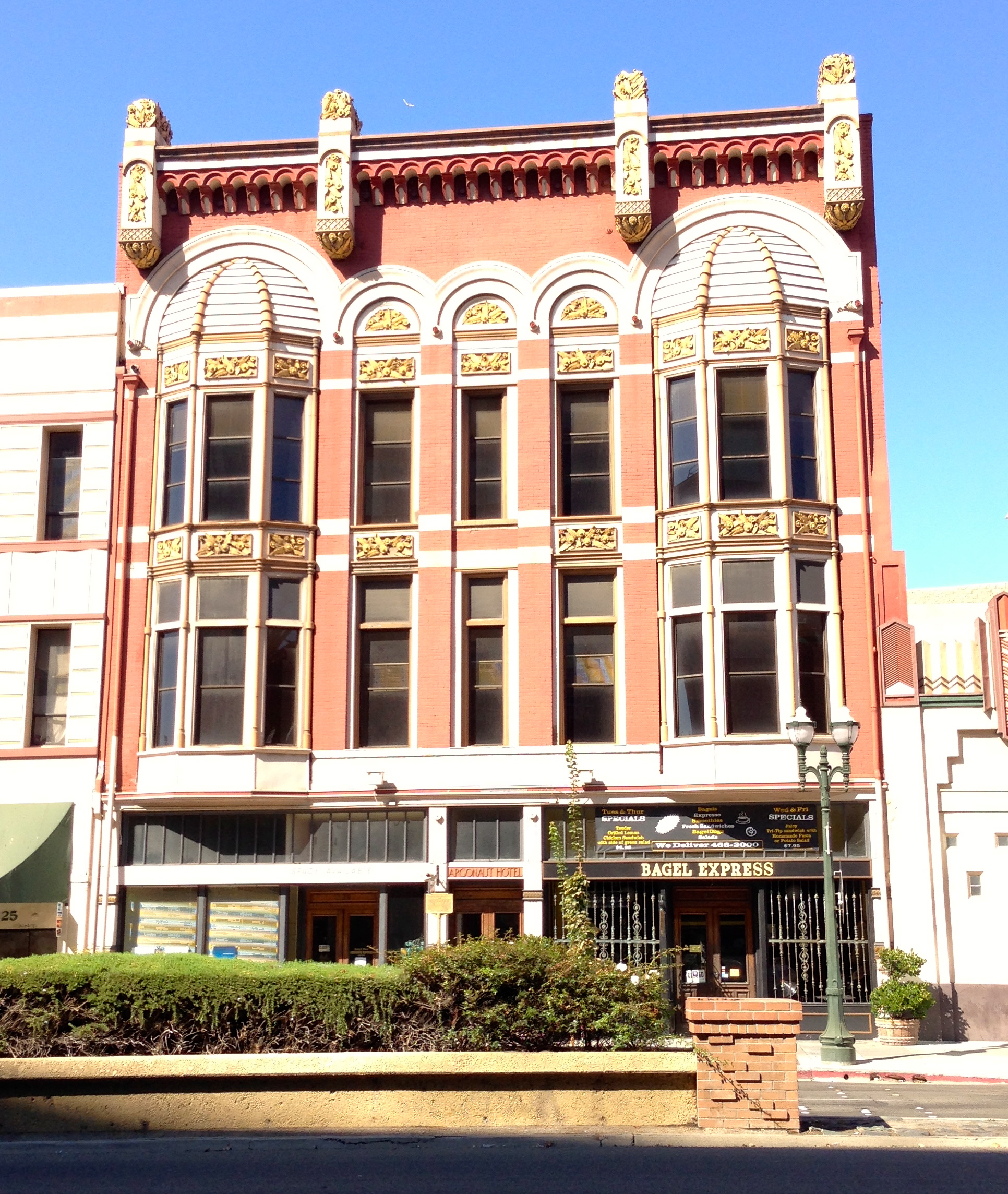

- Location within California Location within the United States
- Location: 229 E. Weber St., Stockton, California
- Coordinates: 37°57′6″N 121°17′14″W
- Area: 0.3 acres (0.12 ha)
- Built: 1892
- Architectural style: Queen Anne
- NRHP reference No.: 82000987
- Added to NRHP: October 29, 1982

The Tretheway Block is a historic commercial building located at 229 E. Weber St. in Stockton, California. The building, which was built in 1892, is noteworthy due to its eclectic architecture. While the building was mainly designed in the Queen Anne style, it also includes Romanesque and Moorish influences. The building's front features three small bays with banded arches in the center and two large bays with partial ribbed domes on the sides; the domes and the banded arches are Moorish elements. The building is topped by a cornice made of corbelled arches and split by four vertical projections, exhibiting the Romanesque influence on the design. Zinc floral ornaments are located on the projections of the cornice and at various places on the bays.

The building was built by farmer John Tretheway and originally housed a hardware store on its first floor and lodging on its upper floors. In 1925, the building became a hotel called the Hotel Argonaut; it remained a hotel until the 1970s.

The Trethaway Block was added to the National Register of Historic Places on October 29, 1982.
