= Wong K. Gew Mansion =

Historic house in California, United States

- U.S. National Register of Historic Places
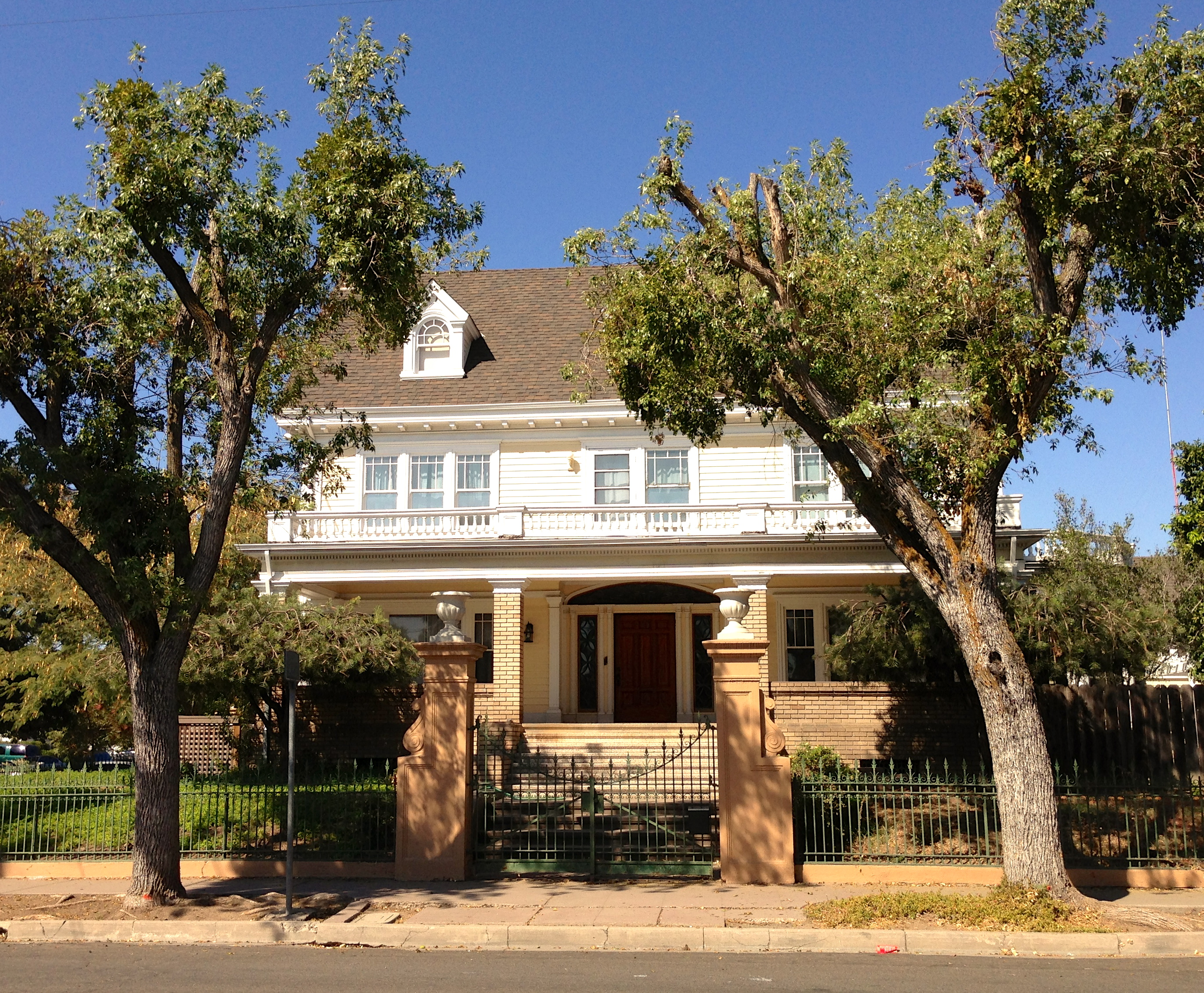

- Location within California Location within the United States
- Location: 345 W. Clay St., Stockton, California
- Coordinates: 37°56′21″N 121°17′29″W
- Area: less than one acre
- Built: 1921
- Architect: Losekann & Clowdsley
- Architectural style: Federal Revival
- NRHP reference No.: 78000761
- Added to NRHP: September 20, 1978

The Wong K. Gew Mansion is a historic house located at 345 W. Clay St. in Stockton. The mansion was the home of Wong K. Gew, a Chinese immigrant and a successful gambler and proprietor of gaming houses. When Wong built his home in 1921, anti-Asian laws required that he build his home south of Main Street. The mansion was designed by Losekann and Clowdsley in a mainly Federal Revival style typical of large houses of the era. The design included a veranda and a second-floor balcony on the front of the house, boxed cornices with brackets and friezes on the eaves and walls, and three gabled dormers; the interior of the house includes a fireplace with a $2,200 Yum Nan marble mantle.

The Wong K. Gew Mansion was added to the National Register of Historic Places on September 20, 1978.
