= Nippon Hospital =

- U.S. National Register of Historic Places
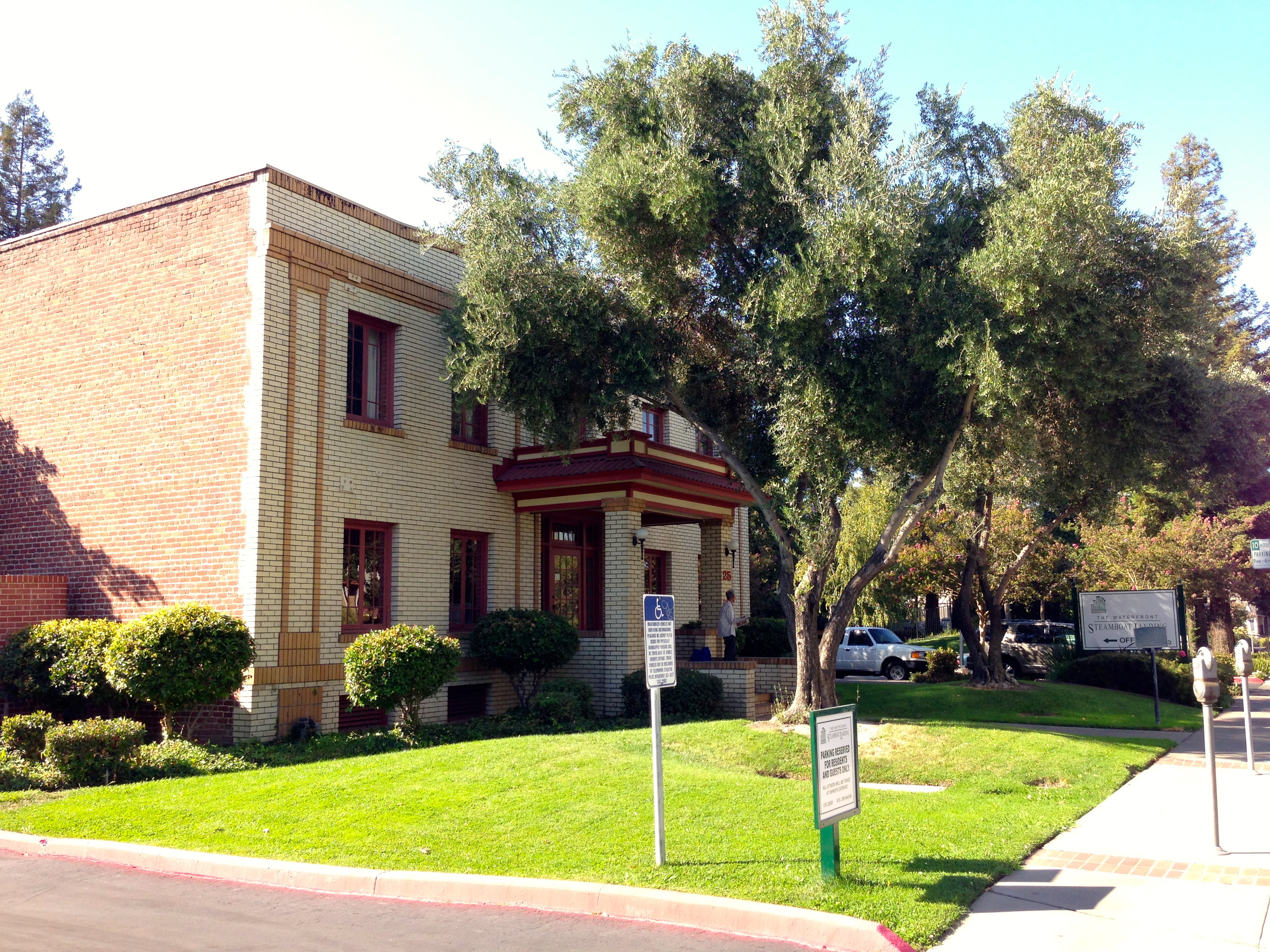

- Location within California Location within the United States
- Location: 25 S. Commerce St., Stockton, California
- Coordinates: 37°57′7″N 121°17′30″W
- Area: 0.2 acres (0.081 ha)
- Built: 1919
- NRHP reference No.: 78000762
- Added to NRHP: September 18, 1978

The Nippon Hospital is a historic hospital building located at 25 S. Commerce St. in Stockton, California. The hospital, which was built in 1919, served the Japanese community in Stockton, which at the time had one of the largest Japanese populations in the United States. Tokutaro Matsumoto, a farmer from the area, sponsored the hospital, which was proposed by a local Japanese community association. The hospital operated until 1930, when it became a hotel. The building is the only surviving structure from Stockton's early Japanese community. The location is currently used for low-income housing for seniors.

The Nippon Hospital was added to the National Register of Historic Places on September 18, 1978.
