= Moses Rodgers House =

Historic building in Stockton, California

- U.S. National Register of Historic Places
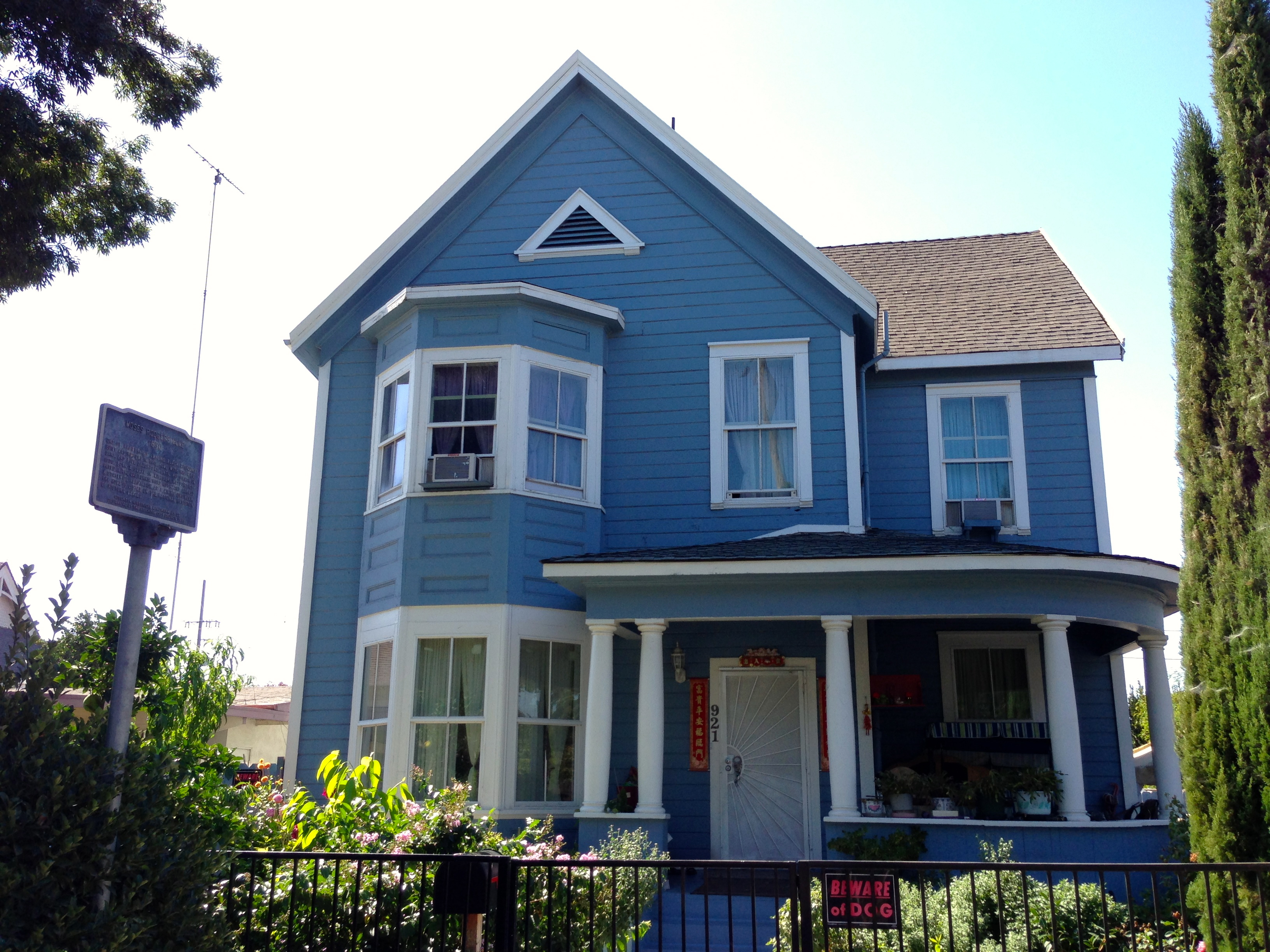
- Moses Rodgers House

- Location within Northern California
- Location: 921 S. San Joaquin St., Stockton, California
- Coordinates: 37°56′37″N 121°17′02″W
- Area: less than one acre
- Built: 1898
- Architectural style: Eclectic Vernacular
- NRHP reference No.: 78000763
- Added to NRHP: April 26, 1978

Moses Rodgers House is a private home in Stockton, California. Built in 1898, it was added to the National Register of Historic Places in 1978.

== History ==
Moses Rodgers was an African American mining engineer who became well known during the California Gold Rush for his success with the gold mines he owned and operated in Mariposa County. He moved his family to Stockton about 1890 to take advantage of education opportunities for his five daughters.

The Moses Rodgers House is a two-story, clapboard structure, approximately 25 by 40 feet (7.6 m × 12.2 m), with a curved colonial revival porch, and a steep front gable.

The historical marker on the Moses Rodgers House is inscribed

One of California’s leading Black citizens built and resided in this home with his wife, Sara, and five daughters until his death in 1900. Born a slave in Missouri, he participated in the California Gold Rush and earned a statewide reputation as a mining engineer. The home is listed on the National Register of Historic Places. Stockton Historical Landmark No.22 Designated by the Stockton City Council 1978
