= Philomathean Clubhouse =

- U.S. National Register of Historic Places
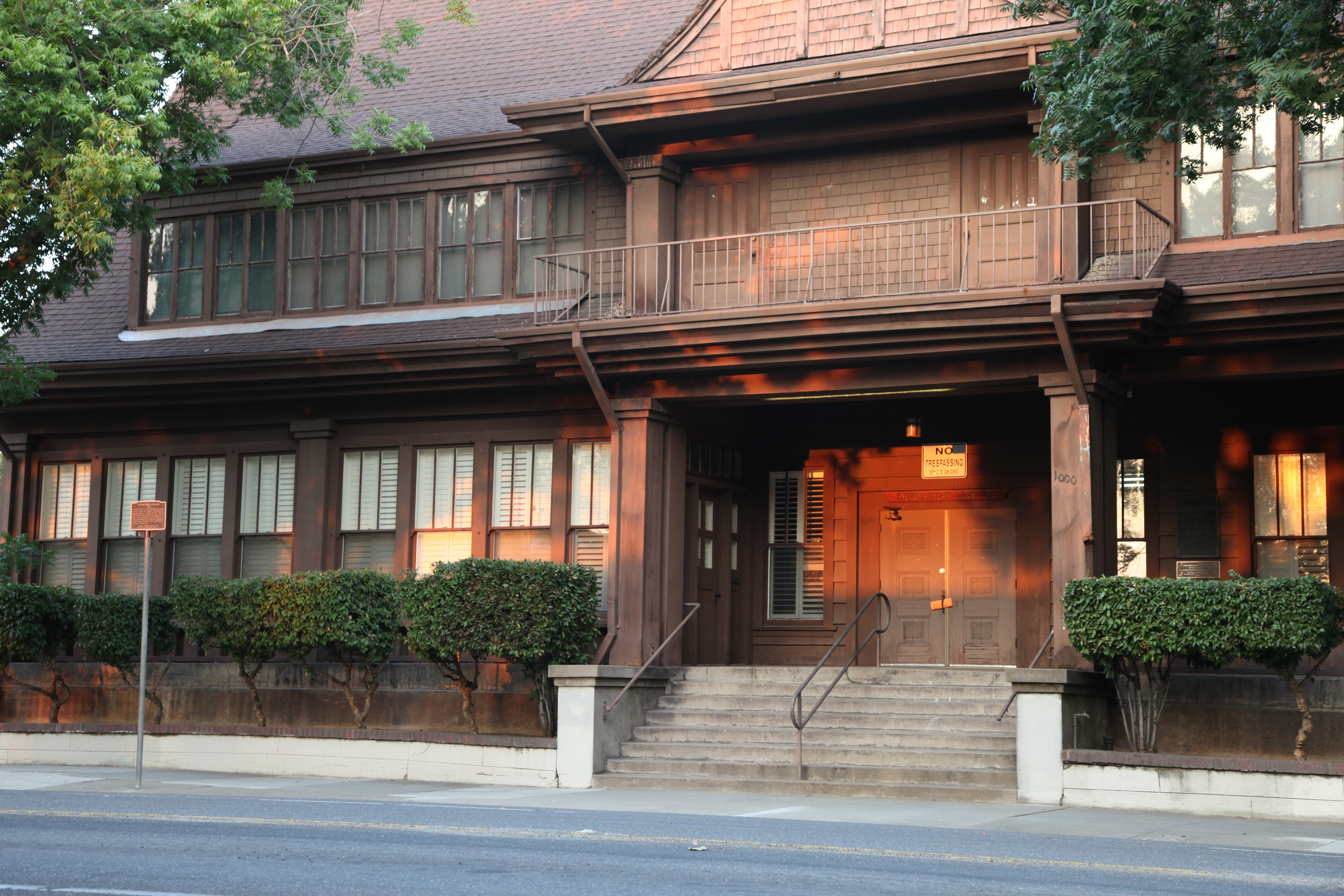

- Location within California
- Location: 1000 N. Hunter St., Stockton, California
- Coordinates: 37°57′47″N 121°17′28″W
- Area: less than one acre
- Built by: William E. Wood
- Architectural style: Craftsman
- NRHP reference No.: 08001278
- Added to NRHP: January 5, 2009

The Philomathean Clubhouse is a historic clubhouse in Stockton, California and served the Philomathean Club, a women's club. Its building was listed on the National Register of Historic Places in 2009.

The Philomathean Club (philomath, from the Greek, meaning "lover of learning") began in 1893 from a reading group of nine women. The club was formally organized eventually, and joined the California Federation of Women's Clubs in 1900. The group included a book discussion club and hosted speakers regarding contemporary political and social topics, supported literacy programs, as well having as more social functions such as tea and playing cards. It met in various venues including the public library, the Yosemite Theatre, the Elks Hall and the Hotel Stockton. It grew to have more than 300 women members in 1910, when it began a process to build its own building. The club chose to quit the California Federation of Women's Clubs in 1943 but continued to operate and contribute to Stockton. At one point, the roll included 700 members. and as of 2012 it had around 70.

The 5,900 square feet (550 m^{2}), two-story building was built during 1911-12 by local contractor William E. Wood. It is Craftsman in style. On February 9, 1912, the women's club began meeting in the clubhouse. The clubhouse includes an upstairs lecture hall, which also served as a ballroom. The lower level housed a kitchen and meeting rooms. Historic photographs at the Holt-Atherton Special Collections, University of the Pacific Library, show finely dressed Stocktonians on the front porch of the clubhouse in the 1930s.

In 1982, the membership wished to retain control over its building so it voted not to be included in Stockton's Magnolia Historical District. Following the Philomathean Club's decision, there were several break-ins at the clubhouse. At the same time, maintenance costs grew and membership diminished. In 2000, the City of Stockton purchased the building for $25,000 with the intention of using it to host public events. Due to the city's bankruptcy dealings in 2013, creditors pressed them to put for sale many historic properties, including the Philomathean Clubhouse. However, the terms of the city's deal with the club was that a new owner must allow the club to use the building on the condition the club maintains at least 10 members. Soon after the city removed the clubhouse from the list of properties for sale. In 2015 it was sold to a newly formed foundation named the Philomathean Foundation, whose goal was to make improvements to the building and use it for public events. The price of the sale was $28,500 despite a valuation of $400,000. At the time, the building was in such disrepair that city documents estimated it needed over $540,000 in renovations, the majority of the cost relating to the roofing.

As of 2016, work was still being done to the building to make it accessible to the public with the goal of it being used for weddings, cultural events, banquets, and more. By 2019, just before the outbreak of COVID-19, significant repairs had been made, but due to the pandemic the building has not been available for rental.
