= Lockeford, California =

Lockeford
- census-designated place
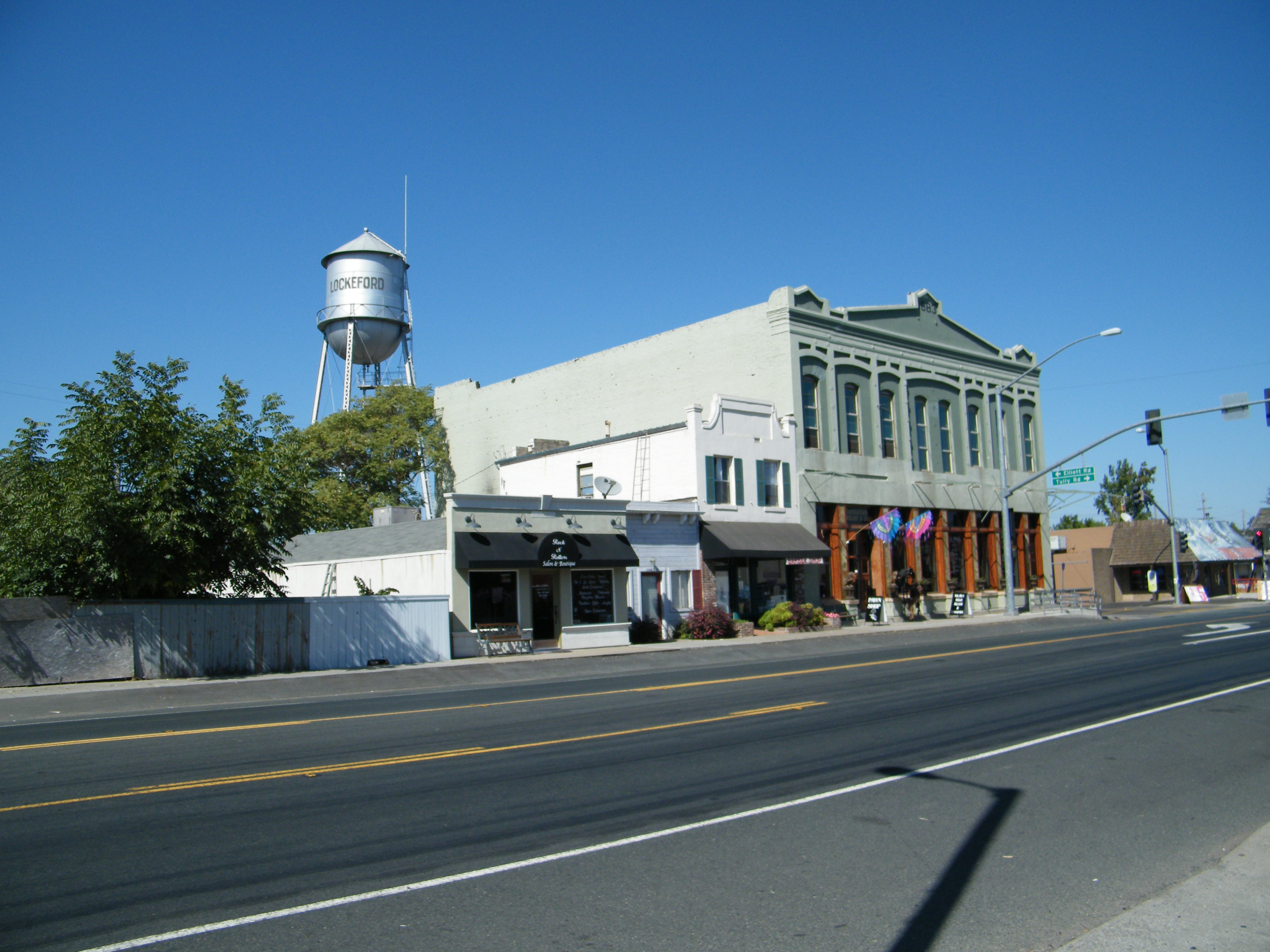
- Downtown Lockeford

- Location in San Joaquin County and the state of California

- Location in the United States
- Coordinates: 38°9′27″N 121°9′5″W
- Country: United States
- State: California
- County: San Joaquin

Government
  - Senate: Jerry McNerney (D)
  - Assembly: Heath Flora (R)
  - U. S. Congress: Josh Harder (D)

Area
  - Total: 8.387 sq mi (21.723 km^{2})
  - Land: 8.341 sq mi (21.603 km^{2})
  - Water: 0.046 sq mi (0.120 km^{2}) 0.55%
- Elevation: 102 ft (31 m)

Population (2020)
  - Total: 3,521
  - Density: 422.1/sq mi (163.0/km^{2})
- Time zone: UTC-8 (PST)
  - Summer (DST): UTC-7 (PDT)
- ZIP code: 95237
- Area code: 209
- FIPS code: 06-42104
- GNIS feature ID: 0277543

California Historical Landmark
- Reference no.: 365

Lockeford is an unincorporated community in San Joaquin County, California, United States. For statistical purposes, the United States Census Bureau has defined Lockeford as a census-designated place (CDP). The census definition of the area may not precisely correspond to local understanding of the area with the same name. The population was 3,521 at the 2020 census, up from 3,233 at the 2010 census.

== History ==
Lockeford is registered as California Historical Landmark #365. The town is named after Dean Jewett Locke, who, with his brother Elmer, settled in the area in 1851. Dean Locke then established a ranch and later the town in the region. It was Dean Locke's wife Delia who first coined the name "Lockeford" in 1859, referencing the ford that he built across the Mokelumne River. Delia Locke's diaries chronicled the early history of Lockeford and her family's history in founding the town. They are available at the University of the Pacific.

On June 13, 2022, Amazon announced that customers in Lockeford will be among the first in the United States to receive Amazon orders via the Amazon Prime Air drone delivery program.

== Geography ==
Lockeford is located at 38°9′27″N 121°9′5″W (38.157565, -121.151455).

According to the United States Census Bureau, the CDP has a total area of 8.4 square miles (22 km^{2}), 99.45% of it land, and 0.55% of it water.

The town is served by California State Route 88, one of four routes that crosses over the Sierra Nevada in the region.

== Demographics ==
Historical population
Census	Pop.	Note	%±
1980	1,852		—
1990	2,722		47.0%
2000	3,179		16.8%
2010	3,233		1.7%
2020	3,333		3.1%
U.S. Decennial Census; 1860–1870 1880-1890; 1900 1910 1920; 1930 1940 1950; 1960 1970 1980; 1990 2000 2010

Lockeford first appeared as a census designated place in the 1980 United States census.

=== Racial and ethnic composition ===
Lockeford CDP, California – Racial and ethnic composition Note: the US Census treats Hispanic/Latino as an ethnic category. This table excludes Latinos from the racial categories and assigns them to a separate category. Hispanics/Latinos may be of any race.
Race / Ethnicity (NH = Non-Hispanic)	Pop 2000	Pop 2010	Pop 2020	% 2000	% 2010	% 2020
White alone (NH)	2,258	2,102	1,917	71.03%	65.02%	57.52%
Black or African American alone (NH)	2	10	18	0.06%	0.31%	0.54%
Native American or Alaska Native alone (NH)	21	10	8	0.66%	0.31%	0.24%
Asian alone (NH)	43	57	54	1.35%	1.76%	1.62%
Native Hawaiian or Pacific Islander alone (NH)	10	9	11	0.31%	0.28%	0.33%
Other race alone (NH)	14	1	20	0.44%	0.03%	0.60%
Mixed race or Multiracial (NH)	47	88	142	1.48%	2.72%	4.26%
Hispanic or Latino (any race)	784	956	1,163	24.66%	29.57%	34.89%
Total	3,179	3,233	3,333	100.00%	100.00%	100.00%

=== 2020 census ===
As of the 2020 census, Lockeford had a population of 3,333 and a population density of 399.6 inhabitants per square mile (154.3/km^{2}).

The age distribution was 22.7% under the age of 18, 7.6% aged 18 to 24, 23.0% aged 25 to 44, 26.2% aged 45 to 64, and 20.6% who were 65 years of age or older. The median age was 42.2 years. For every 100 females there were 100.1 males, and for every 100 females age 18 and over there were 95.6 males age 18 and over.

The census reported that 99.4% of the population lived in households, 19 people (0.6%) lived in non-institutionalized group quarters, and no one was institutionalized. There were 1,179 households, of which 29.7% had children under the age of 18 living in them. Of all households, 52.9% were married-couple households, 5.8% were cohabiting couple households, 18.5% were households with a male householder and no spouse or partner present, and 22.8% were households with a female householder and no spouse or partner present. About 24.0% of households were made up of individuals and 13.3% had someone living alone who was 65 years of age or older. The average household size was 2.81, and there were 839 families (71.2% of all households).

There were 1,237 housing units at an average density of 148.3 units per square mile (57.3 units/km^{2}), of which 1,179 (95.3%) were occupied. Of the occupied units, 77.9% were owner-occupied and 22.1% were occupied by renters. The homeowner vacancy rate was 1.4% and the rental vacancy rate was 4.7%.

0.0% of residents lived in urban areas, while 100.0% lived in rural areas.

Racial composition as of the 2020 census
Race	Number	Percent
White	2,096	62.9%
Black or African American	21	0.6%
American Indian and Alaska Native	33	1.0%
Asian	58	1.7%
Native Hawaiian and Other Pacific Islander	12	0.4%
Some other race	588	17.6%
Two or more races	525	15.8%

=== Income and poverty ===
In 2023, the US Census Bureau estimated that the median household income was $93,438, and the per capita income was $47,494. About 6.5% of families and 7.9% of the population were below the poverty line.

=== 2010 census ===
The 2010 United States census reported that Lockeford had a population of 3,233. The population density was 385.5 inhabitants per square mile (148.8/km^{2}). The racial makeup of Lockeford was 2,526 (78.1%) White, 10 (0.3%) African American, 22 (0.7%) Native American, 64 (2.0%) Asian, 13 (0.4%) Pacific Islander, 413 (12.8%) from other races, and 185 (5.7%) from two or more races. Hispanic or Latino of any race were 956 persons (29.6%).

The Census reported that 3,217 people (99.5% of the population) lived in households, 16 (0.5%) lived in non-institutionalized group quarters, and 0 (0%) were institutionalized.

There were 1,142 households, out of which 401 (35.1%) had children under the age of 18 living in them, 650 (56.9%) were opposite-sex married couples living together, 103 (9.0%) had a female householder with no husband present, 73 (6.4%) had a male householder with no wife present. There were 70 (6.1%) unmarried opposite-sex partnerships, and 5 (0.4%) same-sex married couples or partnerships. 257 households (22.5%) were made up of individuals, and 127 (11.1%) had someone living alone who was 65 years of age or older. The average household size was 2.82. There were 826 families (72.3% of all households); the average family size was 3.32.

The population was spread out, with 829 people (25.6%) under the age of 18, 264 people (8.2%) aged 18 to 24, 743 people (23.0%) aged 25 to 44, 929 people (28.7%) aged 45 to 64, and 468 people (14.5%) who were 65 years of age or older. The median age was 39.2 years. For every 100 females, there were 108.2 males. For every 100 females age 18 and over, there were 101.8 males.

There were 1,221 housing units at an average density of 145.6 per square mile (56.2/km^{2}), of which 862 (75.5%) were owner-occupied, and 280 (24.5%) were occupied by renters. The homeowner vacancy rate was 2.3%; the rental vacancy rate was 11.1%. 2,278 people (70.5% of the population) lived in owner-occupied housing units and 939 people (29.0%) lived in rental housing units.

== Notable people ==
- Weldon B. Cooke, Aviation pioneer
- Ken Shamrock, former UFC fighter and professional wrestler
