= Earle E. Williams =

Local California historian (1898–1983)

Earle E. Williams (1898–1983) was a California historian who wrote articles, pamphlets, essays and biographies focused on the local region around southwest San Joaquin County and Tracy, California, where he grew up in and lived nearly all his life.

Williams was born on January 1, 1898, in Woodside, California, to George and Frances Belknap Williams. In 1910, he moved to Tracy where he lived with his sister and her husband on their ranch in the Vernalis area and attended New Jerusalem School and Tracy Joint Union High School. After leaving school in 1914 at age 16, he worked locally in the aggregates industry for many years. In 1928, Williams married Elinor Counihan of Petaluma and settled in Tracy, California, where they raised two children. In 1946, he founded and built the Kerlinger Plant of Pacific Cement and Aggregates on the alluvial fan of Corral Hollow Creek. He operated the plant until he retired in 1965. Williams died on July 4, 1983.

Williams was active in a variety of social and civic organizations including the Rotary Club, the West Side Pioneers (now the West Side Pioneer Association), San Joaquin Historical Society and the Native Sons of the Golden West. He was also president of the Tracy District Chamber of Commerce, the San Joaquin County Chamber of Commerce, and the San Joaquin County Historical Society; regional vice-president of District 8 of the Conference of California Historical Societies; and served on the Tracy Community Memorial Hospital board of directors, Tracy Planning Commission, and the Tracy City Council. He was also mayor of Tracy.

Williams' extensive historical research made him known as "the historian" of southern San Joaquin County. Among his writings are his books Old Spanish Trails of the San Joaquin Valley, El Camino Viejo: A Brief History of California's Forgotten Second Highway of the Pioneers, Carrell of Corral Hollow, and History of Tesla: A California Coal Mining Town.

The Bancroft Library of the University of California, Berkeley maintains a collection of Williams' correspondence, writings, photos, and research relating to the history of Tracy and San Joaquin County. It includes his research materials and drafts of his many books, articles, and stories about the Corral Hollow area and its ghost towns, including San Joaquin City, Carnegie, and Tesla, along with the El Camino Viejo trail.
