= Carbona =

Carbona may refer to:

- Carbona, a genus of moth
- Carbona, California, United States
- Carbonne (Occitan: Carbona), France
- Delta Carbona L.P., an American chemical company, maker of Carbona Cleaning Fluid
