= Corral Hollow Creek =

Stream in California and former route of El Camino Viejo

Corral Hollow Creek Buenos Ayres Creek
- Location of the mouth of Corral Hollow Creek in California
- Native name: Arroyo De Los Buenos Aires/Ayres (Spanish)

Location
- Country: United States
- State: California
- Counties: Alameda, San Joaquin

Physical characteristics
- Source: Northern slope of Smiths Ridge in the Diablo Range
  - location: 2.2 mi (0 km) north of Mount Boardman, San Joaquin County, California
  - coordinates: 37°30′48.1″N 121°28′50.7″W
  - elevation: 2,827 feet (862 m)
- Mouth: Delta-Mendota Canal
  - location: 4.3 miles South of Tracy, California, San Joaquin County
  - coordinates: 37°40′42″N 121°25′58″W
  - elevation: 197 ft (60 m)
- Length: 31.4 mi (50.5 km)

Basin features
- Tributaries
  - left: Elk Ravine

Corral Hollow Creek, originally El Arroyo de los Buenos Ayres (The Creek of the Good Winds), is an ephemeral/semi-perennial 31.4-mile-long (50.5 km) stream that drains the eastern side of the Diablo Range and flows through Alameda and San Joaquin Counties to California's San Joaquin Valley, where it joins the Delta–Mendota Canal.

== History ==
The creek was originally named Portezuela ('pass') de Buenos Ayres on the diseno of las Positas in 1834. It appears by 1852 as Arroyo de los Buenos Ayres or Aires, but the name later changed from Spanish to the English Corral Hollow Creek in the 1850s when numerous corrals were built to hold captured wild horses. For further detail, see Corral Hollow.

== Watershed and Course ==
The Corral Hollow Creek watershed drains 61.6 square miles (160 km^{2}) and is divided into three subwatersheds: the Upper Watershed (Western portion) located in Alameda County, and containing the Tesla Reserve (approx. 3,100 acres), the Middle Watershed containing Corral Hollow Canyon and the Carnegie State Vehicular Recreation Area (Carnegie SVRA), which accounts for 43.6 square miles (113 km^{2}) of the total drainage area tributary to that point, and Lower Watershed (Eastern portion) located in San Joaquin County, where the creek exits the canyon and historically emptied into the San Joaquin Valley floor (now diverted by the Delta-Mendota Canal). Corral Hollow Creek historically extended further east before sinking into the marshes approaching the San Joaquin River.

Corral Hollow Creek begins 2.2 miles (3.5 km) north of Mount Boardman in southwest San Joaquin County. It then flows north 1.9 miles where it turns to flow west 3.3 miles (5.3 km). Here, just east of Mount Wallace on the Diablo Range watershed divide, the creek flows northwest 11.5 miles (18.5 km) and is crossed by the Hetch Hetchy Aqueduct. The Diablo Range watershed divide in this region runs south to north through Mount Mocho, Mount Boardman, Mount Wallace and eventually to Altamont Pass. East of the divide waters flow to the San Joaquin River and west of it they flow via the Arroyo Mocho watershed to Alameda Creek and San Francisco Bay. Just west of the historic coal mining town of Tesla, California, Coral Hollow Creek turns abruptly east and flows through 10 miles (16 km) long Corral Hollow Canyon and back into San Joaquin County again. Corral Hollow Canyon ends where the creek's only named tributary, Elk Ravine, joins the creek mainstem at about 400 feet (120 m) elevation. From there Corral Hollow Creek turns again in a northeasterly direction into the plain of the San Joaquin Valley where it flows for 4.7 miles (7.6 km) where it then crosses Interstate 580 and then the California Aqueduct to continue to the Delta-Mendota Canal, 4.3 miles (6.9 km) south of Tracy, California. The Delta–Mendota Canal carries flows south to the San Joaquin River at Mendota, California.

From interstate 580, Corral Hollow Road ascends to and up Corral Hollow Canyon until it becomes Tesla Road, leading on to Livermore, California.

== Ecology ==
The San Joaquin kit fox (Vulpes macrotis mutica) historically occupied an extensive range in the San Joaquin Valley of California, but surveys including Corral Hollow Canyon suggest they died out by 2002 likely due to multiple factors including road mortality on Interstate 580, predation by coyotes (Canis latrans), competition for rodent prey by invading non-native red fox (Vulpes vulpes), and rodenticides used by ranchers to kill California ground squirrels (Otospermophilus beecheyi).

Perhaps consistent with the historical designation of Corral Hollow Creek's only named tributary, Elk Ravine, tule elk (Cervus canadensis nannodes) herds numbering three to four dozens have persisted for decades in Corral Hollow and nearby Connoly Ranch since dispersals from 1978 to 1981 elk translocations to the Hewlett-Packard San Felipe Ranch on Mount Hamilton. However, the elk are boxed in from further range expansion by Interstate 580 to the north and east.

In April, 2020 the California Fish and Game Commission designated Southern California/Central Coast Evolutionarily Significant Unit (ESU) puma (Puma concolor) as a candidate species under the California Endangered Species Act (CESA). A MIG, Inc. environmental study employed motion-sensitive cameras to observe puma utilization of the Carnegie State Vehicular Recreation Area (SVRA) and documented puma presence, noting relative avoidance of areas of off-road-vehicular (OHV) use as well as complete avoidance of the high-speed 2-lane rural Corral Hollow and Tesla Roads by 0.62 miles (1.00 km). Half of the puma observations were along Corral Hollow Creek in the non-off-road vehicular use (non-OHV) area and indicated regular occupancy.
