= VP-148 =

Patrol Squadron 148
- Active: 16 August 1943 – 15 June 1946
- Country: United States of America
- Branch: United States Navy
- Type: squadron
- Role: Maritime patrol
- Engagements: World War II

Aircraft flown
- Patrol: PV-1; PV-2

VP-148 was a Patrol Squadron of the U.S. Navy. The squadron was established as Bombing Squadron 148 (VB-148) on 16 August 1943, redesignated Patrol Bombing Squadron 148 (VPB-148) on 1 October 1944, redesignated Patrol Squadron 148 (VP-148) on 15 May 1946 and disestablished on 14 June 1946.

== Operational history ==
- 16 August 1943 – 16 January 1944: VB-148 was established at NAS Alameda, California, as a medium bombing squadron flying the PV-1 Ventura. During its entire training phase, the squadron remained under the operational control of FAW-8. After forming, the squadron was relocated to a training facility at NAAS Vernalis, California, where squadron personnel received ground training. On 3 October, the first Venturas arrived for the flight training phase of the syllabus. Upon completion of the flight training phase, the squadron’s aircraft were flown to the Naval Ordnance Testing Station at Inyokern, California, where rocket launcher rails were installed. Training in use of the air-to-ground missiles ran from 31 December 1943 to 16 January 1944. On completion of the rocket attack training, the squadron returned to NAAS Vernalis to begin preparations for transportation to Hawaii.
- 3–12 February 1944: VB-148 loaded its equipment, aircraft and personnel aboard USS Nehenta Bay for transport to Naval Base Pearl Harbor, Hawaii. The squadron arrived on 10 February and quickly unloaded and reassembled the aircraft for the short hop to NAS Kaneohe Bay. Training under the operational control of FAW-2 began on 12 February.
- 20 March 1944: VB-148 departed NAS Kaneohe Bay in three aircraft elements for Renard Field, Russell Islands, to relieve VB-140.
- 3 April – May 1944: The squadron was sent to Munda, New Georgia, to provide fighter cover for C-47s carrying paratroops going into New Guinea. From this date until relieved, the squadron came under the operational control of FAW-1. On 14 April, the squadron suffered its first casualty of the tour when Lieutenant William T. Henderson was shot down while overflying the Kahili Airfield, Bougainville. Henderson ditched the aircraft four miles east of Balalae Island and three of the crew of five were rescued by a Dumbo (air-sea rescue). The second squadron loss came on 3 May 1944, when Lieutenant William E. Davis and crew were declared missing in action after failing to return from a strike on Bougainville. The squadron remained at Munda until 20 May, when orders were received to relocate to Emirau. Twice daily long-range search and patrol missions to the western Carolines were coordinated with a destroyer squadron and CVE to pinpoint enemy dispositions and to conduct joint attacks against shipping. Two squadron aircraft were credited with downing two enemy twin engine bombers while on patrol.
- 28 May – A VB-148 PV-1 Ventura mistakenly attacked the U.S. Navy submarine USS Permit (SS-178) with depth charges in the Pacific Ocean in the vicinity of 06°45′N 151°52′E. Permit submerged as the aircraft approached, but an explosion occurred as she passed a depth of 115 feet (35 m) which inflicted damage on her. She suffered no casualties.
- 26 July 1944: One of the squadron aircraft spotted a convoy of Japanese vessels while on patrol southwest of Truk. A six-plane strike was organized and subsequent attacks on the convoy resulted in the sinking of four ships totalling 2,200 tons, and the downing of two enemy escort fighters without any losses to the squadron.
- 22 October – 15 December 1944: VPB-148 was relieved at Emirau by a Royal New Zealand Air Force squadron for return to NAS Kaneohe Bay, arriving there on 31 October. Squadron personnel were put aboard USS Chenango on 22 November, for return to the West Coast. After arriving at NAS Alameda on 15 December, all hands were reclassified and given home leave.
- 10 January – April 1945: VPB-148 was reformed at NAS Whidbey Island, Washington, under the operational control of FAW-6. Training in the PV-1 Ventura was commenced on glide bombing, navigation, and advanced instrument flying. The syllabus was completed at the end of April 1945 and the squadron was relocated to NAS Moffett Field, California, to await transportation to Pearl Harbor.
- 30 May – 16 August 1945: Personnel were loaded aboard USS Copahee for transportation to Pearl Harbor. After arrival on 5 June, the squadron was assigned 15 PV-2 Harpoons at NAS Kaneohe Bay, coming under the operational control of FAW-2. A detachment of six aircraft was formed immediately and sent to Midway Island. A second detachment of three aircraft was flown to Johnston Atoll. Both detachments engaged in anti-submarine warfare patrols and long range searches in the vicinity of the islands. At NAS Kaneohe Bay, the remainder of the squadron began the combat training syllabus. The detachments returned on 16 August 1945 to NAS Kaneohe Bay to complete their portion of the combat training.
- September 1945: With the Surrender of Japan the squadron was left with little to do other than routine patrols in the vicinity of the Hawaiian islands.
- 15 June 1946: VPB-148 was disestablished at NAS Kaneohe Bay.

== Aircraft assignments ==
The squadron was assigned the following aircraft, effective on the dates shown:

- PV-1 - October 1943
- PV-2 - June 1945

== Home port assignments ==
The squadron was assigned to these home ports, effective on the dates shown:

- NAS Alameda, California - 16 August 1943
- NAAS Vernalis, California - September 1943
- NAS Kaneohe Bay, Hawaii - 12 February 1944
- NAS Alameda - 15 December 1944
- NAS Whidbey Island, Washington - 10 January 1945
- NAS Moffett Field, California - April 1945
- NAS Kaneohe Bay - 5 June 1945

== See also ==
- Maritime patrol aircraft
- List of inactive United States Navy aircraft squadrons
- List of United States Navy aircraft squadrons
- List of squadrons in the Dictionary of American Naval Aviation Squadrons
- History of the United States Navy
