= John Treadwell (disambiguation) =

John Treadwell (1745–1823) was an American politician.

John Treadwell may also refer to:

- John Treadwell (miner) (1842–1927), Canadian gold miner in Alaska
- Johnny Treadwell (1941–2014), American football player

== See also ==
- John Treadwell Nichols (1883–1958), American ichthyologist
