= Carnegie, California =

Carnegie
- Former settlement
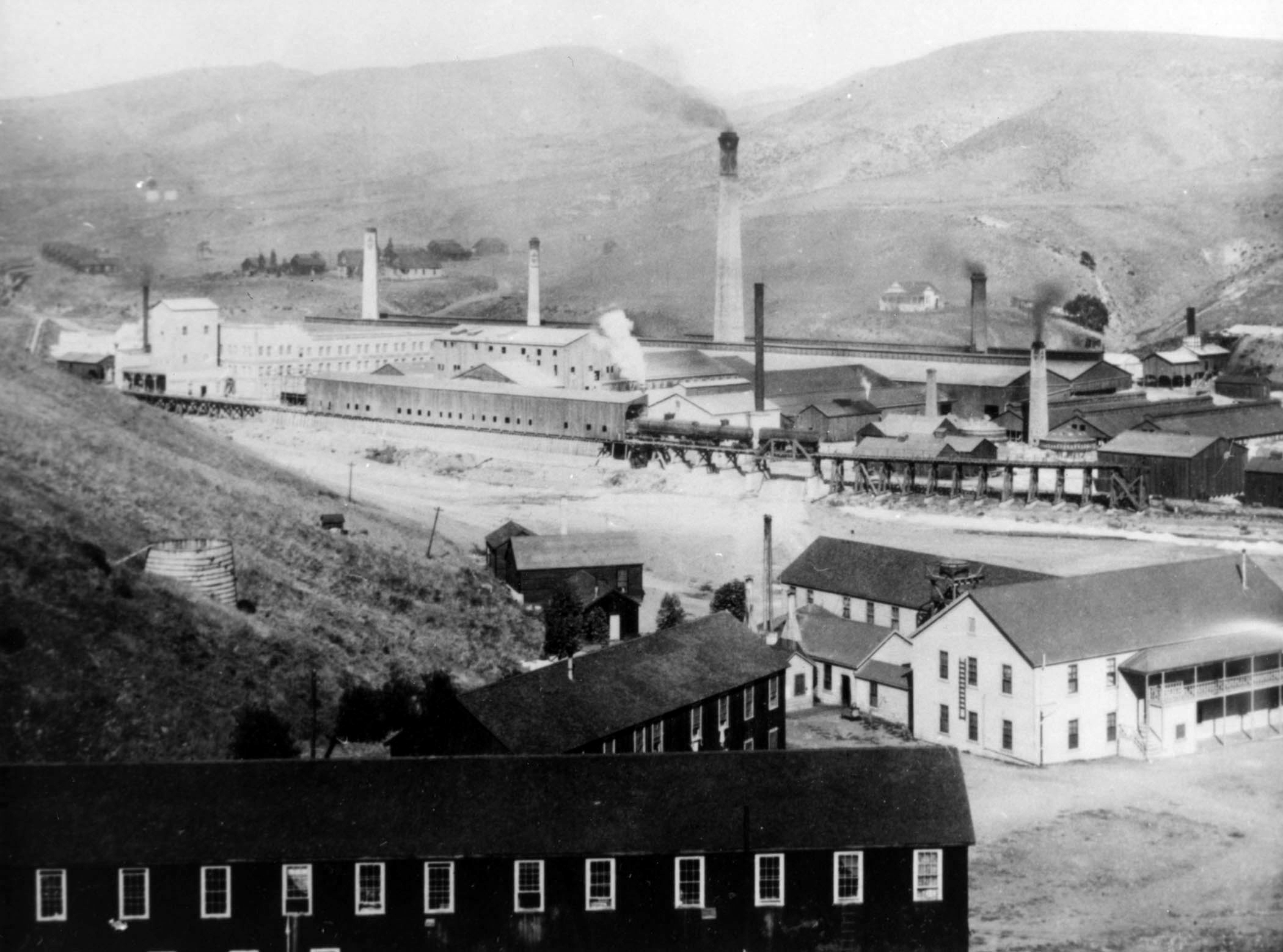
- Black and white photo of Carnegie after 1905
- Interactive map of Carnegie
- Coordinates: 37.62951°N 121.52797°W
- Country: United States
- State: California
- County: San Joaquin County

California Historical Landmark
- Reference no.: 464

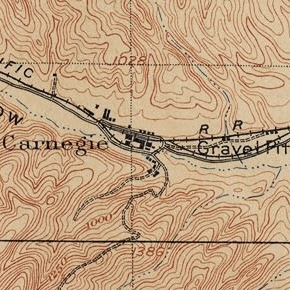
Topographic map of Carnegie

Carnegie was a town in Corral Hollow, in San Joaquin County, California from 1902 to about 1915.

It was discovered that the San Francisco & San Joaquin Coal Company's Tesla coal mines in Corral Hollow contained a rich deposit of clay. Fueled by California's rapid population growth and the subsequent demand for building materials, mine owners James and John Treadwell of the Treadwell gold mine formed the Carnegie Brick and Pottery Company in 1902. The Treadwells named the company after philanthropist Andrew Carnegie. In 1904 the plant to make brick and architectural terra cotta was built near the Alameda and San Joaquin Railroad line, four miles east of the coal mining town of Tesla. A town was in place with over 300 inhabitants (mainly Italian artisans) and the town's brick factory was producing upwards of 100,000 bricks per day. In 1904, the Pottery sewer pipe plant was built between Carnegie and Tesla.

In 1911 a flood destroyed bridges, roads, and buildings which the company could not afford to rebuild. The towns of Carnegie and Tesla were abandoned. The rail line from Carbona was abandoned by the Western Pacific Railroad in January 1916. In 1916 the company was sold to Gladding, McBean of Lincoln, California. In an effort to reduce competition, the new owners sold off the factory's equipment and destroyed what remained of the town's buildings. On May 27, 1917, the tall smokestacks at the plant were dynamited.

Today only the foundation of the brick works can be seen within the Carnegie State Vehicular Recreation Area. Materials from Carnegie Brick and Pottery were used to build the Natural History Museum of Los Angeles County, the Oakland Hotel, and the Carnegie libraries in Livermore and Lodi, California. The site of the former town is registered as a California Historical Landmark.

== See also ==
- List of ghost towns in California
