= Vernalis, California =

Unincorporated United States community

- Unincorporated community
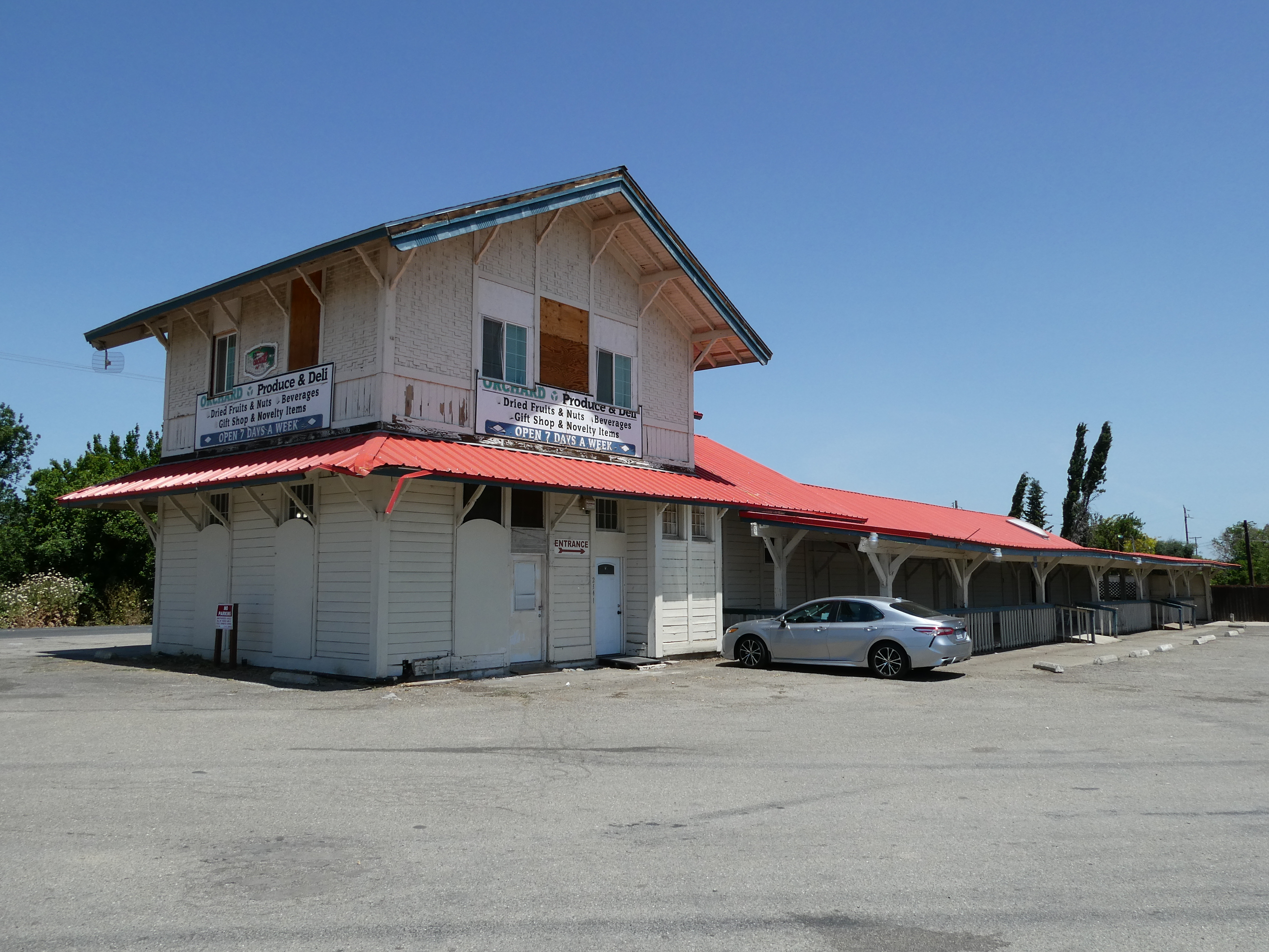
- The former Newman station in Vernalis in 2022

- Location within California Location within the United States
- Coordinates: 37°37′51″N 121°17′14″W
- Country: United States
- State: California
- County: San Joaquin
- Elevation: 105 ft (32 m)
- Time zone: UTC-8 (Pacific (PST))
  - Summer (DST): UTC-7 (PDT)
- ZIP code: 95385
- Area code: 209
- GNIS feature ID: 252823

Vernalis is an unincorporated community in San Joaquin County, California, United States. Vernalis is located on California State Route 33 10.5 miles (16.9 km) southeast of Tracy. The first post office in the area opened in San Joaquin City in 1851; that post office closed in 1852, reopened in 1874, and was moved 3 miles (4.8 km) southwest in 1888, after which its name was changed to Vernalis.

According to local historian Earle E. Williams, Vernalis, Latin for springlike, related to the spring, was named after two daughters of local ranchers, Verna Carpenter and Alice Hamilton. Vernalis has a post office with ZIP code 95385.

During World War II, Vernalis was the site of Naval Auxiliary Air Station Vernalis, Vernalis Reconditioning Center and Vernalis Prisoner of War Branch Camp.
