= Eberhardt School of Business =

School in Stockton, California, U.S.

University of the Pacific Eberhardt School of Business is one of seven schools and colleges of the University of the Pacific. The business school is located in Weber Hall on the school's main campus in Stockton, California.

The Eberhardt School of Business is a fully accredited member of the Association to Advance Collegiate Schools of Business. AACSB accreditation represents the highest standard of achievement for business schools worldwide. The School was renamed the Eberhardt School of Business in 1995 in recognition of the generous and substantial support given to both the School and the University by the Eberhardt family. Robert M. Eberhardt (a 1950 Business alumnus) succeeded his father as President of the Bank of Stockton and Chair of the Board of Regents. After his unexpected death in 1993, his wife, Mimi Eberhardt, assumed his position as a regent, while his brother, Douglass, a Class of 1959 Business alumnus, became President of the Bank of Stockton. Douglass Eberhardt subsequently became a regent of Pacific. Nine members of the Eberhardt family have received degrees from the University, and numerous employees of the Bank of Stockton and their families are Pacific alumni.

== Degrees ==
The Eberhardt School of Business offers several undergraduate and graduate degrees in the following concentrations:

Undergraduate Degree Programs Offered:

- Bachelor of Science in Accounting (BSAcc)
- Bachelor of Science in Business Administration (BSBA):
  - Accounting
  - Business Analytics
  - Finance
  - Management and Human Resources
  - Marketing Management
  - Sport Management & Analytics
  - Hotel & Hospitality Management

== Accounting Programs ==
- Bachelor of Science in Accounting
- Master of Accounting (MAcc)
- BS in Accounting/MAcc Blended

== Graduate Degree Programs Offered ==
- Master of Accounting (MAcc)
- MS Business Analytics
- MS Finance
- Online MBA

== Student Groups & Organizations ==
=== Eberhardt Student Investment Fund ===
The Eberhardt School of Business offers a two-term class for MBA and undergraduate business students called the Eberhardt Student Investment Fund (ESIF). Students are selected through a formal application process and have the ability to manage an investment portfolio currently approaching 5.0 million dollars. The Bank of Stockton and its President and CEO Douglass Eberhardt, sponsors the fund.

Two hundred of the 9,000 business schools worldwide operate a student investment fund. In the Eberhardt SIF, students do research and evaluation, write reports, and make choices regarding where and how to invest the fund's money. This is not a virtual investment or portfolio; this is real money and real investments.

Students participating in the ESIF will be accountable to its board, which consists of the dean, the vice president of business and finance for the university, and four investment professionals. An annual report of their investment activities and results will be written by the students and their work, transactions, and report are audited by an independent accounting firm, just like in a real investment fund.

=== Other Student Groups ===
- Beta Alpha Psi
- Beta Gamma Sigma
- Delta Sigma Pi
- Management and Human Resources Student Association
- Phi Alpha Delta

== History ==
- 1977 Business program was recognized as a separate school and named the School of Business and Public Administration (SBPA)
- 1982 SBPA moved into Weber Hall
- 1984 Business School accredited by the American Assembly of Collegiate Schools of Business
- 1989 Center for Management Development established
- 1991 Center for Management Development renamed The Westgate Center for Management Development
- 1993 Launched MBA program
- 1995 SBPA renamed to Eberhardt School of Business
- 2003 Business Forecasting Center established
- 2007 Eberhardt Student Investment Fund established
- 2007 Launched the 16-month full-time MBA program
- 2012 Celebrated 35 years as a professional school
- 2013 Launched the Bachelor of Science in Accounting (BSAcc) and Master of Accounting (MAcc) degrees
- 2014 Center for Business and Policy Research established
- 2021 Launched the Master of Science in Business Analytics
- 2021 Launched the Master of Science in Finance
- 2023 Launched the Online MBA
- 2023 Dreyfuss Family Fixed Income Fund established
