= Carbona, California =

Unincorporated community in California, United States

- Unincorporated community
- Location within California Location within the United States
- Coordinates: 37°41′46″N 121°24′44″W
- Country: United States
- State: California
- County: San Joaquin
- Elevation: 135 ft (41 m)
- Time zone: UTC-8 (Pacific (PST))
  - Summer (DST): UTC-7 (PDT)
- ZIP code: 95304
- Area code: 209
- GNIS feature ID: 1658219

Carbona is an unincorporated community in San Joaquin County, California, United States. Carbona is located on West Linne Road, 3.1 miles (5.0 km) south southeast of Tracy. Carbona's post office is Tracy but has its own ZIP code 95304.

== History ==
Carbona was originally a railroad station built at the junction with the Alameda and San Joaquin Railroad spur line to the Tesla coal mines in Corral Hollow. The spur line was closed in 1916, by the Western Pacific Railroad following a flood in 1911 when the railroad line, coal other facilities were destroyed and the towns of Carnegie and Tesla were abandoned. The Western Pacific's line is now the Union Pacific's Oakland Subdivision.
