= Stockton Savings and Loan Society Bank =

Historic bank building in California, U.S.

- U.S. National Register of Historic Places
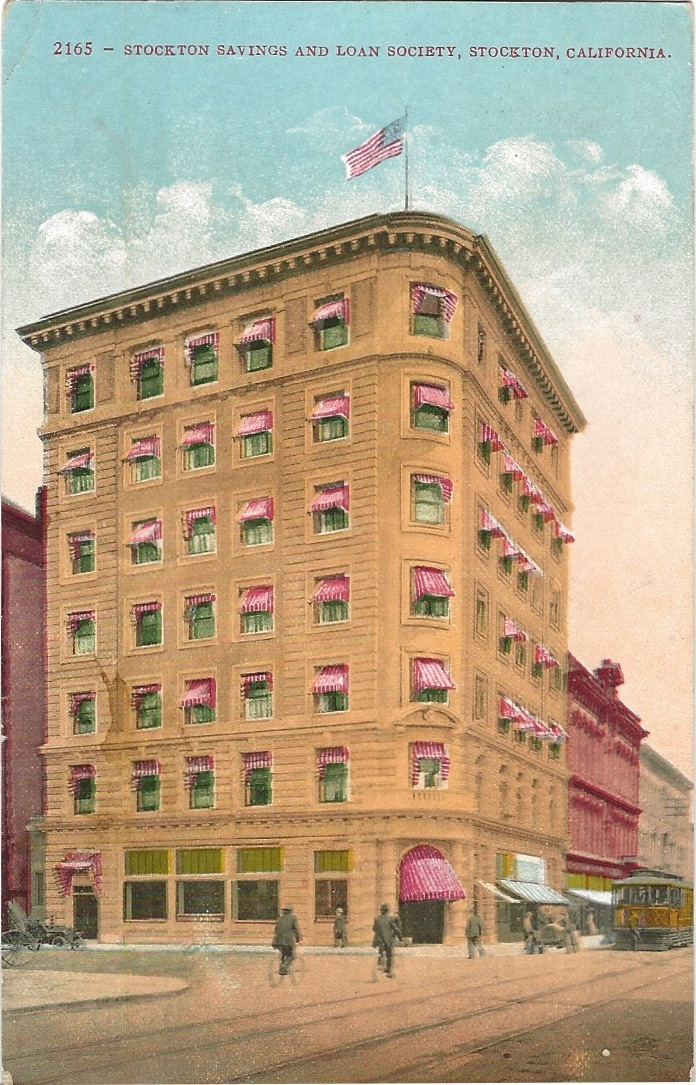
- Stockton Savings and Loan Society, Stockton, California.

- Location within California Location within the United States
- Location: Stockton, California
- Coordinates: 37°57′13″N 121°17′09″W
- Area: 1 acre (0.40 ha)
- Built: 1907-1908
- Architect: Myers & Ward
- Architectural style: Renaissance Revival architecture
- NRHP reference No.: 78000764
- Added to NRHP: October 19, 1978

Stockton Savings and Loan Society Bank (now Bank of Stockton) is a historic commercial building completed in 1908. It is located on 301 East Main Street in Stockton, California. The landmark was added to the National Register of Historic Places on October 19, 1978.

== History ==
On July 17, 1906, Stockton Savings and Loan Society stockholders authorized the expenditure for $250,000 to a build a new bank. The location of the new bank was on the northeast corner of Main and San Joaquin Street. The bank was Stockton's first skyscraper. The Stockton Savings and Loan Society Bank is a Renaissance Revival building constructed from 1907 to 1908. It is a steel-reinforced brick and terracotta building that is seven stories and penthouse on the eighth story. The classical design and brick masonry on the exterior gave Stockton an early nickname of "The Brick City." The bank lobby retains its original appearance including Tuolumne County marble wainscoting, marble tellers' counters, and marble and bronze patrons' counters. It has the original plate glass windows and marble flooring. The elevator serves four floors of offices plus three floors occupied by the Yosemite Club. The Yosemite Club is the oldest chartered men's club in California, dating back to 1888. The brick and terracotta used in the construction were made at the Carnegie Brick and Pottery Plant and is an example of a building constructed entirely of clay products from Carnegie. The Carnegie site has been designated California Historical Landmarks in San Joaquin County #740.

In 1907, contractor A. W. Cowell secured the contract for building the foundation for the bank building. The cost of the foundation was $7,009. The foundations were the first ones reinforced with concrete with steel girders running through them ever put down in Stockton. The eighth floor consists of dining and lounging rooms for club members. Myers & Ward of San Francisco were the architects. Edward B. Brown of Stockton drew the plans for the Yosemite Club.

It was the first building constructed by the Stockton Savings and Loan Society (now Bank of Stockton), which was established in 1867. For the first time in Stockton, the bank included a PBX, the first revolving door, private rooms for individuals to use Safe Deposit boxes, and a private waiting and rest area for woman.

== Gallery ==
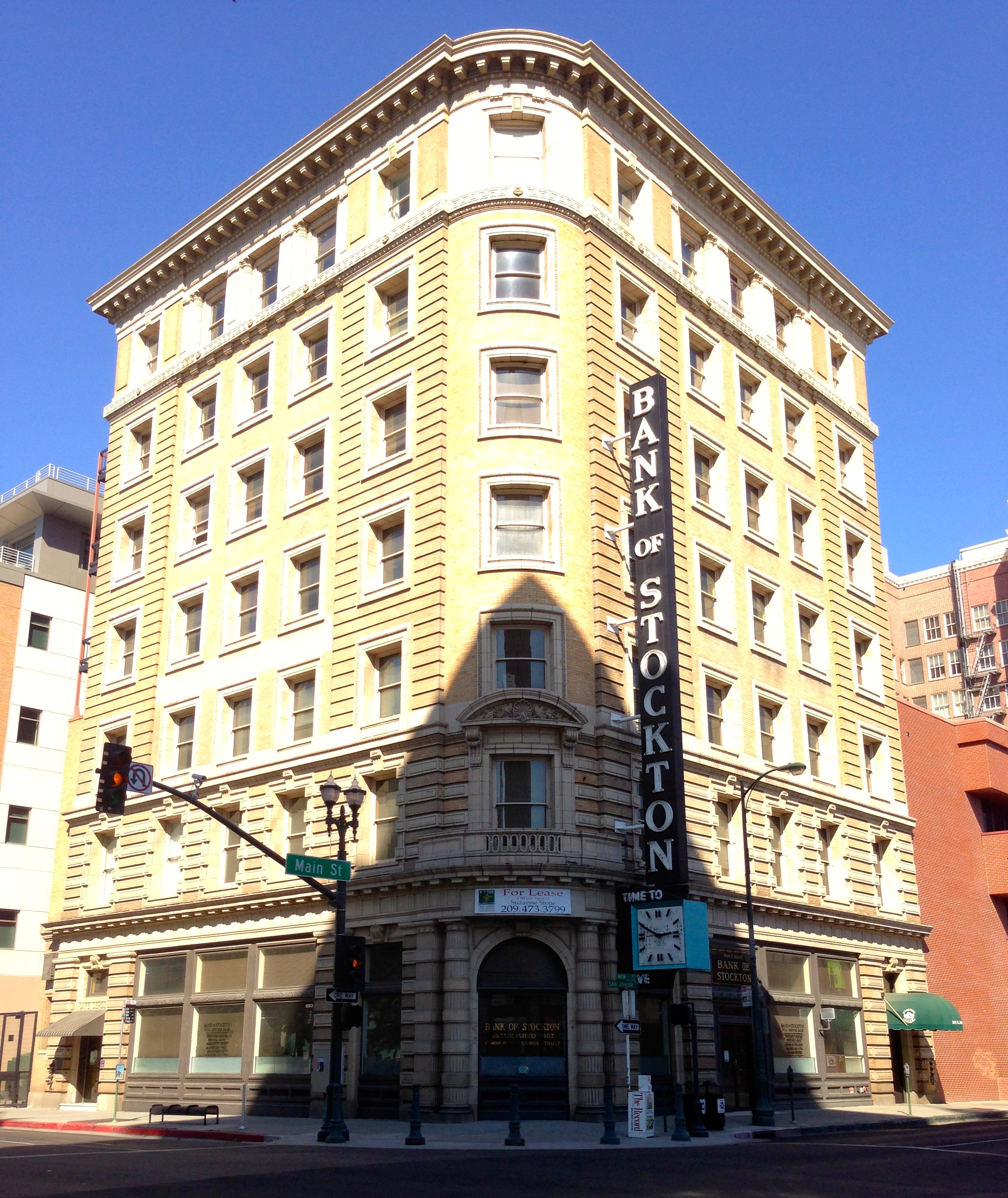
Stockton Savings and Loan Society Bank

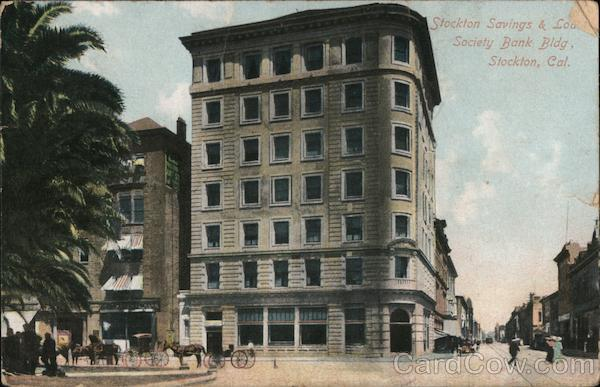
Stockton Savings & Loan Society Bank (1914)

== See also ==
- National Register of Historic Places listings in San Joaquin County, California
