= Modesto State Hospital =

Former public hospital (1946–1972)

Geography
- Location: Modesto, California, United States
- Coordinates: 37.662581°N 121.034957°W

Organization
- Type: Specialist

Services
- Speciality: Psychiatry

History
- Opened: 1947
- Closed: 1970

Links
- Lists: Hospitals in California

Modesto State Hospital was a public psychiatric hospital in the city of Modesto in Stanislaus County, California, and was established in 1946, opened in late-1947 and closed in 1970. It is the same location of the former Hammond General Hospital (1942–1946), a United States Army hospital during World War II.

== History ==
Modesto State Hospital was purchased from the United States federal government in November 1946 (under statutes 1946, ch. 129). The hospital operated as a temporary state mental hospital and when it opened in late-1947 it took in patients from other overcrowded state hospitals, specifically the mentally ill and the mentally deficient patients.

By September 1951 the Hospital started an admissions department and receive new psychiatric patients. In 1951, the hospital had its most patients 2,369, which it maintained until 1963. In 1963, the patient population declined, in 1969 it was announced the hospital would close, and was closed in 1970.

This hospital was one of the many state asylums that had sterilization centers.

== See also ==
- Eugenics in California
- List of hospitals in California
