= Hammond General Hospital =

Army Hospital in California

Coordinates: 37.662581°N 121.034957°W

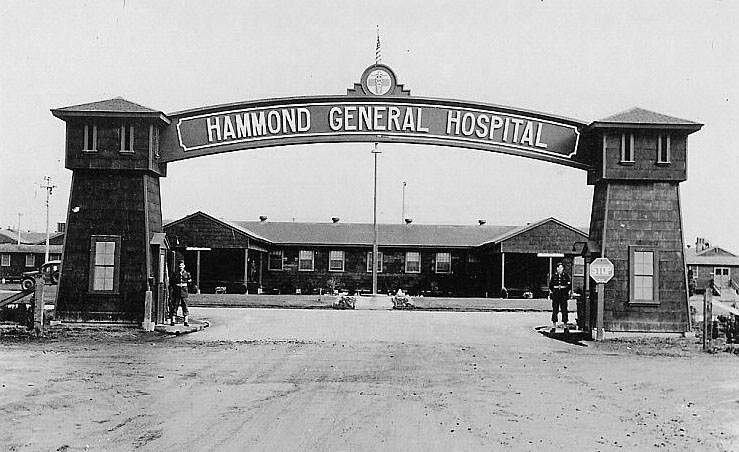
Hammond General Hospital in 1943

Hammond General Hospital, or Hammond Army Hospital, was a large United States Army medical treatment facility during World War II, located in the city of Modesto in Stanislaus County, California, and in operation from 1942 until 1946. The facility was preceded by the Modesto State Hospital, a public psychiatric hospital in operation from 1946 to 1972.

== History ==
Hammond General Hospital operated on 267 acres of land in Modesto, California purchased from the County of Stanislaus. Hammond General Hospital is named after Brigadier General William A. Hammond (1828–1900). William A. Hammond was appointed US Army Surgeon General by President Abraham Lincoln in 1862. William A. Hammond also founded the American Neurological Association in 1875.

The general hospital opened in 1942 with 2,540 beds to serve wounded servicemen. By the end of war, in 1945, the Hospital had 2,556-beds. The Hospital had 240 buildings that included 78 wards, convalescent wards, clinics, barracks, offices, warehouses, 6 mess halls, water treatment pump houses, laundry houses and utility shops. While serving the U.S. Army, the hospital facility maintained 6 "detention wards" for the mentally ill patients. To move supplies and troops a rail station off the Southern Pacific Railroad's Fresno Line was installed at the hospital.

Hammond General Hospital was closed in December 1945. The facility for Hammond General Hospital became the Modesto State Hospital in November 1946.

== Vernalis site ==
The Hammond General Hospital had a site, variously called Hammond General Hospital Convalescent Retraining Facility, Vernalis Reconditioning Center, or Vernalis Prisoner of War Branch Camp near the town of Vernalis, California on 52 acres. The Army built 938 temporary buildings that were used for the Vernalis Reconditioning Center, a large convalescent center for the wounded serviceman and to house prisoner of war at the Vernalis Prisoner of War Branch Camp. German POWs picked tomatoes, guayule, and worked in the farmland in the area. The camp held 757 prisoners who volunteered to work in agricultural jobs for better treatment. The POW camp had 250 trusted POWs work at the Reconditioning Center. The POW camp opened in June 1945 and closed in March 1946. The camp and center were near the Naval Auxiliary Air Station Vernalis, which gave some support to the center.

== See also ==
- California during World War II
- American Theater (1939–1945)
- United States home front during World War II
- List of hospitals in California
