= USS Permit (SS-178) =

Submarine of the United States

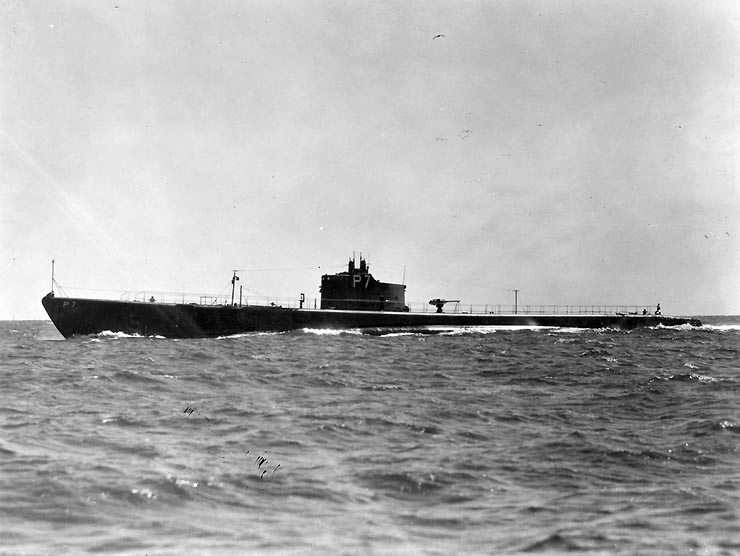
- USS Permit (SS-178)

History

United States
- Builder: Electric Boat Company, Groton, Connecticut
- Laid down: 6 June 1935
- Launched: 5 October 1936
- Commissioned: 17 March 1937
- Decommissioned: 15 November 1945
- Stricken: 26 July 1956
- Fate: Sold for scrap on 28 June 1958

General characteristics
- Class & type: Porpoise-class diesel-electric submarine
- Displacement: 1,350 long tons (1,370 t) standard, surfaced, 1,997 long tons (2,029 t) submerged
- Length: 298 ft (91 m) (waterline), 300 ft 6 in (91.59 m) (overall)
- Beam: 25 ft 7/8 in (7.6 m)
- Draft: 15 ft (4.6 m)
- Propulsion: As Built: 4 × Winton Model 16-201A 16-cylinder two-cycle diesel engines, 1,300 hp (0.97 MW) each, driving electrical generators through reduction gears, 2 × 120-cell Gould AMTX33HB batteries, 8 × General Electric electric motors, 538 hp (401 kW) each, 2 General Motors six-cylinder four-cycle 6-241 auxiliary diesels; Re-engined: 4 × Winton Model 12-278A
- Speed: 19.25 kn (35.65 km/h) surfaced, 8.75 kn (16.21 km/h) submerged
- Range: 11,000 nmi (20,000 km) @ 10 kn (19 km/h), (bunkerage 92,801 US gal (351,290 L)
- Endurance: 10 hours @ 5 kn (9.3 km/h), 36 hours @ minimum speed submerged
- Test depth: 250 ft (76 m)
- Complement: As built: 5 officers, 45 enlisted; 1945: 8 officers, 65 enlisted
- Armament: 6 × 21 inch (533 mm) torpedo tubes (four forward, two aft; 16 torpedoes) (two external bow tubes added 1942), 1 × 4 in (100 mm)/50 cal deck gun, 4 × .30 cal (7.62 mm) machineguns (2x2)

USS Permit (SS-178), a Porpoise-class submarine, was the first ship of the United States Navy to be named for the permit. She was laid down as Pinna.

== Construction and commissioning ==
Permit's keel was laid on 6 June 1935 by the Electric Boat Company at Groton, Connecticut. She was launched on 5 October 1936, sponsored by Mrs. Edith B. Bowen, wife of Harold G. Bowen, Chief of the Bureau of Engineering, and was commissioned on 17 March 1937, Lieutenant Charles O. Humphreys in command.

== Service history ==
=== Pre-World War II ===
Following shakedown, Permit operated from Portsmouth, New Hampshire, until 29 November 1937, when she got underway for the Pacific. Transiting the Panama Canal on 10 December, she continued up the West Coast, and arrived at San Diego, California on 18 December to join Submarine Squadron 6 (SubRon 6). For the next 22 months, she cruised the Eastern Pacific, ranging from southern California to the Aleutian Islands and Hawaiian Islands. In October 1939, she got underway for the Philippines to join the Asiatic Fleet.

=== World War II ===
Permit's first cruises were conducted in Philippine waters during 1940–1941. The two-year period of peace time activity gave the submarine's crew valuable training for later war activity. The ship - commanded by Lieutenant Commander Adrian M. Hurst - conducted her first war patrol off the west coast of Luzon from 11 to 20 December 1941. From 22 to 27 December, she made a second patrol in the area. Permit embarked members of Admiral Thomas C. Hart's staff at Mariveles Bay on 28 December and evacuated them to the Netherlands' Submarine Base, Surabaya, Java, arriving on 6 February 1942. En route, she completed a third war patrol, scouting in waters of the southern Philippines.

The submarine departed Surabaya for her fourth war patrol on 22 February, as the Japanese began to close on Java. On 19 February, Swordfish got through to Corregidor, which was still holding out against the Japanese. On 13 March, Permit sank the scuttled PT-32 of Motor Torpedo Boat Squadron Three. It was now Permit's turn to penetrate the blockade to the "Rock." She rendezvoused off Corregidor on the night of 15–16 March, took on board 40 officers and enlisted men (including 36 precious cryptanalysts from the intelligence station, CAST), and landed her ammunition. She headed for repairs at her new base, Fremantle, Western Australia, after minor damage suffered eluding three enemy destroyers on 18 March.

Permit departed Fremantle on 5 May, and until 11 June was engaged in her fifth war patrol off Makassar, Celebes Island and in the enemy shipping route stretching towards Balikpapan, Borneo. She made her sixth war patrol en route to Pearl Harbor - from 12 July-30 August - and shortly departed for the United States, entering Mare Island Navy Yard on 9 September for overhaul.

She conducted her seventh war patrol off Honshū, Japan from 5 February-16 March 1943. Towards sunset on 8 March, she attacked a nine-ship convoy with two escorts. Two hits sent Hisashima Maru to the bottom. Permit departed Midway Island on 6 April for her eighth war patrol in the shipping lanes from the Mariana Islands to Truk Atoll, Caroline Islands, and after several encounters, returned to Pearl Harbor on 25 May. On 7 July, Permit launched two torpedoes which sank Banshu Maru Number 33. Just after midnight, she spotted a two-ship convoy headed for the Korean coast, and with a salvo of two torpedoes sank Showa Maru in five minutes.

At approximately 18:30 on 9 July 1943, Permit mistakenly attacked the Soviet oceanographic research ship Seiner No. 20 with gunfire 27 nautical miles (50 km; 31 mi) off Kaiba To and 14 to 15 nautical miles (26 to 28 km; 16 to 17 mi) west of Todosima Island, setting the ship ablaze and killing two people. Upon discovering that she was a Soviet ship, Permit closed with her and rescued Seiner No. 20's 12 survivors, seven men and five women. Seiner No. 20 sank at 19:00. Under escort by the high-speed transport USS Kane (APD-18), Permit proceeded to the entrance to Dutch Harbor in the Aleutian Islands, where she transferred the survivors to Kane on 17 July.

On 20 July 1943, Permit joined the submarines USS Lapon (SS-260) and USS Plunger (SS-179) at Midway for the first wartime penetration into the Sea of Japan, to attack shipping carrying raw materials to Japan from Manchuria and Korea.

After this highly successful patrol, Permit made her way via Dutch Harbor, Alaska, to Pearl Harbor, arriving on 27 July. On 23 August, she departed for photographic reconnaissance of several atolls in the Marshall Islands. Off Kwajalein, she evaded aerial bombs on 3 September and depth charges on 9 September. She made attacks on enemy vessels, damaging several, before returning to Pearl Harbor on 24 September. Her next war patrol was in the Caroline Islands, held from early-January - mid-March 1944.

Her 12th war patrol was in the same region, on lifeguard duty in support of the air strikes on Truk. She remained on station from 7 May to 1 June 1944. On 28 May 1944 a PV-1 Ventura patrol bomber of U.S. Navy Bombing Squadron 148 (VB-148) mistakenly attacked her in the Pacific Ocean in the vicinity of 06°45′N 151°52′E, damaging her with a depth charge . Permit suffered no casualties.

Permit commenced her 13th patrol with her departure from Majuro Atoll on 30 June, and ended it with her arrival at Brisbane, Australia on 13 August. On 21 September, she departed to relieve Tarpon on lifeguard duty off Truk, and on 11 November ended her 14th and last war patrol at Pearl Harbor.

After refit, she sailed for the United States on 29 January 1945, and entered the Philadelphia Navy Yard on 23 February. In mid-May, she sailed to the Submarine Base, New London, Connecticut, to serve as a schoolship until 30 October, when she entered Boston Naval Shipyard for inactivation.

Permit decommissioned on 15 November 1945. Her name was stricken from the Naval Vessel Register on 26 July 1956; her hulk was sold for scrap to A.G. Schoonmaker, Inc., New York City on 28 June 1958.

== Awards ==
- Asiatic-Pacific Campaign Medal with 10 battle stars for World War II service
