= Bank of Stockton =

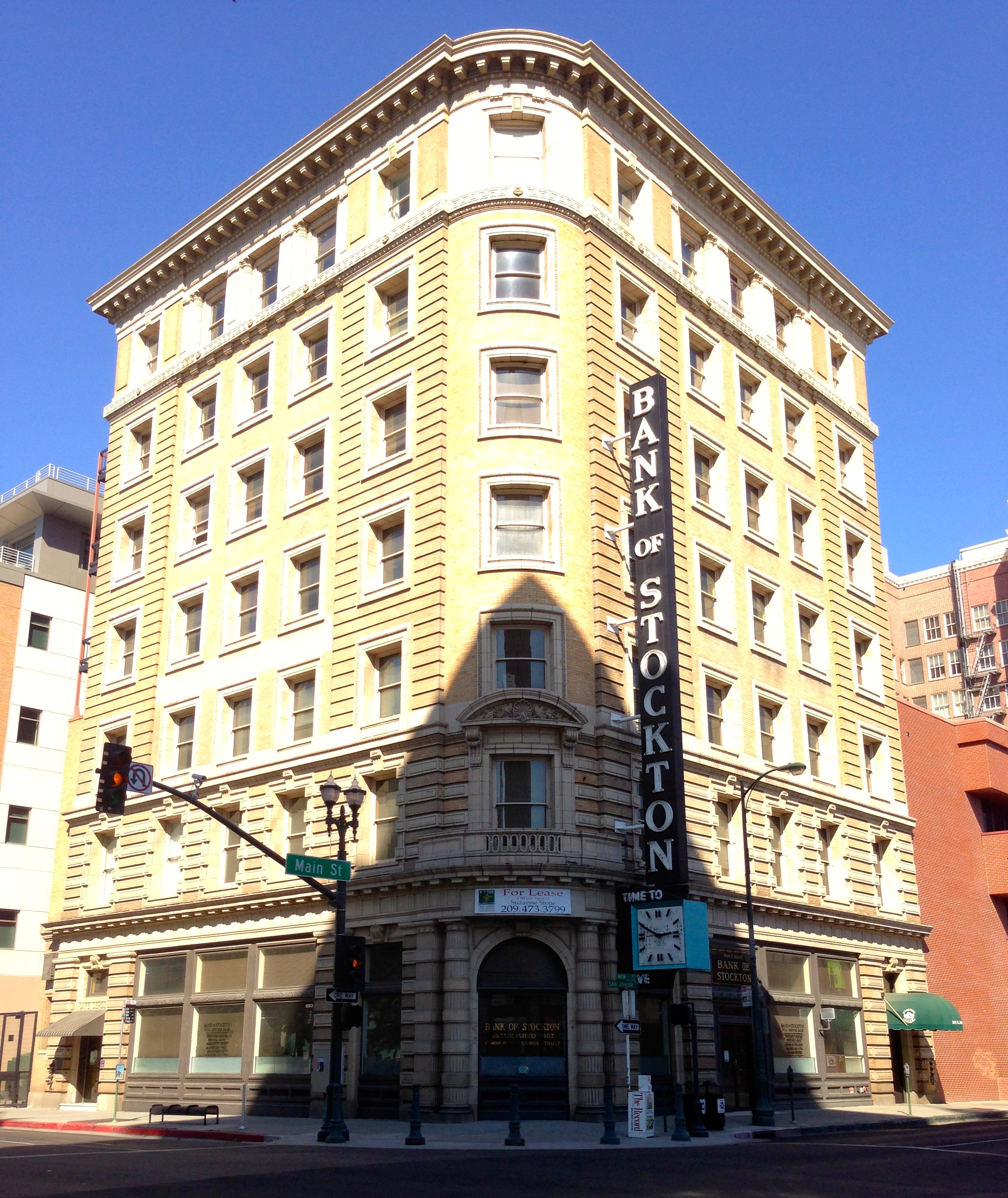
Bank of Stockton, Stockton, California

Bank of Stockton is a community bank founded in 1867 and headquartered in Stockton, California. This 150+ year old bank is one of the largest community banks in San Joaquin County. Bank of Stockton has 20 branches, in 16 cities, throughout 9 counties in contiguous markets in Northern California. Bank of Stockton is California's oldest bank still operating under its original charter.

== Founders ==
On August 12, 1867, a Certificate of Incorporation of the Stockton Savings and Loan Society (Bank of Stockton's original name) was filed with the San Joaquin County clerk. It was only two years after the Civil War, and the first group of organizers, 29 in number, met at the office of the Union Copper Mining Company, in Stockton, California. The following gentlemen were Incorporators: P. E. Connor, O. M. Clayes, R. B. Lane, H. H. Hewlett, James Littlehale, E. Conklin, Chas. Belding, J. McMullen, J. B. Webster, Wm. Fogarty, A. W. Simpson, L. U. Shippee, James Taylor, H. B. Underhill, R. B. Smith, L. Howard, J. M. Kelsey, John Sedgwick, Samuel Miller, H. Dohrman, W. P. Miller, E. S. Pillsbury, Andrew McShane, B. W. Bours, Chas G. Hubner, L. M. Hickman, L. L. Howland, Timothy Paige and Thomas Volland. These 29 men were inspired to band together to provide the people of Stockton with order and strength for their financial needs. They pledged to raise $100,000 in U.S. gold coins with which to start the bank.

J. M. Kelsey was elected to serve as the first president. At that time, Mr. Kelsey was the San Joaquin County Treasurer and Tax Collector. He was also an officer of the Union Copper Mining Company. James Littlehale, the bank's first cashier, was a city treasurer from 1866 to 1874, operated a successful produce brokerage and was the secretary-treasurer at the Union Copper Mining Company. B. W. Bours came from a pioneer land and banking family in Stockton. L. U. Shippee, who later became the bank's second president, was a major land owner in the county. Andrew W. Simpson was on the first board of directors and served as a vice president for 54 years, from 1867 to 1921. Mr. Simpson came to Stockton in November 1851 and secured work in the lumber business with his brother. He was a member of the Weber Fire Engine Company and was a delegate to the Republican National Convention in Chicago in 1888. He was succeeded by his son Andrew W. Simpson Jr., and at his death in 1945, Andrew Simpson III was elected to the board. In 1868, another well-known local resident, Charles Haas joined the board. He served until 1911 and his son Charles J. Haas served until 1915. Charles Haas’ grandson, R. Raymond Haas, served as a director from 1937 to 1966. The men who founded the bank were self-made businessmen and well-respected community leaders.

== Early years ==
The first location of the Bank of Stockton was shared with the Union Copper Mining Company and the rent was a mere $41 per month. When bank business began on September 20, 1867, the bank's founders had so much faith in the community and its people that they actually loaned money before the first deposit came in. The first loan of $1,000 was made and the following day the first commercial deposit was made by Jones, Hewlett & Sons. H. H. Hewlett was an owner of this business, as well as an original founder and director of the Bank of Stockton. He was known as one of the most successful bankers on the Pacific Coast. Within the first 24 days of operation, the bank had $100,000 worth of business. A large part of the early acceptance of the bank was due to the reputation of the men who were its founders.

The leading principles by which the bank operated had a great deal of meaning to depositors. A document, entitled "An Agreement with Depositors" pledged that the bank's board of directors would use deposits to make loans and investments, but always with the safety of depositors to come before the profit of the corporation.

In 1875, Bank business had increased to the point where the original office was too small to provide sufficient service; consequently a ten-year lease was signed on December 30, 1875, for the rental of the McKee Building at the southwest corner of Hunter and Main. On February 1, 1876, the first meeting was held in the "New Banking House." President Kelsey died on January 29, 1877, and on February 6, 1877, L. U. Shippee was elected president. Mr. Shippee served for a 16 years until 1893 and was responsible for bringing the first State Fair of California to Stockton. Fred M. West was elected secretary in 1880 and later became president in 1893. President Fred West build upon the tradition of the Bank of Stockton's commitment to the community. West, also a county treasurer, played a major role in bringing both the Santa Fe and Western Pacific Railroads to Stockton and was the first president of the Stockton Chamber of Commerce.

On December 2, 1903, the bank purchased the "Arcade Property" on the northeast corner of Main and San Joaquin for $75,000. On July 17, 1906, a special Meeting of the Stockholders authorized the expenditure of $250,000 to build a new bank. This new home for the Bank of Stockton was constructed on the northeast corner of Main and San Joaquin Street. "Stockton’s First Skyscraper" graced the paper as headlines, and it was the new Bank of Stockton that the community was talking about.

The early years of the Bank of Stockton concluded with a span of father-son leadership. R.E. Wilhoit, elected to the board in 1894, succeeded Fred M. West as president in September 1909. Having served his community as a county supervisor, recorder, city council president and board of education president, R. E. Wilhoit exemplified the Bank of Stockton's philosophy of community involvement. In 1917, R.E. Wilhoit's son, Eugene L. Wilhoit took over as president and served until 1949. Eugene not only maintained, but augmented the prestige of the Wilhoit name in financial circles. When the Bank of Stockton was frequently referred to as the "Wilhoit Bank" it carried with it a ring of confidence and assurance to depositors and stockholders alike.

The Bank of Stockton and Eugene Wilhoit were instrumental in bringing University of the Pacific (United States) to Stockton. In the early 1920s, Tully C. Knoles came to Stockton, with the purpose of arranging to move a small college to the Stockton area from San Jose, California. Tully called on Eugene Wilhoit, who had been a graduate of the College of Pacific on the San Jose campus and in 1922, was elected to C.O.P.'s board of regents. In 1924, Eugene Wilhoit and Tully Knoles formed a committee to help raise money to relocate the university from San Jose to Stockton. Once here, one of the first things the college needed was financial assistance, and Wilhoit strongly approved it. This enabled the College of Pacific, now the University of the Pacific, to move to Stockton.

== Growth and Change ==
In 1949, R. L. Eberhardt became the sixth president of the Bank of Stockton. He graduated from the University of California in 1923 with a Bachelor of Science degree. He served in the U.S. Army, American Expeditionary Forces in WWI and became a master sergeant with numerous military honors. With experience as an accountant with Irvine & Muir Lumber Company in Willits, California, and experience as assistant cashier with Bank of Willits, he became a state bank examiner for the California State Banking Department. In 1927, he came to the Bank of Stockton as assistant vice president and cashier. At that time, the bank's assets totaled $9,000,000. In 1931, he became vice president and in 1936, he was elected to the position of executive vice president. He served in that position until 1949, when he was elected president of the bank. R.L. was active in Civic Affairs, as shown by his many years on the Port Commission and County Fair Board. He also served as president of the California Bankers Association and was a long time Regent of the University of the Pacific. Much of the bank's growth took place in the 36 years that he was associated with it. His crowning achievement was the bank's new headquarters office, completed in 1960, on the corner of Miner and San Joaquin Streets in Stockton. Thousands of people came to see "the most modern banking facility in the state." R. L. Eberhardt served as president until 1963, when his son, Robert (Bob) Eberhardt, was named president.

Bob graduated from the University of the Pacific in Stockton. After finishing his secondary education at the New Mexico Military Institute, Bob enrolled at UOP, where he played football. Midway through the season, he was called by the Air Force to serve in the Azores and France. In 1952, Bob joined the California State Banking Department as an examiner. He remained an examiner until 1956, when he began working at the Bank of Stockton. In 1958, he was named to the board of directors, and in 1959, he was appointed vice president and worked alongside his father. In 1963, following his father's death, he took the helm as president of Bank of Stockton, as well as president of the Independent Bankers Association of Northern California. That same year, he succeeded his father as a member of the board of regents at UOP. In 1969, at the age of 42, Robert M. Eberhardt became one of the youngest presidents of the California Bankers Association. As chairman of the Bankers Responsible Government Committee, he helped bring community banks together to give them a voice in legislation in order to compete with larger national banks.

In 1968, President Eberhardt negotiated with Bessie Carson Gunton, the daughter of one of the bank's original depositors, William McKendree Carson, for the purchase of land formerly owned by her father, where Pacific Avenue and Benjamin Holt Drive in Stockton are located today. This piece of land was purchased for the purpose of the bank's first "Branch Office." The Carson Oaks Office opened in 1970.

The 1980s saw even more growth for the bank, with the acquisition of Mid-Cal National Bank. The four new locations gave Bank of Stockton immediate branch representation throughout San Joaquin County with branches in Lodi, California, Tracy, California, Manteca, California, and Pine Grove, Amador County, California. On September 16, 1990, the bank's Quail Lakes Delta Office opened in Stockton. Slow, cautious growth has been a tradition for Bank of Stockton.

In May 1990, the opportunity arose for the bank to acquire the deposits of Royal Oaks Savings and Loan. This acquisition created a new Ripon branch location for Bank of Stockton.

In 1993, Bank of Stockton became the first bank on the west coast to introduce the then-innovative "Image Check System" which replaced cancelled checks with reduced images of checks.

In 1990, Bob Eberhardt acquired the photograph collection of late Stockton photographer, Leonard Covello, with the purpose of preserving local history. The Bank of Stockton had many historic items and photos of its own in an existing collection. The Covello Collection, which dated back to 1850 and consisted of more than 21,000 historical images from the Central Valley (California), the Mother Lode and surrounding communities, was an opportunity that Eberhardt could not pass up. The entire collection is now scanned into a visual database. Since then, the Collection has grown to over 40,000 photographs.

In the fall of 1994, President Robert M. Eberhardt died. The legacy of leadership, commitment and determination that Robert M. Eberhardt left behind continues to serve as a major component of Bank of Stockton's strength.

The tradition of family leadership continued when Douglass M. Eberhardt took his seat as the bank's eighth president, pledging his commitment to the traditions and philosophies that made Bank of Stockton a success for well over century.

Douglass Eberhardt graduated from the College of the Pacific in 1959 with a major in business administration and a minor in economics. He is a 1966 graduate of the University of Washington Pacific Coast Banking School and a 1974 graduate cum laude of the School for Bank Administration, majoring in Controllership. He also served in the U.S. Army Reserves, Armor Corps. Eberhardt has served on University of the Pacific's board of regents and has been very involved in the progress and growth of the university's Eberhardt School of Business, named after the Eberhardt family in June 1997. Like his brother and father before him, Doug's involvement in the community included seats on numerous boards and affiliations.

Eberhardt also saw opportunity in response to a growing customer base in the Manteca, California area, and built a new, larger Manteca office in the fall of 1997. On December 5, 1997, Bank of Stockton officially acquired three Bank of America branches, giving the bank representation in the new markets of Angels Camp in Calaveras County, and Rio Vista, California in Solano County. The acquisition included a large B of A office in Ripon, California that was soon remodeled and became the bank's main Ripon location. Marking another milestone in the bank's history, Bank of Stockton became the first community bank headquartered in the Central Valley to reach more than $1 billion in assets in May 1999.

In February 2003, Bank of Stockton opened a new branch in the City of Oakdale, California. The following fall, the bank acquired Modesto Commerce Bank and Turlock Commerce Bank as Divisions of Bank of Stockton. The additional branches added over $330 million in assets and increased the bank's assets to approximately $1.75 billion. The acquisition expanded the bank's branch network into Stanislaus County. On December 21, 2006, Elk Grove Commerce Bank, a Division of Bank of Stockton, opened its doors. On August 25, 2008, to better serve the growing customer base in Modesto, California, the Modesto Commerce Bank division opened its Dale Road branch. On March 1, 2009, Bank of Stockton announced its plans to purchase the Sonora, California Branch of Wachovia Bank. In the fall of 2015, the bank acquired three new branches of First Bank, located in Brentwood, California, Napa, California, and Fairfield, California. This acquisition increased the bank's assets to $2.4 billion and gave the bank representation in Contra Costa County and Napa county with a second branch in Solano County.

In 2015, Douglass Eberhardt II was elected 9th president of the Bank of Stockton, with Doug Sr. continuing as CEO and chairman of the board. The younger Eberhardt was previously executive vice president working closely with his father for over twenty years. Douglass II is a 1989 business graduate of University of the Pacific. Douglass is the 4th Eberhardt in the bank's history to be named to the position of president, preceded by his father, Douglass, his uncle Robert, and his grandfather, R.L. Eberhardt. He is the 9th president in the bank's history of 150 years, continuing the span of Eberhardt leadership.

In July 2016, the bank decided to consolidate the names of its Divisions, Modesto Commerce Bank, Turlock Commerce Bank and Elk Grove Commerce Bank, into Bank of Stockton.
