= Alameda and San Joaquin Railroad =

Train company in Northern California

Overview
- Headquarters: Stockton, California
- Locale: Tracy, California
- Dates of operation: 1895–1903

Technical
- Track gauge: 4 ft 8 1/2 in (1,435 mm) standard gauge

The Alameda and San Joaquin Railroad was incorporated on May 1, 1895, to serve the coal mines of the San Francisco & San Joaquin Coal Company at Corral Hollow. The 36.6-mile (58.9 km) line ran from Tesla (located in the Corral Hollow canyon southeast of Corral Hollow Pass) to Carbona just south of Tracy and then up to Lathrop and Stockton. The line was constructed in 1895. On July 25, 1903, the line was sold to the Western Pacific Railway (WP).

== Route ==
The line from Tesla to Carbona was abandoned by the WP in January 1916, however an April 1916 timetable continued to show that line.

- Tesla (Corral Hollow)
- Harrietville
- Walden Pottery
- Carnegie
- Manganese
- River Rock
- Kerlinger
- Carbona (near present-day Union Pacific CP F072)

The remainder of the line from Carbona to Stockton became the WP's mainline route (today's Union Pacific's Oakland Subdivision) from Tracy to Stockton.

- Carbona
- Tracy (CP F074)
- Lyoth (CP F075)
- Wyche (CP F082/F083)
- Lathrop (CP F084/F087) Sharpe Army Depot
- French Camp
- Ortega (CP F090)
- Stockton Yard (CP F091/F092)
- Stockton Tower (CP F093)
