= Mount Wallace (Diablo Range) =

Mountain in the American state of California

- Location within California

Highest point
- Elevation: 3,107 ft (947 m)
- Prominence: 392 ft (119 m)
- Coordinates: 37°32′21.37″N 121°33′0.90″W

Geography
- Location: Alameda County, San Joaquin County, California, United States
- Parent range: Diablo Range
- Topo map: USGS Cedar Mountain

Mount Wallace is a summit in the Diablo Range, in Alameda County, California. Mount Wallace rises to and elevation of 3,091 feet (942 meters).
