= John Treadwell (miner) =

Canadian gold miner

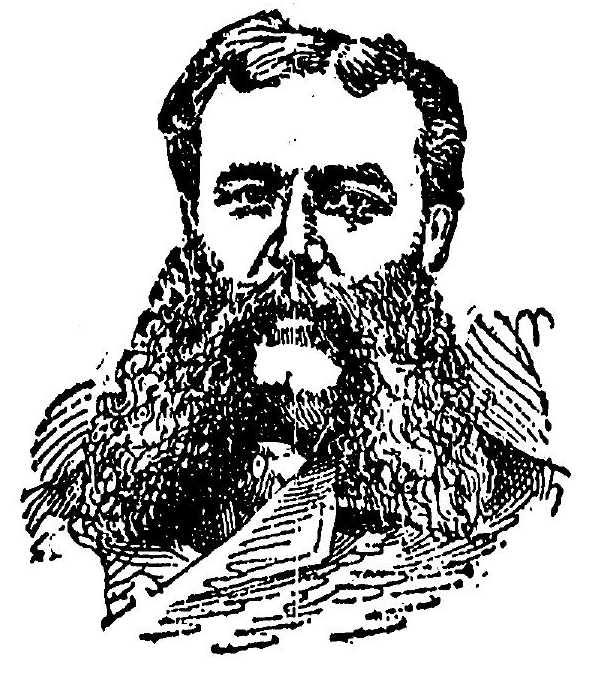
- Born: 1842; St. Andrews, New Brunswick, British North America
- Died: November 6, 1927 (aged 84–85); New York City, US
- Citizenship: Canada
- Occupation: Miner
- Known for: his mines formed the largest complex in the world at the time
- Spouse: Frederika Josephine Graner

John Treadwell (1842–1927) was a Canadian gold miner. He was born in St. Andrews, New Brunswick, Canada. He owned and operated the Treadwell gold mine through the Treadwell Mining Company. He was responsible for initiating low-grade gold mining in Alaska adopting most advanced operations on a big scale, which boosted the economy of the wilderness areas. His four mines formed the largest complex in the world at that time. Treadwell's mine complex "put Juneau on the map".

== Personal life ==
Treadwell was born in St. Andrews. He had a brother, James. He married Frederika Josephine Graner in 1889.

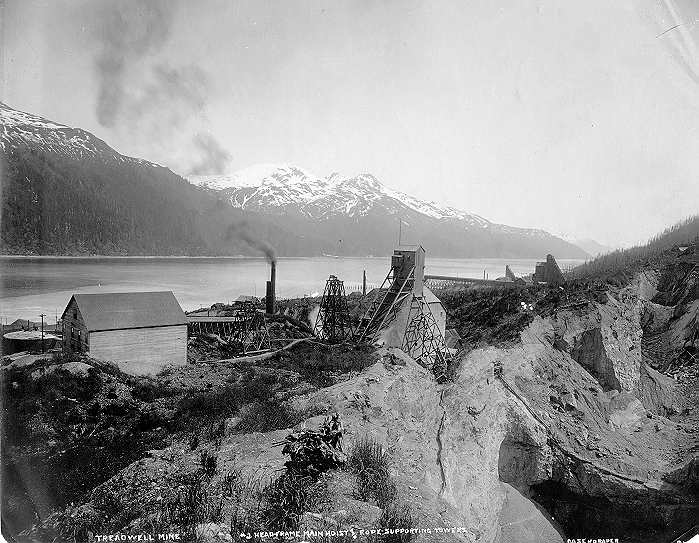
Treadwell Mine in the 1890s

== Career ==
Treadwell worked as a miner in California and Nevada. In 1881, he worked as a carpenter on a house in California for John Fry, a well known banker. When Fry heard about the rich gold exploring possibility around the Gastineau Channel on Douglas Island, near Alaska's current capital of Juneau, he proposed Treadwell to inspect the area and find out the scope of prospecting there as Treadwell had a mining background. Initially, Treadwell met a French miner, Pierre Joseph Erussard, who gave very encouraging reports of the gold deposits in his claim. As Erussard was short of funds to carry out further work, he decided to return to his country, and Treadwell gave Erussard $400 for the Paris lode claim. On Treadwell's return to California, he, Fry, and another friend established a mining company to work on Alaskan mine claims. The Alaska Mill and Mining Company was established in May 1882. Explorations on an experimental basis included a five-stamp mill. The results proved profitable and the company expanded with a bigger sized 120-stamp mill in 1883 and another in 1887. In the initial years, the Treadwell Complex had four mines (Treadwell, Ready Bullion, the Mexican and the Seven-Hundred-Foot) and five mills. The gold yield was worth about US$70 million.

In 1889, Treadwell sold his mining operations to the Alaska Gold Mining Company for a reported $1.5 million. By 1914, Treadwell Complex mining operations attained a world record with 960 stamps crushing 5,000 tons of rock per day. Treadwell ventured into coal mining in California which turned out be a failure; he owned and operated the Tesla Coal Mine established in the now defunct mining town of Tesla and named in 1897 for Nikola Tesla, whom Treadwell hoped to sell coal to for electrical generation. The former town and mine are now situated in the Carnegie State Vehicular Recreation Area. Consequently, he was associated with banking in New York with his brother James, which resulted in a bankruptcy claim of US$3 million without any supporting collateral. He died in New York on November 6, 1927, and was buried there.
