= Mount Boardman =

Peak in the Diablo Range, California

- Location within California

Highest point
- Elevation: 3,621 ft (1,104 m) NAVD 88
- Prominence: 98 ft (30 m)
- Listing: California county high points 49th
- Coordinates: 37°28′52″N 121°28′19″W

Geography
- Location: San Joaquin and Stanislaus counties, California, U.S.
- Parent range: Diablo Range
- Topo map: USGS Mount Boardman

Mount Boardman is located in the Diablo Range in California. The summit is near a point where Santa Clara, Alameda, Stanislaus, and San Joaquin counties meet. It was named for W. F. Boardman, the Alameda County surveyor between 1865 and 1869.

There is a higher peak to the north which is unofficially called Boardman North and has an elevation of 3,629 feet (1,106 m). This north peak, unnamed on topographic maps, is located on the Alameda – San Joaquin county line, and is the highest point in San Joaquin County. Some snow falls on both peaks during the winter.

== See also ==
- List of highest points in California by county
