= Naval Auxiliary Air Station Vernalis =

Former base in California

Coordinates: 37.6°N 121.316°W

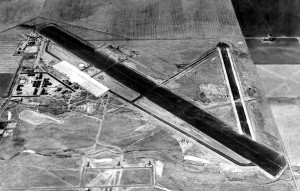
Naval Auxiliary Air Station Vernalis looking south, showing 7000-foot and 4000-foot runways. Koster and Gaffery Roads intersect near the upper-right corner.

Naval Auxiliary Air Station Vernalis was a United States Navy facility located in the small town of Vernalis, California during World War II. It opened on June 8, 1943, and closed on October 15, 1945.

== History ==
It served as an auxiliary station to Naval Air Station Alameda. It also housed German prisoners of war during World War II. The site is located northeast of the intersection of Gaffery Road and Koster Road. The Navy used the 160 acre Vernalis Bombing Target, located roughly 4.4 miles southwest of the Air Station, as a dive bombing range. The air base also supported the nearby Hammond General Hospital. On the 4000-foot runway, Seabees installed a catapult and arresting gear for aircraft carrier training. For strafing training, a range was made on the Diablo Range with a silhouette of a submarine painted on rocks.

The site came to life again in the 1950s; the US Air Force used it as the Vernalis Geophysics Annex, operated with the Cambridge Research Laboratory. It was used with other Annex bases in the Air Force's Project Moby Dick, to test high altitude wind patterns. From the Annex, stratospheric balloons were launched and tracked by a network of radio receiving stations across the US. The site was again abandoned in the 1960s. In the 1970s it became a drag strip. In the 1980s and later it was used for scrap metal, scrap wood processing, and fertilizer manufacturing businesses.

== See also ==
- California during World War II
- American Theater (1939–1945)
- Desert Training Center
- United States home front during World War II
