= San Joaquin City, California =

Former Gold Rush era river port

Coordinates: 37°40′12″N 121°15′58″W

San Joaquin City
- Former settlement
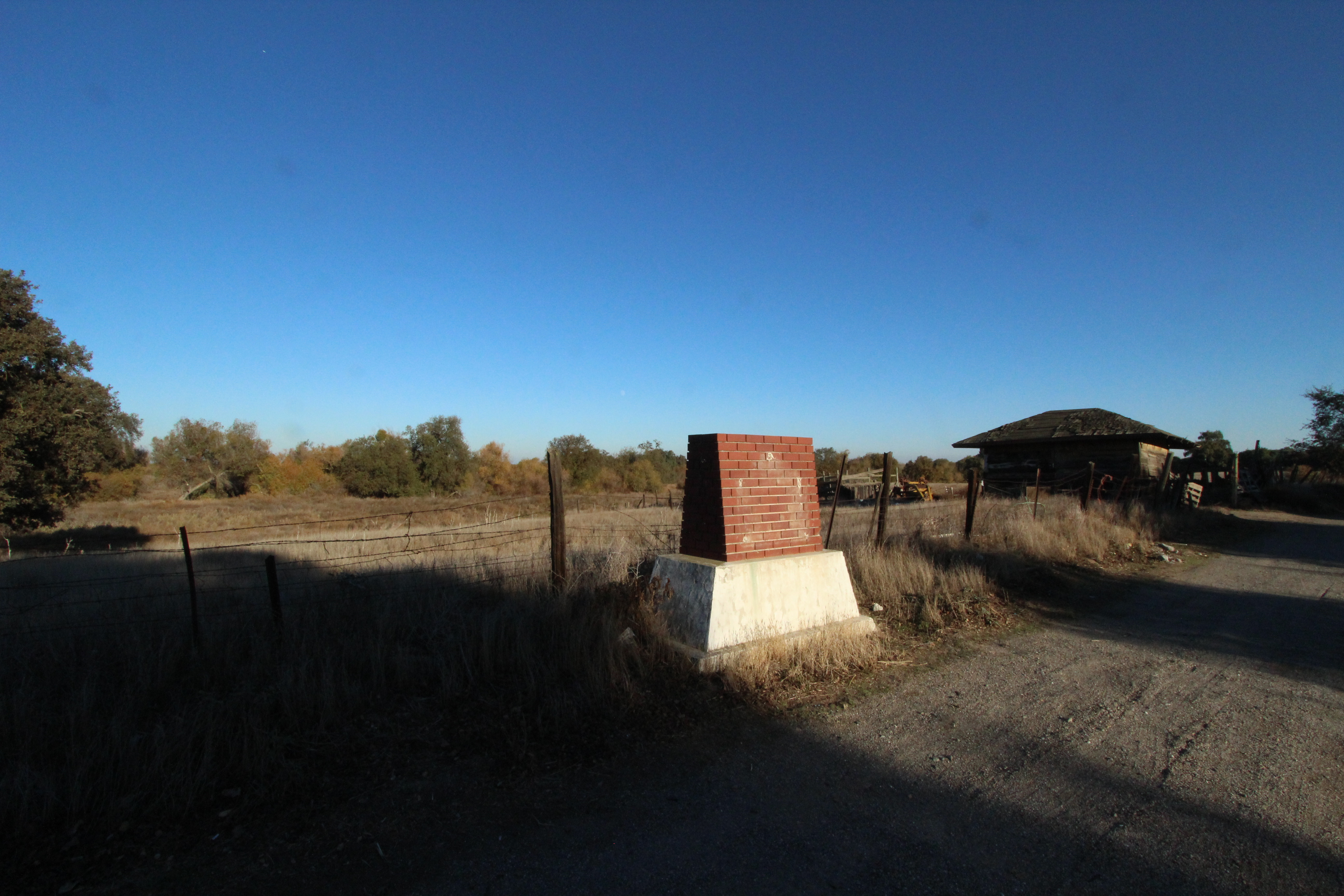
- Interactive map of San Joaquin City
- Country: United States
- State: California
- County: San Joaquin County
- Settled: 1849
- Elevation: 43 ft (13 m)

California Historical Landmark
- Reference no.: 777

San Joaquin City (Spanish: San Joaquín, meaning "St. Joachim") is a former settlement in San Joaquin County, California. It was established in 1849, during the California Gold Rush. It was located on the west bank of the San Joaquin River just below the point where Airport Way (formerly Durham Ferry Road) crosses the river today. It was an important settlement along the old River Road (now Kasson Road in San Joaquin County) between Banta and Grayson's Ferry (now the community of Grayson in Stanislaus County.

== History ==
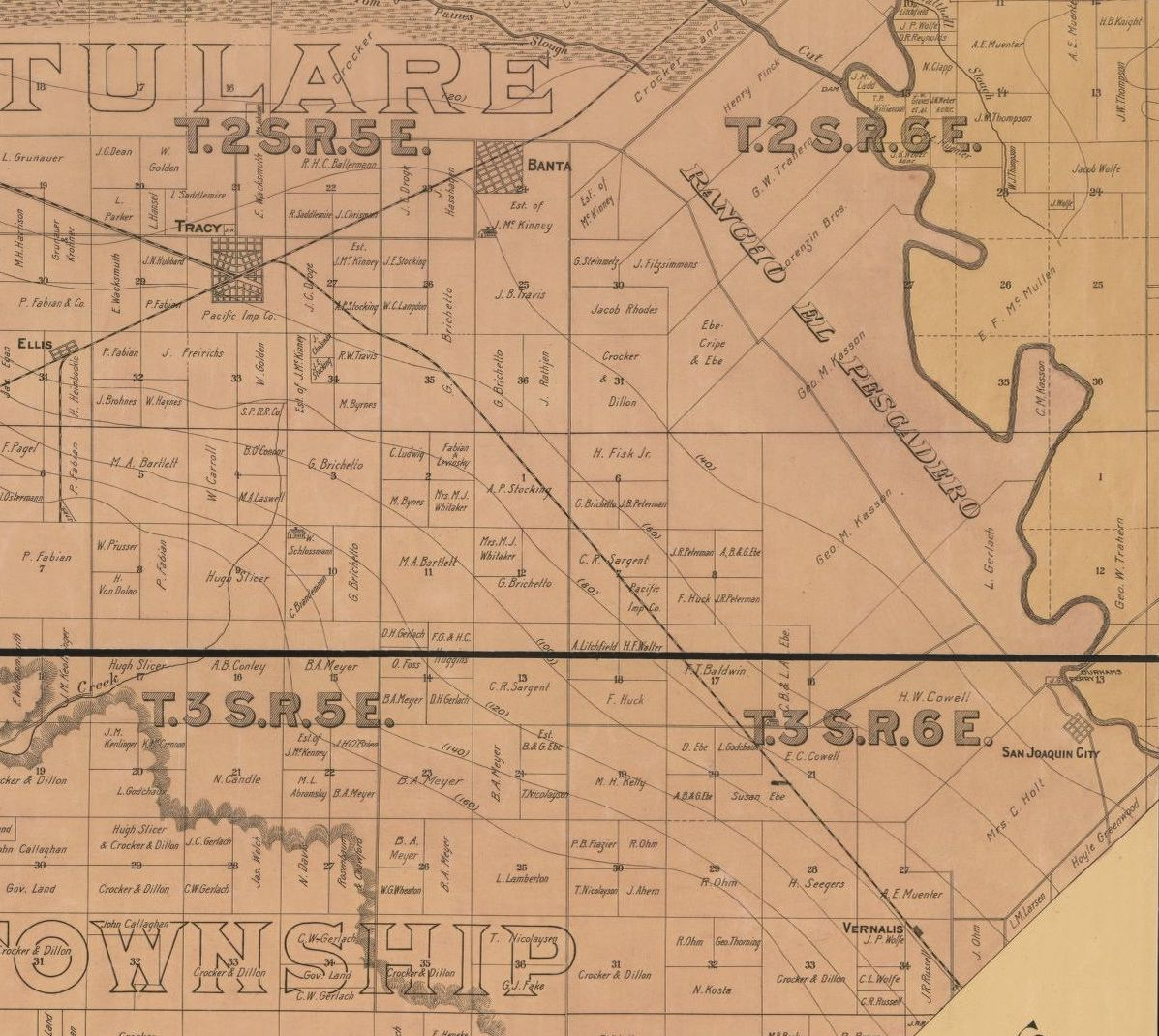
1895 map of a portion of southern San Joaquin County, showing San Joaquin City and nearby landmarks, including Durham's Ferry and the settlements of Vernalis, Tracy, and Banta

San Joaquin City was a river town established in 1849, on high ground by the San Joaquin River. Pioneers and freight wagons following post roads to the Southern Mines crossed the San Joaquin River nearby at Durham's Ferry, and as the crossroads point for riverboat and overland traffic, the town played an important part in development of the west side of San Joaquin Valley grain farming and cattle raising. It became a popular trading outpost, and was said to be a rival to nearby Stockton.

In 1879, the Central Pacific Railroad opened rail service from Martinez to Fresno, reducing the importance of river traffic to the western Central Valley. Before the turn of the 20th century, the upstream portion of the San Joaquin River was increasingly being diverted for irrigation, making the river downstream less navigable. By the 1890s, the land the city was situated on was being bought by private individuals and returned to farm use. Finally, flooding in 1911 cut new channels for the river, making its navigation almost impossible to maintain, and was considered to be "the final blow to the hopes and aspirations of San Joaquin City."

The San Joaquin City post office, the first post office in the area, opened in 1851; it closed in 1852, and reopened in 1874. In 1888, it was moved 3 miles (4.8 km) southwest to Vernalis, along the Southern Pacific rail line.

The site of the former city is located on Kasson Road, in Tracy, California.

== Historical Landmark plaque ==
It is marked by California Historical Landmark 777, placed in 1962. The original fifty-pound bronze plaque was reported stolen in October 2005.

By August 2017, the plaque had been replaced by a wooden plaque with a paper copy of the original bronze plaque attached to it. The paper plaque read:

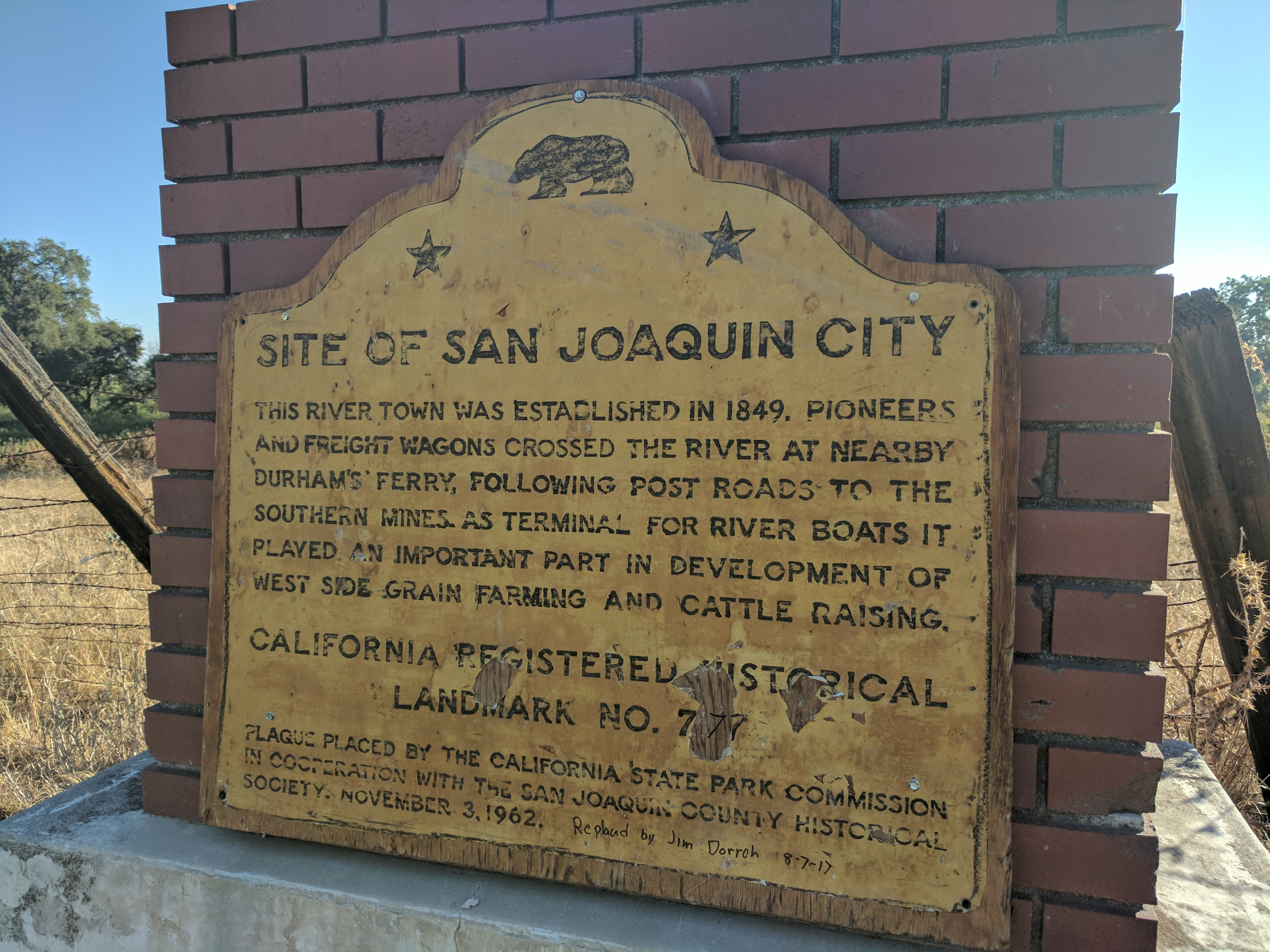
California Historical Landmark No. 777 - San Joaquin City, wood/paper substitute for stolen plaque

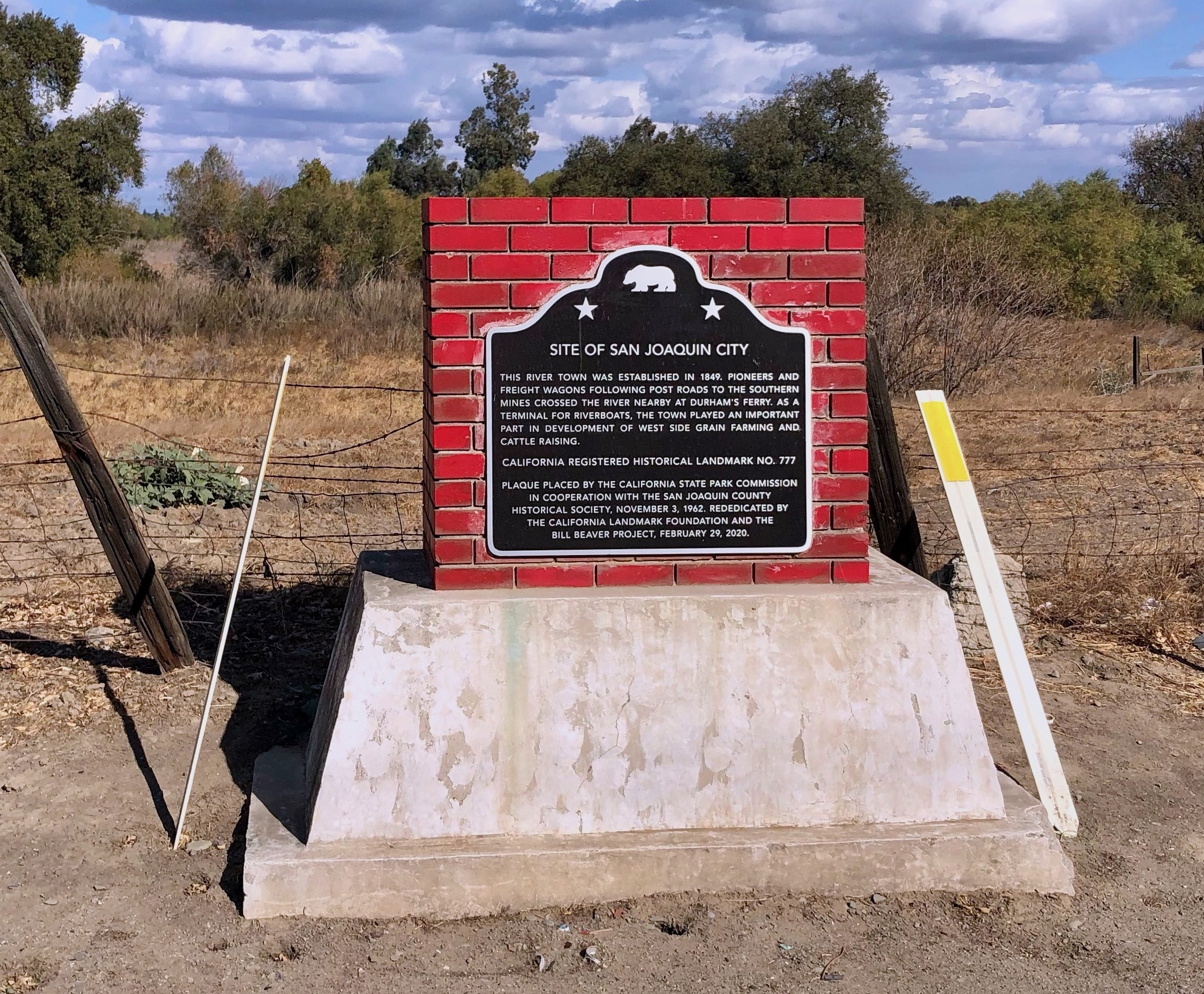
California Historical Landmark No. 777, 2020

Site of San Joaquin City

This river town was established in 1849. Pioneers and freight wagons crossed the river at nearby Durham's Ferry, following post roads to the southern mines. As a terminal for river boats it played an important part in development of west side grain farming and cattle raising.

California Registered Historical Landmark No. 777

Plaque placed by the California State Park Commission in cooperation with the San Joaquin County Historical Society, November 3, 1962.

A hand-written inscription at the bottom of the plaque read: "Replaced by Jim Dorroh 8-17-17"

In February 2020, a new aluminum plaque was installed, with minor changes to the wording.

== See also ==
- List of ghost towns in California
