= Carnegie State Vehicular Recreation Area =

State park in California

- Location within California Location within the United States
- Location: Alameda and San Joaquin Counties, California, United States
- Nearest city: Tracy, California
- Coordinates: 37°37′24″N 121°29′29″W
- Area: 5,075 acres (2,054 ha)
- Established: 1979
- Governing body: California Department of Parks and Recreation

Carnegie State Vehicular Recreation Area is a state park unit of California, U.S., providing off-roading opportunities in the Diablo Range. Located in southern Alameda and San Joaquin counties, it is one of eight state vehicular recreation areas (SVRAs) administered by the California Department of Parks and Recreation. With a diversity of terrain ranging from rolling hills to steep canyons, Carnegie has become a popular destination for off-road enthusiasts of all skill levels.

== Carnegie Brick and Pottery ==
In 1855 surveyors for a railroad found coal in Corral Hollow. Later miners discovered that the canyon contained rich deposits of coal and clay. Fueled by California's rapid population growth and the subsequent demand for building materials, the Carnegie Brick and Pottery Company, named after Andrew Carnegie, was formed in 1902.

By 1904, Carnegie, California, a vibrant town with 350 inhabitants was in place, and the town's brick factory was producing upwards of 100,000 bricks per day.

The brick and terracotta used in the construction of the Stockton Savings and Loan Society Bank were made at the Carnegie Brick and Pottery Plant and is an example of a building constructed entirely of clay products from Carnegie. The Carnegie site has been designated California Historical Landmarks in San Joaquin County #740.

Despite high demand for brick, floods and boiler explosions brought the company to financial ruin and it was sold in 1916. The new owners, in an effort to reduce competition, sold off the factory's equipment and destroyed what remained of the town's buildings. The town of Carnegie was now a memory. Remnants of Carnegie's past are still evident in the plant's foundations east of the ATV track.

== State Vehicular Recreation Area ==
For years the area supported a large cattle grazing operation and also became a popular picnic destination for residents of Livermore and Tracy. People began riding off-road in the 1930s and '40s and races were held in the 1950s. During the 1960s, the privately owned Carnegie Cycle Park was established, providing a setting for motorcyclists to test their off-road skills. Finally, as off-road recreation gained popularity, Carnegie was purchased by the state in 1979 with OHV Trust Fund monies to create the present-day Carnegie SVRA.

=== Terrain and facilities ===
With over 1,500 acres (610 ha) of riding area, Carnegie offers a variety of terrain upon which to ride. Characterized by dry rocky washes, rolling hills and steep, rugged canyons, the park provides a setting for off-highway vehicle users of all skill levels.

Day-use hours vary depending upon the time of year but generally range from 8 a.m. to sunset. Twenty-three campsites are available on a first-come, first-served basis. Ramadas, fire rings, restrooms and water faucets are provided for campers. Water and electrical hook-ups are not available. Picnic tables are located throughout the valley floor. Fires are restricted to the fire rings provided in the campground.

The following facilities are operated by park staff and are open to the public unless a special event is scheduled:

- Motocross track — this popular track is open to motorcycles only. Formalized competitive events are held on some weekends causing periodic closures to the public.
- ATV/MC Track — open to both ATVs and motorcycles.
- 70cc Children's Track — designated for motorcycles and ATVs with small engines up to 70cc displacement, the track offers young riders an opportunity to practice and improve their riding skills.
- 110cc Beginner Track — designated for motorcycles and ATVs with small engines up to 110cc displacement, the track offers young riders an opportunity to practice and improve their riding skills.

=== Vegetation and wildlife ===
Carnegie SVRA is home to a wide range of plant and animal life. Those who take the time to explore will see raptors soaring gracefully above, countless tracks of small mammals and insects, and an impressive, colorful display of spring wildflowers. Look up and you might catch a glimpse of a red-tailed hawk, kestrel or golden eagle flying overhead, searching the grassland below for its next meal. Wow.

Black-tailed deer are often seen feeding in the mornings and evenings, and coyote sightings are common. Tule elk, introduced to the Diablo Range in the late 1970s, can provide a special thrill for visitors who happen upon these large animals grazing in the park or on adjacent ranch land. Feral pigs, wild turkeys, bobcats and badgers are just a few of the other animals that make Corral Hollow Canyon their home.

The vegetation in the park is fragile. Familiar plants native to the park include blue oak, gray pine, California poppies, California buckeye and the ever-present poison oak. Similar to most grasslands in California, many of the grasses in the park and the surrounding lands are non-native and were introduced during the many years of ranching and farming. However, Carnegie does have some beautiful stands of native bunchgrasses.

=== Resource management ===
Consistent with the Off-Highway Motor Vehicle Act of 1988, the condition of soils, wildlife and vegetative resources are continually monitored by park staff to determine if soil loss standards and habitat protection plans are being met. Through this monitoring process, changes (such as erosion or wildlife population variations) can be detected and the appropriate action can be taken to mitigate problems. Consequently, from time to time, certain trails or hill climb areas may be fenced off or closed in an effort to protect wildlife and restore habitat. These closed areas are often replanted with native plant species in order to repair and rehabilitate those areas damaged by recreational use.

In 1998 over 3,000 acres (1,200 ha) located west of the current riding area were purchased by the state for inclusion into Carnegie SVRA. This proposal, known as the Alameda-Tesla Expansion Project, will provide increased OHV recreational opportunities at Carnegie SVRA, possibly including an extensive multiple use (i.e., motorcycles, ATVs, 4x4 vehicles, sports utility vehicles) trail system, a 4x4 vehicle obstacle course, a day-use staging area, and interpretive and informational facilities. The project may also provide non-OHV recreational opportunities like interpretive trails, mountain biking, horseback riding and hiking, provided there is no conflict between them and OHV users. Within this area is the site of the former coal mining town of Tesla.

== See also ==
- List of California state parks
