= Corral Hollow =

Canyon in the Diablo Range, California

- El Arroyo de los Buenos Ayres
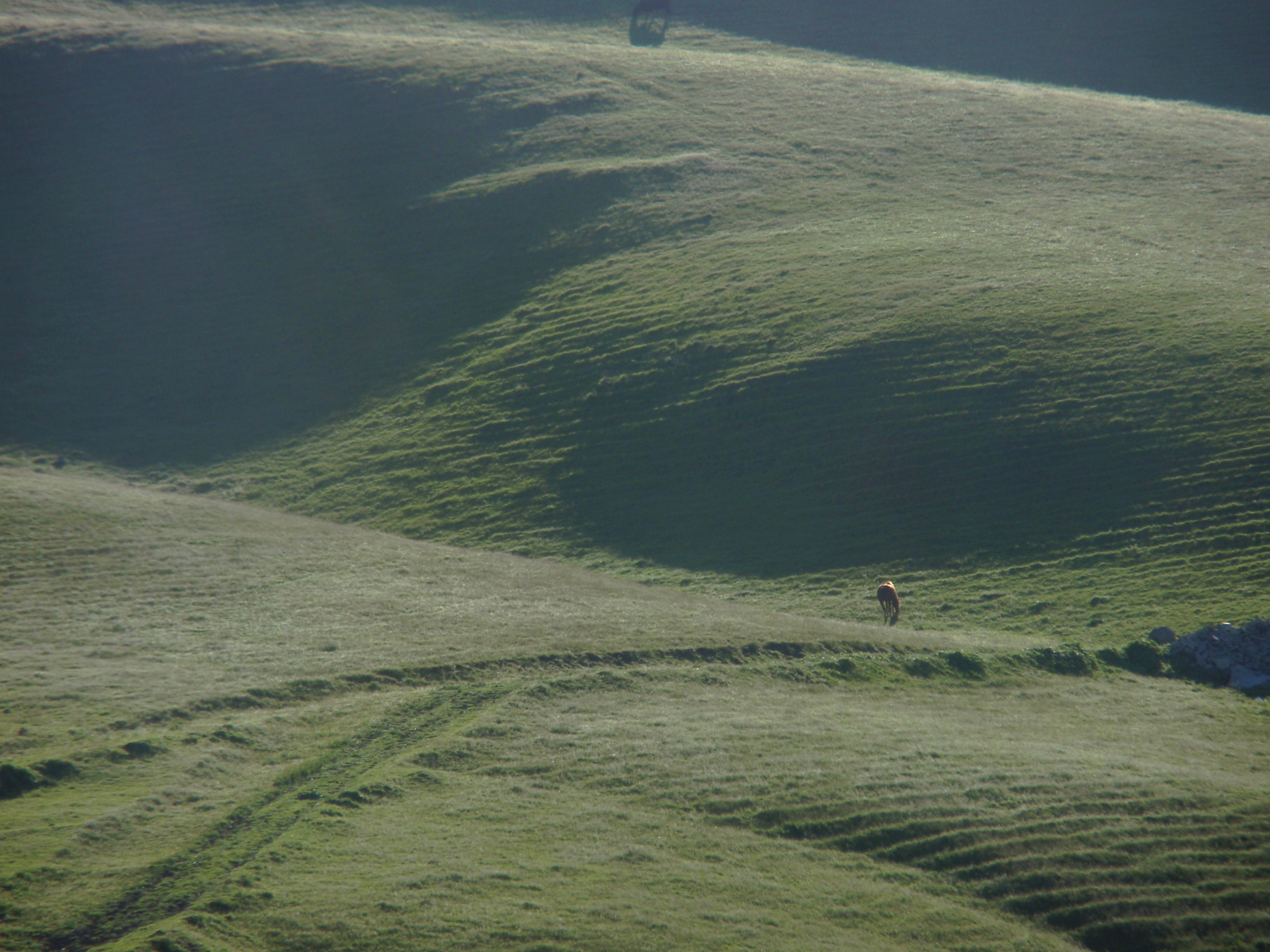
- A location in Corral Hollow

- Location within California
- Floor elevation: 122 m (400 ft)

Geography
- Location: Alameda and San Joaquin counties, California
- Coordinates: 37°39′28″N 121°28′38″W
- Traversed by: Corral Hollow Creek
- Interactive map of Corral Hollow

California Historical Landmark
- Reference no.: 755

Corral Hollow, is a 10 miles (16 km) long canyon in a middle reach of Corral Hollow Creek, which drains the eastern flank of the Diablo Range. The canyon's western half is in Alameda County, and its eastern half is in San Joaquin County. Once it is joined by its Elk Ravine tributary at elevation 400 feet (120 m), the canyon ends and Corral Hollow Creek's continue eastward ultimately to the San Joaquin River watershed.

== Etymology ==
The name of the canyon was originally El Arroyo de los Buenos Ayres, but later changed. There was a myth that the canyon's name was a corruption of "Carrell Hollow," after the early settler Edward Carrell, but this has been disproved. The name "Corral Hollow" was after a corral downstream of the Tesla area, used in the 1850s to hold wild mustangs.

== Ecology and geology ==
Corral Hollow is located at the junction of the San Joaquin Valley and the Diablo Range, an inner California Coast Range which borders it to the west. It is northernmost of a number of east-west valleys running from the Diablo Range into the San Joaquin Valley, and is the northern limit for a number of desert-adapted species of plants and animals, including glossy snakes, black-headed snakes, and spadefoot toads. Thanks to a migration between about 8,000 and 5,000 years ago, and the valley's remote location, a number of species one might expect to find in the Mojave desert live alongside the more familiar Bay Area species. Because of the habitat's rarity and proximity to the Bay Area, it has been heavily studied. Corral Hollow is also important as a wildlife corridor, leading from the Diablo Range into the San Joaquin Plain.

The trees on the slopes of the valley include ghost pine (Pinus sabiniana), bigberry manzanita (Arctostaphylos glauca), and blue oak (Quercus douglasii). Unlike the rest of California, the pines on the slopes are lower in elevation than the oaks. This is possibly because the pines, which do not have to replace their foliage, do better in the nutrient-poor bedrock. The bedrock is of quartz-rich sandstone, and is part of the Eocene Tesla Formation. The trees on the floor of the valley consist of sycamores and fremont cottonwoods, standard along streams in the area. The soil in Corral Hollow consists of river-deposited pebbles and coarse sand lying unconformably on the sandstone.

== History ==
Corral Hollow Canyon was occupied by Native Americans prior to European contact, and is within both Yokuts and Ohlone ancestral homelands. El Camino Viejo, an old Spanish colonial trail, passed through the valley, which was part of the routes of both Spanish and Mexican cattle-drivers, and gold-diggers during the Californian Gold Rush. The Spanish named Corral Hollow Creek El Arroyo de los Buenos Ayres (The Creek of the Good Winds). The canyon begins just west of the historical coal-mining town of Tesla, and includes also the clay-mining town of Carnegie, both of which were destroyed by a flood in 1911. Around 2001, the California government purchased an area of land around Tesla in order to allow off-road vehicles, which was protested by ecological organizations until the state passed a law banning that usage of the land in 2022.

=== Pre-contact ===
The site was once occupied by Native Americans and is within the ancestral homelands of the Yokuts and Ohlone peoples. Important archaeological sites, likely either Yokuts or Ohlone, show that the Tesla area was and is a sacred precinct. The creek has a significant quantity of bedrock mortars, which were used by Native Americans to grind acorns and other seeds.

=== European contact ===
The first European to pass through Coral Hollow was possibly Juan Bautista de Anza, who led a party through the valley on a side trip from a journey from San Francisco to Monterey. Accompanying him were Joaquin Murrieta, and Tiburcio Vasquez.

An old Spanish trail, El Camino Viejo, passed through the canyon. The trail was regularly used by Spanish and Mexican Vaqueros, when they drove herds of cattle through the canyon, and later served as a route to the Southern Mines during the California Gold Rush.

One of the first non-Native settlers in the canyon was Edward B. Carrell, in 1850. He and three associates built a tavern on the edge of El Camino Viejo, the trail running through the valley, called the "Zink House", which served wayfarers along the road for several years. The tavern was built 500 yards north of Carrell's home, which is California Historical Landmark.

=== Carnegie and Tesla ===
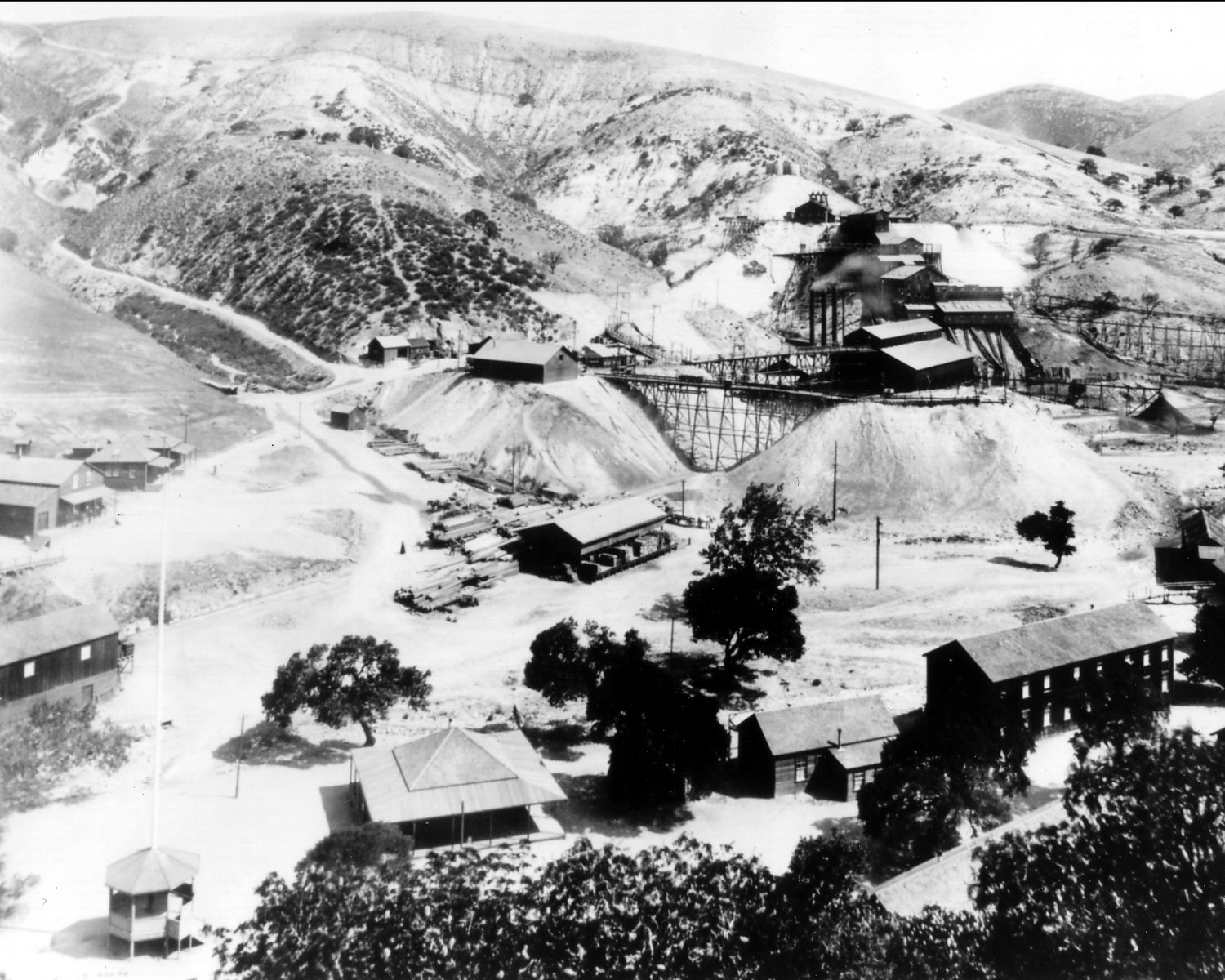
Tesla, California in black and white

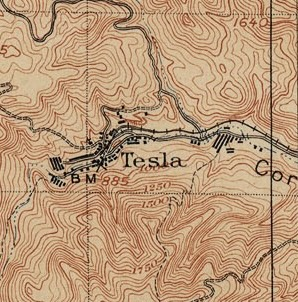
Topographic map of Tesla

Coal was first discovered in Corral Hollow in 1855. This led to the formation of a number of coal mines, including the Pacific Coal Mining Company, based on a discovery by John O'Brien, about nine miles away from the Zink House, in 1856. Edward Carrell was one of the owners of the company. It changed names several times and underwent a series of failures until, after Carrell's death in 1880, it was purchased, renamed, closed, and reopened by James and John Treadwell. It was then called the Tesla Mine, in honor of Nikola Tesla. The company averaged 500 tons of coal daily in the 1890s, and was the largest coal producing mine in California from the years 1896 to 1905. The town of Tesla, which grew around the coal mine, eventually grew to have 200 buildings and 1,500 residents. Around the 1890s the Treadwells built a large brick and pottery plant, about four miles down the gulch from Tesla, and organized as the Carnegie Brick and Pottery Company. The plant used clay extracted from Tesla to manufacture brick and pottery products, and grew to become its own town, also called Carnegie, of about 2,000 inhabitants. Both towns were abandoned in the early 1900s after a series of disasters ruined the Treadwells financially and destroyed infrastructure. The 1906 earthquake and the failure of the California Safe Deposit Bank, which backed the operation, ruined the Treadwells financially, followed by repeated flooding and boiler room explosions. Both towns were fully abandoned after a last flood in 1911, which destroyed the railroad and workings, which the company could not afford to rebuild.

=== California OHMVR purchase ===
Around 2001, the California Off-Highway Motor Vehicle Recreation Division (OHMVR) purchased a large area of land around Tesla, planning to incorporate it into the nearby Carnegie State Vehicular Recreation Area (CSVRA), which would have allowed off-road vehicles onto the property. This was protested by a number of organizations on ecological grounds, including the Sierra Club, the California Native Plant Society (CNPS), the Greenbelt Alliance, Save Mount Diablo, and the Friends of Tesla Park, a group of nearby ranchers and residents. The struggle finally ended in 2022, when the state of California included a section preventing the area from being declared a state vehicular recreation area in the Public Resources Trailer Bill of the 2021-2022 state budget. As of 2022, the Friends of Tesla Park, the Sierra Club, and the CNPS plan to push the state to classify Tesla as a natural or cultural reserve, mandating preservation as a priority for management.
