= Mabie, California =

Mabie
- Unincorporated Community; Census Designated Place
- Position in California.
- Coordinates: 39°46′48″N 120°32′28″W
- Country: United States
- State: California
- County: Plumas

Area
  - Total: 3.641 sq mi (9.430 km^{2})
  - Land: 3.641 sq mi (9.430 km^{2})
  - Water: 0 sq mi (0 km^{2}) 0%
- Elevation: 4,882 ft (1,488 m)

Population (2020)
  - Total: 181
  - Density: 49.7/sq mi (19.2/km^{2})
- Time zone: UTC-8 (Pacific (PST))
  - Summer (DST): UTC-7 (PDT)
- GNIS feature ID: 2612134

Mabie is a census-designated place in Plumas County, California, United States. Mabie sits at an elevation of 5,341 feet (1,628 m). Mabie is located on the Western Pacific Railroad, 5 miles (8.0 km) east of Blairsden. The 2020 United States census reported Mabie's population was 181.

== Geography ==
According to the United States Census Bureau, the CDP covers an area of 3.6 square miles (9.4 km^{2}), all land.

== Demographics ==
Historical population
Census	Pop.	Note	%±
2010	161		—
2020	181		12.4%
U.S. Decennial Census; 2010

Mabie first appeared as a census designated place in the 2010 U.S. census.

The 2020 United States census reported that Mabie had a population of 181. The population density was 49.7 inhabitants per square mile (19.2/km^{2}). The racial makeup of Mabie was 160 (88.4%) White, 0 (0.0%) African American, 3 (1.7%) Native American, 0 (0.0%) Asian, 0 (0.0%) Pacific Islander, 1 (0.6%) from other races, and 17 (9.4%) from two or more races. Hispanic or Latino of any race were 8 persons (4.4%).

The whole population lived in households. There were 98 households, out of which 26 (26.5%) had children under the age of 18 living in them, 50 (51.0%) were married-couple households, 7 (7.1%) were cohabiting couple households, 22 (22.4%) had a female householder with no partner present, and 19 (19.4%) had a male householder with no partner present. 27 households (27.6%) were one person, and 15 (15.3%) were one person aged 65 or older. The average household size was 1.85. There were 64 families (65.3% of all households).

The age distribution was 18 people (9.9%) under the age of 18, 4 people (2.2%) aged 18 to 24, 30 people (16.6%) aged 25 to 44, 63 people (34.8%) aged 45 to 64, and 66 people (36.5%) who were 65 years of age or older. The median age was 59.7 years. There were 89 males and 92 females.

There were 115 housing units at an average density of 31.6 units per square mile (12.2 units/km^{2}), of which 98 (85.2%) were occupied. Of these, 89 (90.8%) were owner-occupied, and 9 (9.2%) were occupied by renters.

=== Politics ===
In the state legislature, Mabie is in the 1st senatorial district, represented by Republican Megan Dahle, and the 1st Assembly district, represented by Republican Heather Hadwick.

Federally, Mabie is in California's 3rd congressional district, represented by Independent Kevin Kiley.

== Education ==
The school district is Plumas Unified School District.
