= Cromberg, California =

Cromberg
- Unincorporated Community; Census Designated Place
- Location in Plumas County and the state of California

- Location in the United States
- Coordinates: 39°52′7″N 120°42′25″W
- Country: United States
- State: California
- County: Plumas

Area
  - Total: 9.03 sq mi (23.39 km^{2})
  - Land: 9.03 sq mi (23.39 km^{2})
  - Water: 0 sq mi (0.00 km^{2}) 0%
- Elevation: 4,285 ft (1,306 m)

Population (2020)
  - Total: 272
  - Density: 30.1/sq mi (11.63/km^{2})
- Time zone: UTC-8 (Pacific (PST))
  - Summer (DST): UTC-7 (PDT)
- ZIP code: 96103
- Area code: 530
- FIPS code: 06-17288
- GNIS feature IDs: 1658353; 2407684

Cromberg (formerly, Twenty-Mile House, Taft, and Teft) is a census-designated place (CDP) in Plumas County, California, United States. Cromberg is located on the Western Pacific Railroad, 6.5 miles (10.5 km) northwest of Blairsden. The population was 272 at the 2020 census, up from 261 at the 2010 census.

== History ==
The Cromberg post office opened in 1880, closed in 1912, reopened in 1919, closed again in 1931, and reopened in 1950. The ZIP code is 96103.

The Cromberg Post Office is also in the same location and is run by the managers of the Golden Coach RV Park.

== Geography ==
Cromberg is located at 39°52′7″N 120°42′25″W (39.868589, -120.707044).

According to the United States Census Bureau, the CDP has a total area of 9.0 square miles (23 km^{2}), all land.

== Demographics ==
Historical population
Census	Pop.	Note	%±
2000	290		—
2010	261		−10.0%
2020	272		4.2%
U.S. Decennial Census; 1860–1870 1880-1890; 1900 1910 1920; 1930 1940 1950; 1960 1970 1980; 1990 2000 2010

Cromberg first appeared as a census designated place in the 2000 U.S. census.

=== 2020 census ===
Cromberg CDP, California – Racial and ethnic composition Note: the US Census treats Hispanic/Latino as an ethnic category. This table excludes Latinos from the racial categories and assigns them to a separate category. Hispanics/Latinos may be of any race.
Race / Ethnicity (NH = Non-Hispanic)	Pop 2000	Pop 2010	Pop 2020	% 2000	% 2010	% 2020
White alone (NH)	256	229	222	88.28%	87.74%	81.62%
Black or African American alone (NH)	0	0	0	0.00%	0.00%	0.00%
Native American or Alaska Native alone (NH)	8	4	7	2.76%	1.53%	2.57%
Asian alone (NH)	2	5	3	0.69%	1.92%	1.10%
Native Hawaiian or Pacific Islander alone (NH)	0	0	0	0.00%	0.00%	0.00%
Other race alone (NH)	0	0	1	0.00%	0.00%	0.37%
Mixed race or Multiracial (NH)	16	5	4	5.52%	1.92%	1.47%
Hispanic or Latino (any race)	8	18	35	2.76%	6.90%	12.87%
Total	290	261	272	100.00%	100.00%	100.00%

=== 2010 ===
The 2010 United States census reported that Cromberg had a population of 261. The population density was 29.0 inhabitants per square mile (11.2/km^{2}). The racial makeup of Cromberg was 239 (91.6%) White, 0 (0.0%) African American, 5 (1.9%) Native American, 6 (2.3%) Asian, 0 (0.0%) Pacific Islander, 3 (1.1%) from other races, and 8 (3.1%) from two or more races. Hispanic or Latino of any race were 18 persons (6.9%).

The Census reported that 261 people (100% of the population) lived in households, 0 (0%) lived in non-institutionalized group quarters, and 0 (0%) were institutionalized.

There were 121 households, out of which 19 (15.7%) had children under the age of 18 living in them, 73 (60.3%) were opposite-sex married couples living together, 4 (3.3%) had a female householder with no husband present, 4 (3.3%) had a male householder with no wife present. There were 10 (8.3%) unmarried opposite-sex partnerships, and 0 (0%) same-sex married couples or partnerships. 29 households (24.0%) were made up of individuals, and 14 (11.6%) had someone living alone who was 65 years of age or older. The average household size was 2.16. There were 81 families (66.9% of all households); the average family size was 2.56.

The population was spread out, with 29 people (11.1%) under the age of 18, 15 people (5.7%) aged 18 to 24, 42 people (16.1%) aged 25 to 44, 107 people (41.0%) aged 45 to 64, and 68 people (26.1%) who were 65 years of age or older. The median age was 53.3 years. For every 100 females, there were 91.9 males. For every 100 females age 18 and over, there were 88.6 males.

There were 188 housing units at an average density of 20.9 per square mile (8.1/km^{2}), of which 96 (79.3%) were owner-occupied, and 25 (20.7%) were occupied by renters. The homeowner vacancy rate was 5.0%; the rental vacancy rate was 19.4%. 206 people (78.9% of the population) lived in owner-occupied housing units and 55 people (21.1%) lived in rental housing units.

=== 2000 ===
As of the census of 2000, there were 290 people, 123 households, and 76 families residing in the CDP. The population density was 32.2 inhabitants per square mile (12.4/km^{2}). There were 160 housing units at an average density of 17.7 per square mile (6.8/km^{2}). The racial makeup of the CDP was 88.28% White, 2.76% Native American, 0.69% Asian, 1.38% from other races, and 6.90% from two or more races. 2.76% of the population were Hispanic or Latino of any race.

There were 123 households, out of which 27.6% had children under the age of 18 living with them, 56.9% were married couples living together, 4.1% had a female householder with no husband present, and 38.2% were non-families. 28.5% of all households were made up of individuals, and 8.9% had someone living alone who was 65 years of age or older. The average household size was 2.36 and the average family size was 2.96.

In the CDP, the population was spread out, with 24.8% under the age of 18, 4.8% from 18 to 24, 25.9% from 25 to 44, 30.0% from 45 to 64, and 14.5% who were 65 years of age or older. The median age was 44 years. For every 100 females, there were 102.8 males. For every 100 females age 18 and over, there were 92.9 males.

The median income for a household in the CDP was $51,250, and the median income for a family was $85,874. Males had a median income of $63,750 versus $32,250 for females. The per capita income for the CDP was $24,252. About 6.4% of families and 8.6% of the population were below the poverty line, including 7.4% of those under the age of eighteen and none of those 65 or over.

== Politics ==
In the state legislature, Cromberg is in the 1st senatorial district, represented by Republican Megan Dahle, and the 1st Assembly district, represented by Republican Heather Hadwick. Federally, Cromberg is in California's 3rd congressional district, represented by Independent Kevin Kiley.

== Education ==
The school district is Plumas Unified School District.
