= Warner Valley, California =

Warner Valley
- Unincorporated Community; Census Designated Place
- Position in California.
- Coordinates: 39°46′48″N 120°32′28″W
- Country: United States
- State: California
- County: Plumas

Area
  - Total: 17.42 sq mi (45.13 km^{2})
  - Land: 17.40 sq mi (45.06 km^{2})
  - Water: 0.031 sq mi (0.08 km^{2}) 0.17%
- Elevation: 6,509 ft (1,984 m)

Population (2020)
  - Total: 8
  - Density: 0.46/sq mi (0.18/km^{2})
- Time zone: UTC-8 (Pacific (PST))
  - Summer (DST): UTC-7 (PDT)
- GNIS feature ID: 2583182

Warner Valley is a census-designated place in Plumas County, California, United States. Warner Valley sits at an elevation of 5,341 feet (1,628 m). The 2020 United States census reported Warner Valley's population was 8.

== Geography ==
According to the United States Census Bureau, the CDP covers an area of 17.4 square miles (45.1 km^{2}), of which 99.83% is land and 0.17% is water.

== Demographics ==
Historical population
Census	Pop.	Note	%±
2010	2		—
2020	8		300.0%
U.S. Decennial Census; 1860–1870 1880-1890; 1900 1910 1920; 1930 1940 1950; 1960 1970 1980; 1990 2000 2010

Warner Valley first appeared as a census designated place in the 2010 U.S. census. The 2020 United States Census reported that Warner Valley had a population of 8. The racial makeup of Warner Valley was 7 (87.5%) White and 1 (12.5%) Asian. Hispanic or Latino of any race were 0 persons (0.0%).

== Education ==
The school district is Plumas Unified School District.
