= Tobin, California =

Tobin
- Unincorporated Community; Census Designated Place
- Location in Plumas County and the state of California

- Location in the United States
- Coordinates: 39°56′17″N 121°18′31″W
- Country: United States
- State: California
- County: Plumas

Area
  - Total: 5.161 sq mi (13.368 km^{2})
  - Land: 5.161 sq mi (13.368 km^{2})
  - Water: 0 sq mi (0 km^{2}) 0%
- Elevation: 2,064 ft (629 m)

Population (2020)
  - Total: 19
  - Density: 3.7/sq mi (1.4/km^{2})
- Time zone: UTC-8 (Pacific (PST))
  - Summer (DST): UTC-7 (PDT)
- ZIP code: 95980
- Area code: 530
- FIPS code: 06-78792
- GNIS feature ID: 1660008

Tobin is a census-designated place (CDP) in Plumas County, California, United States. The population was 19 at the 2020 census, up from 12 at the 2010 census.

== Geography ==
Tobin is located at 39°55′14″N 121°17′56″W (39.920539, -121.298918).

According to the United States Census Bureau, the CDP has a total area of 5.2 square miles (13 km^{2}), all land.

Climate data for Tobin, California, 39.9379°N 121.3086°W, Elevation: 2,238 feet (682 m)
| Month | Jan | Feb | Mar | Apr | May | Jun | Jul | Aug | Sep | Oct | Nov | Dec | Year |
|---|---|---|---|---|---|---|---|---|---|---|---|---|---|
| Mean daily maximum °F (°C) | 51.0 (10.6) | 55.2 (12.9) | 60.0 (15.6) | 66.1 (18.9) | 74.9 (23.8) | 84.1 (28.9) | 92.6 (33.7) | 91.9 (33.3) | 86.2 (30.1) | 72.8 (22.7) | 58.8 (14.9) | 50.1 (10.1) | 70.3 (21.3) |
| Daily mean °F (°C) | 41.9 (5.5) | 44.5 (6.9) | 48.3 (9.1) | 52.5 (11.4) | 59.9 (15.5) | 67.3 (19.6) | 74.1 (23.4) | 73.3 (22.9) | 68.0 (20.0) | 58.0 (14.4) | 47.5 (8.6) | 41.4 (5.2) | 56.4 (13.5) |
| Mean daily minimum °F (°C) | 32.9 (0.5) | 33.8 (1.0) | 36.5 (2.5) | 38.9 (3.8) | 44.8 (7.1) | 50.5 (10.3) | 55.6 (13.1) | 54.7 (12.6) | 49.9 (9.9) | 43.2 (6.2) | 36.3 (2.4) | 32.7 (0.4) | 42.5 (5.8) |
| Average precipitation inches (mm) | 11.46 (291) | 11.02 (280) | 10.45 (265) | 5.68 (144) | 3.36 (85) | 1.21 (31) | 0.07 (1.8) | 0.11 (2.8) | 0.45 (11) | 3.60 (91) | 7.31 (186) | 12.74 (324) | 67.46 (1,712.6) |
| Average precipitation days (≥ 0.01 in) | 13.4 | 12.1 | 14.5 | 10.8 | 8.4 | 3.3 | 0.5 | 0.7 | 1.5 | 6.0 | 10.9 | 14.3 | 96.4 |
Source: PRISM (spatially interpolated, 1991-2020 normals)

== Demographics ==
Historical population
| Census | Pop. | Note | %± |
|---|---|---|---|
| 2000 | 11 | | — |
| 2010 | 12 | | 9.1% |
| 2020 | 19 | | 58.3% |
U.S. Decennial Census; 1860–1870 1880-1890; 1900 1910 1920; 1930 1940 1950; 1960 1970 1980; 1990 2000 2010

Tobin first appeared as a census designated place in the 2000 U.S. census.

=== 2020 ===
Tobin CDP, California – Racial and ethnic composition Note: the US Census treats Hispanic/Latino as an ethnic category. This table excludes Latinos from the racial categories and assigns them to a separate category. Hispanics/Latinos may be of any race.
| Race / Ethnicity (NH = Non-Hispanic) | Pop 2000 | Pop 2010 | Pop 2020 | % 2000 | % 2010 | % 2020 |
|---|---|---|---|---|---|---|
| White alone (NH) | 8 | 12 | 14 | 72.73% | 100.00% | 73.68% |
| Black or African American alone (NH) | 0 | 0 | 0 | 0.00% | 0.00% | 0.00% |
| Native American or Alaska Native alone (NH) | 0 | 0 | 1 | 0.00% | 0.00% | 5.26% |
| Asian alone (NH) | 0 | 0 | 0 | 0.00% | 0.00% | 0.00% |
| Native Hawaiian or Pacific Islander alone (NH) | 0 | 0 | 0 | 0.00% | 0.00% | 0.00% |
| Other race alone (NH) | 0 | 0 | 1 | 0.00% | 0.00% | 5.26% |
| Mixed race or Multiracial (NH) | 0 | 0 | 0 | 0.00% | 0.00% | 0.00% |
| Hispanic or Latino (any race) | 3 | 0 | 3 | 27.27% | 0.00% | 15.79% |
| Total | 11 | 12 | 19 | 100.00% | 100.00% | 100.00% |

The 2020 United States census reported that Tobin had a population of 19. The population density was 3.7 inhabitants per square mile (1.4/km^{2}). The racial makeup of Tobin was 14 (74%) White, 0 (0%) African American, 2 (11%) Native American, 0 (0%) Asian, 0 (0%) Pacific Islander, 1 (5%) from other races, and 2 (11%) from two or more races. Hispanic or Latino of any race were 3 persons (16%).

There were 11 households, and the average household size was 1.73. The median age was 68.5 years.

There were 24 housing units at an average density of 4.7 units per square mile (1.8 units/km^{2}), of which 11 (46%) were occupied. Of these, 1 was occupied by a homeowner, and 10 were occupied by renters.

At the 2000 census, the median household income was $11,250 and the median family income was $11,250. The per capita income for the CDP was $2,584, one of the lowest of all statistically measured locations in the United States (although the small sample size means this status must be taken cautiously). Below the poverty line were 100.0% of people and 100.0% of families.

== Media ==
The primary local news source is the Feather River Bulletin, a newspaper published every Wednesday.

== Politics ==
In the state legislature, Tobin is in the 1st senatorial district, represented by Republican Megan Dahle, and the 1st Assembly district, represented by Republican Heather Hadwick.

Federally, Tobin is in California's 3rd congressional district, represented by Independent Kevin Kiley.

== Education ==
The school district is Plumas Unified School District.

== See also ==
- Tobin Bridges
