= Mohawk Vista, California =

Mohawk Vista
- Unincorporated Community; Census Designated Place
- Location in Plumas County and the state of California

- Location in the United States
- Coordinates: 39°46′54″N 120°34′49″W
- Country: United States
- State: California
- County: Plumas

Area
  - Total: 11.968 sq mi (30.998 km^{2})
  - Land: 11.968 sq mi (30.998 km^{2})
  - Water: 0 sq mi (0 km^{2}) 0%
- Elevation: 4,944 ft (1,507 m)

Population (2020)
  - Total: 107
  - Density: 8.94/sq mi (3.45/km^{2})
- Time zone: UTC-8 (Pacific (PST))
  - Summer (DST): UTC-7 (PDT)
- ZIP code: 96103
- Area code: 530
- FIPS code: 06-48448
- GNIS feature ID: 1853401

Mohawk Vista is a census-designated place in Plumas County, California, United States. The population was 107 at the 2020 census, down from 159 at the 2010 census.

== Geography ==
Mohawk Vista is located at 39°46′54″N 120°34′49″W (39.781650, -120.580343).

According to the United States Census Bureau, the CDP has a total area of 12.0 square miles (31 km^{2}), all land.

== Demographics ==
Historical population
Census	Pop.	Note	%±
2000	121		—
2010	159		31.4%
2020	107		−32.7%
U.S. Decennial Census; 1860–1870 1880-1890; 1900 1910 1920; 1930 1940 1950; 1960 1970 1980; 1990 2000 2010

Mohawk Vista first appeared as a census designated place in the 2000 U.S. census.

Mohawk Vista CDP, California – Racial and ethnic composition Note: the US Census treats Hispanic/Latino as an ethnic category. This table excludes Latinos from the racial categories and assigns them to a separate category. Hispanics/Latinos may be of any race.
Race / Ethnicity (NH = Non-Hispanic)	Pop 2000	Pop 2010	Pop 2020	% 2000	% 2010	% 2020
White alone (NH)	118	143	99	97.52%	89.94%	92.52%
Black or African American alone (NH)	0	0	3	0.00%	0.00%	2.80%
Native American or Alaska Native alone (NH)	2	1	0	1.65%	0.63%	0.00%
Asian alone (NH)	0	7	0	0.00%	4.40%	0.00%
Native Hawaiian or Pacific Islander alone (NH)	0	0	0	0.00%	0.00%	0.00%
Other race alone (NH)	0	0	1	0.00%	0.00%	0.93%
Mixed race or Multiracial (NH)	0	4	2	0.00%	2.52%	1.87%
Hispanic or Latino (any race)	1	4	2	0.83%	2.52%	1.87%
Total	121	159	107	100.00%	100.00%	100.00%

The 2020 United States census reported that Mohawk Vista had a population of 107. The population density was 8.9 inhabitants per square mile (3.4/km^{2}). The racial makeup of Mohawk Vista was 101 (94.4%) White, 3 (2.8%) African American, 0 (0.0%) Native American, 0 (0.0%) Asian, 0 (0.0%) Pacific Islander, 1 (0.9%) from other races, and 2 (1.9%) from two or more races. Hispanic or Latino of any race were 2 persons (1.9%).

The whole population lived in households. There were 54 households, out of which 7 (13.0%) had children under the age of 18 living in them, 35 (64.8%) were married-couple households, 1 (1.9%) were cohabiting couple households, 10 (18.5%) had a female householder with no partner present, and 8 (14.8%) had a male householder with no partner present. 16 households (29.6%) were one person, and 12 (22.2%) were one person aged 65 or older. The average household size was 1.98. There were 35 families (64.8% of all households).

The age distribution was 11 people (10.3%) under the age of 18, 3 people (2.8%) aged 18 to 24, 13 people (12.1%) aged 25 to 44, 27 people (25.2%) aged 45 to 64, and 53 people (49.5%) who were 65 years of age or older. The median age was 64.8 years. There were 62 males and 45 females.

There were 95 housing units at an average density of 7.9 units per square mile (3.1 units/km^{2}), of which 54 (56.8%) were occupied. Of these, 51 (94.4%) were owner-occupied, and 3 (5.6%) were occupied by renters.

=== 2010 ===
At the 2010 census Mohawk Vista had a population of 159. The population density was 13.3 people per square mile (5.1/km^{2}). The racial makeup of Mohawk Vista was 146 (91.8%) White, 0 (0.0%) African American, 1 (0.6%) Native American, 7 (4.4%) Asian, 0 (0.0%) Pacific Islander, 1 (0.6%) from other races, and 4 (2.5%) from two or more races. Hispanic or Latino of any race were 4 people (2.5%).

The whole population lived in households, no one lived in non-institutionalized group quarters and no one was institutionalized.

There were 74 households, 9 (12.2%) had children under the age of 18 living in them, 42 (56.8%) were opposite-sex married couples living together, 2 (2.7%) had a female householder with no husband present, 4 (5.4%) had a male householder with no wife present. There were 7 (9.5%) unmarried opposite-sex partnerships, and 0 (0%) same-sex married couples or partnerships. 19 households (25.7%) were one person and 10 (13.5%) had someone living alone who was 65 or older. The average household size was 2.15. There were 48 families (64.9% of households); the average family size was 2.48.

The age distribution was 16 people (10.1%) under the age of 18, 9 people (5.7%) aged 18 to 24, 18 people (11.3%) aged 25 to 44, 65 people (40.9%) aged 45 to 64, and 51 people (32.1%) who were 65 or older. The median age was 59.3 years. For every 100 females, there were 96.3 males. For every 100 females age 18 and over, there were 104.3 males.

There were 102 housing units at an average density of 8.5 per square mile, of the occupied units 62 (83.8%) were owner-occupied and 12 (16.2%) were rented. The homeowner vacancy rate was 3.1%; the rental vacancy rate was 14.3%. 138 people (86.8% of the population) lived in owner-occupied housing units and 21 people (13.2%) lived in rental housing units.

=== 2000 ===
At the 2000 census, the median household income was $40,893 and the median family income was $55,833. Males had a median income of $31,750 versus $30,714 for females. The per capita income for the CDP was $20,172. None of the population and none of the families were below the poverty line.

== Politics ==
In the state legislature, Mohawk Vista is in the 1st senatorial district, represented by Republican Megan Dahle, and the 1st Assembly district, represented by Republican Heather Hadwick.

Federally, Mohawk Vista is in California's 3rd congressional district, represented by Independent Kevin Kiley.

== Education ==
The school district is Plumas Unified School District.
