= Lake Almanor Country Club, California =

Lake Almanor Country Club
- Unincorporated Community; Census Designated Place
- Location in Plumas County and the state of California

- Location in the United States
- Coordinates: 40°14′53″N 121°8′51″W
- Country: United States
- State: California
- County: Plumas

Area
  - Total: 2.743 sq mi (7.105 km^{2})
  - Land: 2.743 sq mi (7.105 km^{2})
  - Water: 0 sq mi (0 km^{2}) 0%

Population (2020)
  - Total: 451
  - Density: 164/sq mi (63.5/km^{2})
- Time zone: UTC-8 (Pacific (PST))
  - Summer (DST): UTC-7 (PDT)
- ZIP code: 96137
- Area codes: 530, 837
- FIPS code: 06-39411
- GNIS feature ID: 2413635

Lake Almanor Country Club is a census-designated place (CDP) in Plumas County, California, United States. The population was 451 at the 2020 census, up from 419 at the 2010 census. The ZIP code for the CDP is 96137.

== Geography ==
Lake Almanor Country Club is located on the shoreline of the Lake Almanor Peninsula, at 40°14′53″N 121°8′51″W (40.248171, -121.147520).

According to the United States Census Bureau, the CDP has a total area of 2.7 square miles (7.0 km^{2}), all land.

== Demographics ==
Historical population
Census	Pop.	Note	%±
2000	847		—
2010	419		−50.5%
2020	451		7.6%
U.S. Decennial Census; 1860–1870 1880-1890; 1900 1910 1920; 1930 1940 1950; 1960 1970 1980; 1990 2000 2010

Lake Almanor Country Club first appeared as a census designated place in the 2000 U.S. census.

=== 2020 ===
Lake Almanor Country Club CDP, California – Racial and ethnic composition Note: the US Census treats Hispanic/Latino as an ethnic category. This table excludes Latinos from the racial categories and assigns them to a separate category. Hispanics/Latinos may be of any race.
Race / Ethnicity (NH = Non-Hispanic)	Pop 2000	Pop 2010	Pop 2020	% 2000	% 2010	% 2020
White alone (NH)	391	400	810	86.70%	95.47%	95.63%
Black or African American alone (NH)	0	2	1	0.00%	0.48%	0.12%
Native American or Alaska Native alone (NH)	3	2	13	0.67%	0.48%	1.53%
Asian alone (NH)	0	1	6	0.00%	0.24%	0.71%
Native Hawaiian or Pacific Islander alone (NH)	0	0	0	0.00%	0.00%	0.00%
Other race alone (NH)	5	0	0	1.11%	0.00%	0.00%
Mixed race or Multiracial (NH)	22	6	8	4.88%	1.43%	0.94%
Hispanic or Latino (any race)	30	8	9	6.65%	1.91%	1.06%
Total	451	419	847	100.00%	100.00%	100.00%

The 2020 United States census reported that Lake Almanor Country Club had a population of 451. The population density was 164.4 inhabitants per square mile (63.5/km^{2}). The racial makeup of Lake Almanor Country Club was 397 (88.0%) White, 0 (0.0%) African American, 7 (1.6%) Native American, 0 (0.0%) Asian, 0 (0.0%) Pacific Islander, 13 (2.9%) from other races, and 34 (7.5%) from two or more races. Hispanic or Latino of any race were 30 persons (6.7%).

The whole population lived in households. There were 230 households, out of which 22 (9.6%) had children under the age of 18 living in them, 135 (58.7%) were married-couple households, 9 (3.9%) were cohabiting couple households, 35 (15.2%) had a female householder with no partner present, and 51 (22.2%) had a male householder with no partner present. 73 households (31.7%) were one person, and 38 (16.5%) were one person aged 65 or older. The average household size was 1.96. There were 147 families (63.9% of all households).

The age distribution was 47 people (10.4%) under the age of 18, 13 people (2.9%) aged 18 to 24, 36 people (8.0%) aged 25 to 44, 134 people (29.7%) aged 45 to 64, and 221 people (49.0%) who were 65 years of age or older. The median age was 64.7 years. For every 100 females, there were 105.9 males.

There were 1,486 housing units at an average density of 541.7 units per square mile (209.2 units/km^{2}), of which 230 (15.5%) were occupied. Of these, 215 (93.5%) were owner-occupied, and 15 (6.5%) were occupied by renters.

=== 2010 ===
The 2010 United States census reported that Lake Almanor Country Club had a population of 419. The population density was 152.7 inhabitants per square mile (59.0/km^{2}). The racial makeup of Lake Almanor Country Club was 406 (96.9%) White, 2 (0.5%) African American, 2 (0.5%) Native American, 1 (0.2%) Asian, 0 (0.0%) Pacific Islander, 2 (0.5%) from other races, and 6 (1.4%) from two or more races. Hispanic or Latino of any race were 8 persons (1.9%).

The Census reported that 419 people (100% of the population) lived in households, 0 (0%) lived in non-institutionalized group quarters, and 0 (0%) were institutionalized.

There were 217 households, out of which 14 (6.5%) had children under the age of 18 living in them, 153 (70.5%) were opposite-sex married couples living together, 5 (2.3%) had a female householder with no husband present, 2 (0.9%) had a male householder with no wife present. There were 5 (2.3%) unmarried opposite-sex partnerships, and 1 (0.5%) same-sex married couples or partnerships. 50 households (23.0%) were made up of individuals, and 27 (12.4%) had someone living alone who was 65 years of age or older. The average household size was 1.93. There were 160 families (73.7% of all households); the average family size was 2.22.

The population was spread out, with 21 people (5.0%) under the age of 18, 9 people (2.1%) aged 18 to 24, 27 people (6.4%) aged 25 to 44, 145 people (34.6%) aged 45 to 64, and 217 people (51.8%) who were 65 years of age or older. The median age was 65.8 years. For every 100 females, there were 103.4 males. For every 100 females age 18 and over, there were 105.2 males.

There were 1,430 housing units at an average density of 521.3 per square mile (201.3/km^{2}), of which 193 (88.9%) were owner-occupied, and 24 (11.1%) were occupied by renters. The homeowner vacancy rate was 3.0%; the rental vacancy rate was 35.9%. 372 people (88.8% of the population) lived in owner-occupied housing units and 47 people (11.2%) lived in rental housing units.

== Politics ==
In the state legislature, Lake Almanor Country Club is in the 1st senatorial district, represented by Republican Megan Dahle, and the 1st Assembly district, represented by Republican Heather Hadwick.

Federally, Lake Almanor Country Club is in California's 3rd congressional district, represented by Independent Kevin Kiley.

== Education ==
The school district is Plumas Unified School District.
