= Spanish Ranch, California =

Unincorporated community in California, United States

Spanish Ranch
- Unincorporated community
- Location in California Spanish Ranch (the United States)
- Coordinates: 39°57′03″N 121°03′26″W
- Country: United States
- State: California
- County: Plumas
- Elevation: 3,668 ft (1,118 m)

California Historical Landmark
- Reference no.: 481

Spanish Ranch is an unincorporated community in Plumas County, California, United States. It lies at an elevation of 3668 feet (1118 m). Spanish Ranch is located 1.25 miles (2.0 km)north- northeast of Meadow Valley.

The place was established by two Mexicans in 1850, and it developed into a distribution center for the numerous mining camps nearby. The Spanish Ranch post office operated from 1861 to 1913. The site is now registered as California Historical Landmark #481.
