= Mohawk Valley (disambiguation) =

The Mohawk Valley region is in the U.S. state of New York.

Mohawk Valley may also refer to:

- The valley of the Mohawk River, a major river in the U.S. state of New York
- The Mohawk Valley formula is a plan for strikebreaking (1936/37)
- Mohawk Valley (Arizona)
- Mohawk Valley, California, former name of Mohawk, California
- Mohawk River (Oregon)
