= Gold Mountain, California =

Unincorporated community in the United States

Gold Mountain
- Unincorporated community Census-designated place
- Location of Gold Mountain in Plumas County, California.

- Position in California.
- Coordinates: 39°45′41″N 120°31′09″W
- Country: United States
- State: California
- County: Plumas

Area
  - Total: 6.088 sq mi (15.768 km^{2})
  - Land: 6.088 sq mi (15.768 km^{2})
  - Water: 0 sq mi (0 km^{2}) 0%
- Elevation: 5,341 ft (1,628 m)

Population (2020)
  - Total: 73
  - Density: 12/sq mi (4.6/km^{2})
- Time zone: UTC-8 (Pacific (PST))
  - Summer (DST): UTC-7 (PDT)
- GNIS feature ID: 2583025

Gold Mountain is an unincorporated community in Plumas County, California, United States. Gold Mountain sits at an elevation of 5,341 feet (1,628 m). The 2020 United States census reported Gold Mountain's population was 73. For statistical purposes, the United States Census Bureau has defined Gold Mountain as a census-designated place (CDP).

== Geography ==
According to the United States Census Bureau, the CDP covers an area of 6.1 square miles (15.8 km^{2}), all of it land. The census definition of the area may not precisely correspond to local understanding of the area with the same name.

== Demographics ==
Historical population
Census	Pop.	Note	%±
2010	80		—
2020	73		−8.7%
U.S. Decennial Census; 2000 2010

Gold Mountain first appeared as a census designated place in the 2010 U.S. census formed from parts of Iron Horse and Valley Ranch CDPs and additional area.

The 2020 United States census reported that Gold Mountain had a population of 73. The population density was 12.0 inhabitants per square mile (4.6/km^{2}). The racial makeup of Gold Mountain was 71 (97%) White, 1 (1%) Pacific Islander, and 1 (1.4%) from two or more races. Hispanic or Latino of any race were 2 persons (3%).

There were 32 households, of which 22 were families and 2 were one person living alone. The median age was 61.9 years.

There were 82 housing units at an average density of 13.5 units per square mile (5.2 units/km^{2}), of which 32 (39%) were occupied. Of these, 23 (72%) were owner-occupied, and 9 (28%) were occupied by renters.

== Politics ==
In the state legislature, Gold Mountain is in the 1st senatorial district, represented by Republican Megan Dahle, and the 1st Assembly district, represented by Republican Heather Hadwick.

Federally, Gold Mountain is in California's 3rd congressional district, represented by Independent Kevin Kiley.

== Education ==
The school district is Plumas Unified School District.
