= East Shore, California =

East Shore
- Unincorporated Community; Census Designated Place
- Location in Plumas County and the state of California

- Location in the United States
- Coordinates: 40°14′33″N 121°4′38″W
- Country: United States
- State: California
- County: Plumas

Area
  - Total: 1.183 sq mi (3.064 km^{2})
  - Land: 1.183 sq mi (3.064 km^{2})
  - Water: 0 sq mi (0 km^{2}) 0%
- Elevation: 4,518 ft (1,377 m)

Population (2020)
  - Total: 181
  - Density: 153/sq mi (59.1/km^{2})
- Time zone: UTC-8 (Pacific (PST))
  - Summer (DST): UTC-7 (PDT)
- ZIP code: 96137
- Area code: 530
- FIPS code: 06-21138
- GNIS feature ID: 1853387

East Shore is a census-designated place (CDP) in Plumas County, California, United States. The population was 181 at the 2020 census, up from 156 at the 2010 census.

== Geography ==
East Shore is located along the south-east shoreline of Lake Almanor, at 40°14′33″N 121°4′38″W (40.242583, -121.077361).

According to the United States Census Bureau, the CDP has a total area of 1.2 square miles (3.1 km^{2}), all land.

== Demographics ==
Historical population
| Census | Pop. | Note | %± |
|---|---|---|---|
| 2000 | 177 | | — |
| 2010 | 156 | | −11.9% |
| 2020 | 181 | | 16.0% |
U.S. Decennial Census; 1860–1870 1880-1890; 1900 1910 1920; 1930 1940 1950; 1960 1970 1980; 1990 2000 2010

East Shore first appeared as a census designated place in the 2000 U.S. census.

=== 2020 ===
East Shore CDP, California – Racial and ethnic composition Note: the US Census treats Hispanic/Latino as an ethnic category. This table excludes Latinos from the racial categories and assigns them to a separate category. Hispanics/Latinos may be of any race.
| Race / Ethnicity (NH = Non-Hispanic) | Pop 2000 | Pop 2010 | Pop 2020 | % 2000 | % 2010 | % 2020 |
|---|---|---|---|---|---|---|
| White alone (NH) | 156 | 141 | 145 | 88.14% | 90.38% | 80.11% |
| Black or African American alone (NH) | 0 | 0 | 0 | 0.00% | 0.00% | 0.00% |
| Native American or Alaska Native alone (NH) | 8 | 7 | 5 | 4.52% | 4.49% | 2.76% |
| Asian alone (NH) | 1 | 1 | 0 | 0.56% | 0.64% | 0.00% |
| Native Hawaiian or Pacific Islander alone (NH) | 0 | 0 | 0 | 0.00% | 0.00% | 0.00% |
| Other race alone (NH) | 0 | 0 | 3 | 0.00% | 0.00% | 1.66% |
| Mixed race or Multiracial (NH) | 1 | 0 | 15 | 0.56% | 0.00% | 8.29% |
| Hispanic or Latino (any race) | 11 | 7 | 13 | 6.21% | 4.49% | 7.18% |
| Total | 177 | 156 | 181 | 100.00% | 100.00% | 100.00% |

The 2020 United States census reported that East Shore had a population of 181. The population density was 153.0 inhabitants per square mile (59.1/km^{2}). The racial makeup of East Shore was 147 (81.2%) White, 0 (0.0%) African American, 5 (2.8%) Native American, 0 (0.0%) Asian, 0 (0.0%) Pacific Islander, 7 (3.9%) from other races, and 22 (12.2%) from two or more races. Hispanic or Latino of any race were 13 persons (7.2%).

The whole population lived in households. There were 83 households, out of which 9 (10.8%) had children under the age of 18 living in them, 53 (63.9%) were married-couple households, 0 (0.0%) were cohabiting couple households, 8 (9.6%) had a female householder with no partner present, and 22 (26.5%) had a male householder with no partner present. 23 households (27.7%) were one person, and 12 (14.5%) were one person aged 65 or older. The average household size was 2.18. There were 58 families (69.9% of all households).

The age distribution was 13 people (7.2%) under the age of 18, 4 people (2.2%) aged 18 to 24, 16 people (8.8%) aged 25 to 44, 52 people (28.7%) aged 45 to 64, and 96 people (53.0%) who were 65 years of age or older. The median age was 66.9 years. There were 93 males and 88 females.

There were 261 housing units at an average density of 220.6 units per square mile (85.2 units/km^{2}), of which 83 (31.8%) were occupied. Of these, 80 (96.4%) were owner-occupied, and 3 (3.6%) were occupied by renters.

=== 2010 ===
At the 2010 census East Shore had a population of 156. The population density was 131.9 inhabitants per square mile (50.9/km^{2}). The racial makeup of East Shore was 143 (91.7%) White, 0 (0.0%) African American, 7 (4.5%) Native American, 1 (0.6%) Asian, 0 (0.0%) Pacific Islander, 5 (3.2%) from other races, and 0 (0.0%) from two or more races. Hispanic or Latino of any race were 7 people (4.5%).

The whole population lived in households, no one lived in non-institutionalized group quarters and no one was institutionalized.

There were 78 households, 7 (9.0%) had children under the age of 18 living in them, 56 (71.8%) were opposite-sex married couples living together, 0 (0%) had a female householder with no husband present, 0 (0%) had a male householder with no wife present. There were 2 (2.6%) unmarried opposite-sex partnerships, and 0 (0%) same-sex married couples or partnerships. 19 households (24.4%) were one person and 9 (11.5%) had someone living alone who was 65 or older. The average household size was 2.00. There were 56 families (71.8% of households); the average family size was 2.34.

The age distribution was 8 people (5.1%) under the age of 18, 6 people (3.8%) aged 18 to 24, 13 people (8.3%) aged 25 to 44, 76 people (48.7%) aged 45 to 64, and 53 people (34.0%) who were 65 or older. The median age was 60.8 years. For every 100 females, there were 88.0 males. For every 100 females age 18 and over, there were 94.7 males.

There were 265 housing units at an average density of 224.0 per square mile, of the occupied units 65 (83.3%) were owner-occupied and 13 (16.7%) were rented. The homeowner vacancy rate was 7.1%; the rental vacancy rate was 30.0%. 129 people (82.7% of the population) lived in owner-occupied housing units and 27 people (17.3%) lived in rental housing units.

=== 2000 ===
At the 2000 census, the median household income was $38,125 and the median family income was $38,906. Males had a median income of $25,781 versus $8,750 for females. The per capita income for the CDP was $18,985. About 10.8% of families and 16.7% of the population were below the poverty line, including none of those under the age of eighteen or sixty five or over.

== Politics ==
In the state legislature, East Shore is in the 1st senatorial district, represented by Republican Megan Dahle, and the 1st Assembly district, represented by Republican Heather Hadwick.

Federally, East Shore is in California's 3rd congressional district, represented by Independent Kevin Kiley.

== Education ==
The school district is Plumas Unified School District.
