= Lake Davis, California =

Lake Davis
- Unincorporated Community; Census Designated Place
- Location in Plumas County and the state of California

- Location in the United States
- Coordinates: 39°52′8″N 120°28′20″W
- Country: United States
- State: California
- County: Plumas

Area
  - Total: 5.441 sq mi (14.092 km^{2})
  - Land: 5.437 sq mi (14.082 km^{2})
  - Water: 0.0039 sq mi (0.010 km^{2}) 0.07%
- Elevation: 5,886 ft (1,794 m)

Population (2020)
  - Total: 72
  - Density: 13/sq mi (5.1/km^{2})
- Time zone: UTC-8 (Pacific (PST))
  - Summer (DST): UTC-7 (PDT)
- ZIP code: 96137
- Area code(s): 530, 837
- FIPS code: 06-39483
- GNIS feature ID: 1853397

Lake Davis is a census-designated place (CDP) in Plumas County, California, United States, located on Lake Davis. The population was 72 at the 2020 census.

== Geography ==
Lake Davis is located at 39°52′8″N 120°28′20″W (39.868841, -120.472214).

According to the United States Census Bureau, the CDP has a total area of 5.4 square miles (14 km^{2}), of which 99.93% is land and 0.07% is water.

== Demographics ==
Historical population
| Census | Pop. | Note | %± |
|---|---|---|---|
| 2000 | 23 | | — |
| 2010 | 45 | | 95.7% |
| 2020 | 72 | | 60.0% |
U.S. Decennial Census; 1860–1870 1880-1890; 1900 1910 1920; 1930 1940 1950; 1960 1970 1980; 1990 2000 2010

Lake Davis first appeared as a census designated place in the 2000 U.S. census.

=== 2020 ===
Lake Davis CDP, California – Racial and ethnic composition Note: the US Census treats Hispanic/Latino as an ethnic category. This table excludes Latinos from the racial categories and assigns them to a separate category. Hispanics/Latinos may be of any race.
| Race / Ethnicity (NH = Non-Hispanic) | Pop 2000 | Pop 2010 | Pop 2020 | % 2000 | % 2010 | % 2020 |
|---|---|---|---|---|---|---|
| White alone (NH) | 20 | 43 | 65 | 86.96% | 95.56% | 90.28% |
| Black or African American alone (NH) | 1 | 0 | 1 | 4.35% | 0.00% | 1.39% |
| Native American or Alaska Native alone (NH) | 0 | 0 | 0 | 0.00% | 0.00% | 0.00% |
| Asian alone (NH) | 0 | 0 | 2 | 0.00% | 0.00% | 2.78% |
| Native Hawaiian or Pacific Islander alone (NH) | 0 | 0 | 0 | 0.00% | 0.00% | 0.00% |
| Other race alone (NH) | 0 | 0 | 0 | 0.00% | 0.00% | 0.00% |
| Mixed race or Multiracial (NH) | 0 | 0 | 1 | 0.00% | 0.00% | 1.39% |
| Hispanic or Latino (any race) | 2 | 2 | 3 | 8.70% | 4.44% | 4.17% |
| Total | 23 | 45 | 72 | 100.00% | 100.00% | 100.00% |

The 2020 United States census reported that Lake Davis had a population of 72. The population density was 13.2 inhabitants per square mile (5.1/km^{2}). The racial makeup of Lake Davis was 65 (90.3%) White, 1 (1.4%) African American, 0 (0.0%) Native American, 2 (2.8%) Asian, 0 (0.0%) Pacific Islander, 0 (0.0%) from other races, and 4 (5.6%) from two or more races. Hispanic or Latino of any race were 3 persons (4.2%).

The whole population lived in households. There were 36 households, out of which 2 (5.6%) had children under the age of 18 living in them, 15 (41.7%) were married-couple households, 2 (5.6%) were cohabiting couple households, 17 (47.2%) had a female householder with no partner present, and 2 (5.6%) had a male householder with no partner present. 18 households (50.0%) were one person, and 14 (38.9%) were one person aged 65 or older. The average household size was 2.0. There were 15 families (41.7% of all households).

The age distribution was 4 people (5.6%) under the age of 18, 6 people (8.3%) aged 18 to 24, 7 people (9.7%) aged 25 to 44, 32 people (44.4%) aged 45 to 64, and 23 people (31.9%) who were 65 years of age or older. The median age was 58.5 years. There were 25 males and 47 females.

There were 146 housing units at an average density of 26.9 units per square mile (10.4 units/km^{2}), of which 36 (24.7%) were occupied. Of these, 20 (55.6%) were owner-occupied, and 16 (44.4%) were occupied by renters.

=== 2010 ===
At the 2010 census Lake Davis had a population of 45. The population density was 8.4 people per square mile (3.2/km^{2}). The racial makeup of Lake Davis was 45 (100.0%) White, 0 (0.0%) African American, 0 (0.0%) Native American, 0 (0.0%) Asian, 0 (0.0%) Pacific Islander, 0 (0.0%) from other races, and 0 (0.0%) from two or more races. Hispanic or Latino of any race were 2 people (4.4%).

The whole population lived in households, no one lived in non-institutionalized group quarters and no one was institutionalized.

There were 23 households, 2 (8.7%) had children under the age of 18 living in them, 17 (73.9%) were opposite-sex married couples living together, 0 (0%) had a female householder with no husband present, 0 (0%) had a male householder with no wife present. There were 1 (4.3%) unmarried opposite-sex partnerships, and 0 (0%) same-sex married couples or partnerships. 5 households (21.7%) were one person and 3 (13.0%) had someone living alone who was 65 or older. The average household size was 1.96. There were 17 families (73.9% of households); the average family size was 2.24.

The age distribution was 4 people (8.9%) under the age of 18, 0 people (0%) aged 18 to 24, 5 people (11.1%) aged 25 to 44, 24 people (53.3%) aged 45 to 64, and 12 people (26.7%) who were 65 or older. The median age was 60.5 years. For every 100 females, there were 104.5 males. For every 100 females age 18 and over, there were 115.8 males.

There were 155 housing units at an average density of 28.8 per square mile, of the occupied units 23 (100%) were owner-occupied and 0 (0%) were rented. The homeowner vacancy rate was 0%; the rental vacancy rate was 0%. 45 people (100% of the population) lived in owner-occupied housing units and 0 people (0%) lived in rental housing units.

== Grizzly Valley Dam ==
The census-designated place is just downstream from the Grizzly Valley Dam, which impounds Lake Davis.

== Politics ==
In the state legislature, Lake Davis is in the 1st senatorial district, represented by Republican Megan Dahle, and the 1st Assembly district, represented by Republican Heather Hadwick.

Federally, Lake Davis is in California's 3rd congressional district, represented by Independent Kevin Kiley.

== Education ==
The school district is Plumas Unified School District.
