= Iron Horse, California =

Iron Horse
- Unincorporated Community; Census Designated Place
- Location in Plumas County and the state of California

- Location in the United States
- Coordinates: 39°47′23″N 120°29′44″W
- Country: United States
- State: California
- County: Plumas

Area
  - Total: 7.744 sq mi (20.056 km^{2})
  - Land: 7.744 sq mi (20.056 km^{2})
  - Water: 0 sq mi (0 km^{2}) 0%
- Elevation: 4,944 ft (1,507 m)

Population (2020)
  - Total: 269
  - Density: 34.7/sq mi (13.4/km^{2})
- Time zone: UTC-8 (Pacific (PST))
  - Summer (DST): UTC-7 (PDT)
- ZIP code: 96122
- Area code: 530
- FIPS code: 06-36735
- GNIS feature ID: 1853395

Iron Horse is a census-designated place (CDP) in Plumas County, California, United States. The population was 269 at the 2020 census, down from 297 at the 2010 census.

== Geography ==
Iron Horse is located at 39°47′23″N 120°29′44″W (39.789714, -120.495605).

According to the United States Census Bureau, the CDP has a total area of 7.7 square miles (20 km^{2}), all land.

== Demographics ==
Historical population
Census	Pop.	Note	%±
2000	321		—
2010	297		−7.5%
2020	269		−9.4%
U.S. Decennial Census; 1860–1870 1880-1890; 1900 1910 1920; 1930 1940 1950; 1960 1970 1980; 1990 2000 2010

Iron Horse first appeared as a census designated place in the 2000 U.S. census.

=== 2020 ===
Iron Horse CDP, California – Racial and ethnic composition Note: the US Census treats Hispanic/Latino as an ethnic category. This table excludes Latinos from the racial categories and assigns them to a separate category. Hispanics/Latinos may be of any race.
Race / Ethnicity (NH = Non-Hispanic)	Pop 2000	Pop 2010	Pop 2020	% 2000	% 2010	% 2020
White alone (NH)	294	273	214	91.59%	91.92%	79.55%
Black or African American alone (NH)	2	0	0	0.62%	0.00%	0.00%
Native American or Alaska Native alone (NH)	0	0	4	0.00%	0.00%	1.49%
Asian alone (NH)	0	1	0	0.00%	0.34%	0.00%
Native Hawaiian or Pacific Islander alone (NH)	0	0	2	0.00%	0.00%	0.74%
Other race alone (NH)	0	0	0	0.00%	0.00%	0.00%
Mixed race or Multiracial (NH)	7	6	16	2.18%	2.02%	5.95%
Hispanic or Latino (any race)	18	17	33	5.61%	5.72%	12.27%
Total	321	297	269	100.00%	100.00%	100.00%

=== 2010 ===
At the 2010 census Iron Horse had a population of 297. The population density was 38.3 inhabitants per square mile (14.8/km^{2}). The racial makeup of Iron Horse was 276 (92.9%) White, 0 (0.0%) African American, 0 (0.0%) Native American, 1 (0.3%) Asian, 0 (0.0%) Pacific Islander, 12 (4.0%) from other races, and 8 (2.7%) from two or more races. Hispanic or Latino of any race were 17 people (5.7%).

The whole population lived in households, no one lived in non-institutionalized group quarters and no one was institutionalized.

There were 126 households, 30 (23.8%) had children under the age of 18 living in them, 79 (62.7%) were opposite-sex married couples living together, 5 (4.0%) had a female householder with no husband present, 4 (3.2%) had a male householder with no wife present. There were 12 (9.5%) unmarried opposite-sex partnerships, and 0 (0%) same-sex married couples or partnerships. 26 households (20.6%) were one person and 7 (5.6%) had someone living alone who was 65 or older. The average household size was 2.36. There were 88 families (69.8% of households); the average family size was 2.75.

The age distribution was 51 people (17.2%) under the age of 18, 23 people (7.7%) aged 18 to 24, 53 people (17.8%) aged 25 to 44, 115 people (38.7%) aged 45 to 64, and 55 people (18.5%) who were 65 or older. The median age was 49.0 years. For every 100 females, there were 96.7 males. For every 100 females age 18 and over, there were 108.5 males.

There were 168 housing units at an average density of 21.7 per square mile, of the occupied units 101 (80.2%) were owner-occupied and 25 (19.8%) were rented. The homeowner vacancy rate was 7.3%; the rental vacancy rate was 16.7%. 242 people (81.5% of the population) lived in owner-occupied housing units and 55 people (18.5%) lived in rental housing units.

=== 2000 ===
At the 2000 census there were 321 people, 122 households, and 96 families in the CDP. The population density was 35.0 inhabitants per square mile (13.5/km^{2}). There were 148 housing units at an average density of 16.1 per square mile (6.2/km^{2}). The racial makeup of the CDP was 92.83% White, 0.62% Black or African American, 0.62% Native American, 2.18% from other races, and 3.74% from two or more races. 5.61% of the population were Hispanic or Latino of any race. Of the 122 households 33.6% had children under the age of 18 living with them, 69.7% were married couples living together, 7.4% had a female householder with no husband present, and 21.3% were non-families. 18.0% of households were one person and 6.6% were one person aged 65 or older. The average household size was 2.63 and the average family size was 2.94.

The age distribution was 24.9% under the age of 18, 5.0% from 18 to 24, 26.8% from 25 to 44, 27.1% from 45 to 64, and 16.2% 65 or older. The median age was 41 years. For every 100 females, there were 85.5 males. For every 100 females age 18 and over, there were 94.4 males.

The median household income was $30,208 and the median family income was $30,000. Males had a median income of $29,091 versus $25,938 for females. The per capita income for the CDP was $11,732. About 14.0% of families and 9.8% of the population were below the poverty line, including none of those under age 18 and 22.2% of those age 65 or over.

== Politics ==
In the state legislature, Iron Horse is in the 1st senatorial district, represented by Republican Megan Dahle, and the 1st Assembly district, represented by Republican Heather Hadwick.

Federally, Iron Horse is in California's 3rd congressional district, represented by Independent Kevin Kiley.

== Education ==
The school district is Plumas Unified School District.
