= Whitehawk (disambiguation) =

Whitehawk is a suburb of Brighton, England.

Whitehawk or similar terms may also refer to:

== Places ==
- Whitehawk, California, United States, a census-designated place in Plumas County
- Whitehawk Hill, a Local Nature Reserve in Brighton, East Sussex
  - Whitehawk Camp, a Neolithic site on Whitehawk Hill

== Sports ==
- Whitehawk F.C., a football club based in Whitehawk, East Sussex
- Frederikshavn White Hawks, an ice hockey team in Denmark
- Waterloo White Hawks, a baseball team in Iowa, USA

== Other ==
- White hawk (Leucopternis albicollis), a bird species
- The VH-60N "White Hawk" helicopter, a variant of the Sikorsky S-70
