= Delleker, California =

Delleker
- Unincorporated Community; Census Designated Place
- Location in Plumas County and the state of California

- Location in the United States
- Coordinates: 39°48′41″N 120°29′52″W
- Country: United States
- State: California
- County: Plumas

Area
  - Total: 2.77 sq mi (7.17 km^{2})
  - Land: 2.76 sq mi (7.16 km^{2})
  - Water: 0 sq mi (0.00 km^{2}) 0.07%
- Elevation: 4,885 ft (1,489 m)

Population (2020)
  - Total: 802
  - Density: 289.9/sq mi (111.95/km^{2})
- Time zone: UTC-8 (Pacific (PST))
  - Summer (DST): UTC-7 (PDT)
- ZIP code: 96122
- Area code: 530
- FIPS code: 06-18485
- GNIS feature ID: 1658405

Delleker is a census-designated place (CDP) in Plumas County, California, United States. The population was 802 at the 2020 census, up from 705 at the 2010 census.

== Geography ==
Delleker is located at 39°48′41″N 120°29′52″W (39.811343, -120.497651).

According to the United States Census Bureau, the CDP has a total area of 2.8 square miles (7.3 km^{2}), of which 99.93% is land and 0.07% is water.

== Demographics ==
Historical population
Census	Pop.	Note	%±
2000	674		—
2010	705		4.6%
2020	802		13.8%
U.S. Decennial Census; 1860–1870 1880-1890; 1900 1910 1920; 1930 1940 1950; 1960 1970 1980; 1990 2000 2010

Delleker first appeared as a census designated place in the 2000 U.S. census.

=== 2020 ===
Delleker CDP, California – Racial and ethnic composition Note: the US Census treats Hispanic/Latino as an ethnic category. This table excludes Latinos from the racial categories and assigns them to a separate category. Hispanics/Latinos may be of any race.
Race / Ethnicity (NH = Non-Hispanic)	Pop 2000	Pop 2010	Pop 2020	% 2000	% 2010	% 2020
White alone (NH)	504	467	503	74.78%	66.24%	62.72%
Black or African American alone (NH)	5	7	2	0.74%	0.99%	0.25%
Native American or Alaska Native alone (NH)	20	15	20	2.97%	2.13%	2.49%
Asian alone (NH)	2	3	6	0.30%	0.43%	0.75%
Native Hawaiian or Pacific Islander alone (NH)	0	0	0	0.00%	0.00%	0.00%
Other race alone (NH)	4	1	8	0.59%	0.14%	1.00%
Mixed race or Multiracial (NH)	30	26	27	4.45%	3.69%	3.37%
Hispanic or Latino (any race)	109	186	236	16.17%	26.38%	29.43%
Total	674	705	802	100.00%	100.00%	100.00%

The 2020 United States census reported that Delleker had a population of 802. The population density was 289.9 inhabitants per square mile (111.9/km^{2}). The racial makeup of Delleker was 568 (70.8%) White, 2 (0.2%) African American, 30 (3.7%) Native American, 8 (1.0%) Asian, 0 (0.0%) Pacific Islander, 104 (13.0%) from other races, and 90 (11.2%) from two or more races. Hispanic or Latino of any race were 236 persons (29.4%).

The whole population lived in households. There were 296 households, out of which 89 (30.1%) had children under the age of 18 living in them, 134 (45.3%) were married-couple households, 18 (6.1%) were cohabiting couple households, 78 (26.4%) had a female householder with no partner present, and 66 (22.3%) had a male householder with no partner present. 109 households (36.8%) were one person, and 55 (18.6%) were one person aged 65 or older. The average household size was 2.71. There were 169 families (57.1% of all households).

The age distribution was 221 people (27.6%) under the age of 18, 55 people (6.9%) aged 18 to 24, 196 people (24.4%) aged 25 to 44, 199 people (24.8%) aged 45 to 64, and 131 people (16.3%) who were 65 years of age or older. The median age was 38.0 years. For every 100 females, there were 95.6 males.

There were 339 housing units at an average density of 122.6 units per square mile (47.3 units/km^{2}), of which 296 (87.3%) were occupied. Of these, 190 (64.2%) were owner-occupied, and 106 (35.8%) were occupied by renters.

== Politics ==
In the state legislature, Delleker is in the 1st senatorial district, represented by Republican Megan Dahle, and the 1st Assembly district, represented by Republican Heather Hadwick.

Federally, Delleker is in California's 3rd congressional district, represented by Independent Kevin Kiley.

== Education ==
The school district is Plumas Unified School District.
