= East Quincy, California =

East Quincy
- Unincorporated Community; Census Designated Place
- Location in Plumas County and the state of California

- Location in the United States
- Coordinates: 39°56′7″N 120°54′28″W
- Country: United States
- State: California
- County: Plumas

Area
  - Total: 12.111 sq mi (31.368 km^{2})
  - Land: 12.111 sq mi (31.368 km^{2})
  - Water: 0 sq mi (0 km^{2}) 0%
- Elevation: 3,491 ft (1,064 m)

Population (2020)
  - Total: 2,463
  - Density: 203.4/sq mi (78.52/km^{2})
- Time zone: UTC-8 (Pacific (PST))
  - Summer (DST): UTC-7 (PDT)
- ZIP code: 95971
- Area codes: 530, 837
- FIPS code: 06-21026
- GNIS feature ID: 1658463

East Quincy is a census-designated place (CDP) in Plumas County, California, United States. The population was 2,463 at the 2020 census, down from 2,489 at the 2010 census.

== Geography ==
East Quincy is located at 39°56′7″N 120°54′28″W (39.935153, -120.907670).

According to the United States Census Bureau, the CDP has a total area of 12.1 square miles (31 km^{2}), all land.

=== Climate ===
East-Quincy is underlain by metasedimentary rock of the Shoo Fly Complex. Its dominant silica-rich clastic material weathers to a stony coarse soil which includes the well or somewhat excessively drained alluvial fan material (mainly Forgay very gravelly sandy loam) on which most of Quincy's businesses and homes have been built. Cultivated land north of the residential area lies on poorly drained loam, silt loam or fine sandy loam.

East-Quincy has a Mediterranean climate (Köppen Csb) though its inland location and altitude makes it more continental and wetter than usual for this type, with very heavy snowfalls sometimes occurring in winter – the record being 133 inches (337.8 cm) in the very wet January 1916. Although summer days are hot and only 1.4 days per winter fail to top 32 °F (0 °C), nights can be very cold and frosts occur on 179 days per year and have been recorded even in July.

Climate data for East-Quincy, California
Month	Jan	Feb	Mar	Apr	May	Jun	Jul	Aug	Sep	Oct	Nov	Dec	Year
Record high °F (°C)	74 (23)	80 (27)	85 (29)	89 (32)	100 (38)	105 (41)	109 (43)	110 (43)	110 (43)	98 (37)	86 (30)	76 (24)	110 (43)
Mean daily maximum °F (°C)	45.3 (7.4)	51.1 (10.6)	56.8 (13.8)	63.7 (17.6)	72.6 (22.6)	81.4 (27.4)	89.5 (31.9)	88.4 (31.3)	82.1 (27.8)	71.1 (21.7)	55.4 (13.0)	46.1 (7.8)	67.0 (19.4)
Mean daily minimum °F (°C)	23.5 (−4.7)	26.2 (−3.2)	29.0 (−1.7)	32.2 (0.1)	37.6 (3.1)	42.2 (5.7)	44.0 (6.7)	41.6 (5.3)	36.8 (2.7)	31.9 (−0.1)	28.5 (−1.9)	25.1 (−3.8)	33.2 (0.7)
Record low °F (°C)	−28 (−33)	−19 (−28)	0 (−18)	12 (−11)	20 (−7)	25 (−4)	23 (−5)	20 (−7)	15 (−9)	6 (−14)	−3 (−19)	−24 (−31)	−28 (−33)
Average precipitation inches (mm)	7.38 (187)	6.47 (164)	5.53 (140)	2.74 (70)	1.74 (44)	0.79 (20)	0.14 (3.6)	0.22 (5.6)	0.87 (22)	2.60 (66)	4.83 (123)	6.84 (174)	40.15 (1,019.2)
Average snowfall inches (cm)	16.9 (43)	11.1 (28)	10.2 (26)	2.8 (7.1)	0.5 (1.3)	0.0 (0.0)	0.0 (0.0)	0.0 (0.0)	0.0 (0.0)	0.5 (1.3)	3.2 (8.1)	9.9 (25)	55.1 (139.8)
Average precipitation days (≥ 0.01 inch)	11	10	10	7	6	3	1	1	2	5	8	10	74
Source: WRCC (temperature normals 1895–2013),

== Demographics ==
Historical population
Census	Pop.	Note	%±
2000	2,398		—
2010	2,489		3.8%
2020	2,463		−1.0%
U.S. Decennial Census; 1860–1870 1880-1890; 1900 1910 1920; 1930 1940 1950; 1960 1970 1980; 1990 2000 2010

East Quincy first appeared as a census designated place in the 2000 U.S. census from part of the deleted Quincy-East Quincy CDP.

=== Racial and ethnic composition ===
East Quincy CDP, California – Racial and ethnic composition Note: the US Census treats Hispanic/Latino as an ethnic category. This table excludes Latinos from the racial categories and assigns them to a separate category. Hispanics/Latinos may be of any race.
Race / Ethnicity (NH = Non-Hispanic)	Pop 2000	Pop 2010	Pop 2020	% 2000	% 2010	% 2020
White alone (NH)	2,150	2,079	1,948	89.66%	83.53%	79.09%
Black or African American alone (NH)	60	75	30	2.50%	3.01%	1.22%
Native American or Alaska Native alone (NH)	33	37	44	1.38%	1.49%	1.79%
Asian alone (NH)	19	12	26	0.79%	0.48%	1.06%
Native Hawaiian or Pacific Islander alone (NH)	2	0	7	0.08%	0.00%	0.28%
Other race alone (NH)	2	3	12	0.08%	0.12%	0.49%
Mixed race or Multiracial (NH)	54	122	175	2.25%	4.90%	7.11%
Hispanic or Latino (any race)	78	161	221	3.25%	6.47%	8.97%
Total	2,398	2,489	2,463	100.00%	100.00%	100.00%

=== 2020 census ===
As of the 2020 census, East Quincy had a population of 2,463 and a population density of 203.4 inhabitants per square mile (78.5/km^{2}). The median age was 42.5 years. The age distribution was 21.2% under the age of 18, 6.8% aged 18 to 24, 25.0% aged 25 to 44, 25.9% aged 45 to 64, and 21.2% who were 65 years of age or older. For every 100 females, there were 102.7 males, and for every 100 females age 18 and over there were 102.1 males age 18 and over.

The racial makeup was 83.3% White, 1.2% Black or African American, 2.0% American Indian and Alaska Native, 1.1% Asian, 0.3% Native Hawaiian and Other Pacific Islander, 2.2% from some other race, and 9.9% from two or more races. Hispanic or Latino people of any race were 9.0% of the population.

The census reported that 98.9% of the population lived in households and 1.1% were institutionalized. There were 1,094 households, of which 27.9% had children under the age of 18 living in them. Of all households, 39.9% were married-couple households, 10.1% were cohabiting-couple households, 21.4% were households with a male householder and no spouse or partner present, and 28.6% were households with a female householder and no spouse or partner present. About 32.7% of all households were made up of individuals and 15.2% had someone living alone who was 65 years of age or older. The average household size was 2.23, and there were 630 families (57.6% of all households).

There were 1,168 housing units at an average density of 96.4 units per square mile (37.2 units/km^{2}). Of these units, 1,094 (93.7%) were occupied, 64.7% were owner-occupied, and 35.3% were occupied by renters. The homeowner vacancy rate was 0.6% and the rental vacancy rate was 2.5%.

0.0% of residents lived in urban areas, while 100.0% lived in rural areas.

=== Income and poverty ===
In 2023, the US Census Bureau estimated that the median household income was $71,591, and the per capita income was $36,196. About 6.8% of families and 9.6% of the population were below the poverty line.

=== 2010 census ===
At the 2010 census East Quincy had a population of 2,489. The population density was 205.6 inhabitants per square mile (79.4/km^{2}). The racial makeup of East Quincy was 2,174 (87.3%) White, 79 (3.2%) African American, 43 (1.7%) Native American, 15 (0.6%) Asian, 0 (0.0%) Pacific Islander, 32 (1.3%) from other races, and 146 (5.9%) from two or more races. Hispanic or Latino of any race were 161 people (6.5%).

The census reported that 2,451 people (98.5% of the population) lived in households, no one lived in non-institutionalized group quarters and 38 (1.5%) were institutionalized.

There were 1,081 households, 299 (27.7%) had children under the age of 18 living in them, 469 (43.4%) were opposite-sex married couples living together, 114 (10.5%) had a female householder with no husband present, 64 (5.9%) had a male householder with no wife present. There were 77 (7.1%) unmarried opposite-sex partnerships, and 11 (1.0%) same-sex married couples or partnerships. 333 households (30.8%) were one person and 102 (9.4%) had someone living alone who was 65 or older. The average household size was 2.27. There were 647 families (59.9% of households); the average family size was 2.78.

The age distribution was 525 people (21.1%) under the age of 18, 261 people (10.5%) aged 18 to 24, 559 people (22.5%) aged 25 to 44, 796 people (32.0%) aged 45 to 64, and 348 people (14.0%) who were 65 or older. The median age was 42.1 years. For every 100 females, there were 103.5 males. For every 100 females age 18 and over, there were 106.3 males.

There were 1,170 housing units at an average density of 96.6 per square mile, of the occupied units 665 (61.5%) were owner-occupied and 416 (38.5%) were rented. The homeowner vacancy rate was 1.9%; the rental vacancy rate was 4.8%. 1,522 people (61.1% of the population) lived in owner-occupied housing units and 929 people (37.3%) lived in rental housing units.

== Politics ==
In the state legislature, East Quincy is a part of the 1st senatorial district, represented by Republican Megan Dahle, and the 1st Assembly district, represented by Republican Heather Hadwick.

Federally, East Quincy is in California's 3rd congressional district, represented by Independent Kevin Kiley.

== Education ==
The school district is Plumas Unified School District.
