= Little Grass Valley =

Little Grass Valley may refer to:

- Little Grass Valley Reservoir, an artificial lake in Plumas County, California
- Little Grass Valley, California, census-designated place associated with the lake
