= C-Road, California =

C-Road
- Unincorporated Community; Census Designated Place
- Location in Plumas County and the state of California

- Location in the United States
- Coordinates: 39°45′34″N 120°35′1″W
- Country: United States
- State: California
- County: Plumas

Area
  - Total: 2.66 sq mi (6.89 km^{2})
  - Land: 2.66 sq mi (6.89 km^{2})
  - Water: 0 sq mi (0.00 km^{2}) 0%
- Elevation: 4,793 ft (1,461 m)

Population (2020)
  - Total: 140
  - Density: 52.6/sq mi (20.32/km^{2})
- Time zone: UTC-8 (Pacific (PST))
  - Summer (DST): UTC-7 (PDT)
- ZIP code: 96135
- Area codes: 530, 837
- FIPS code: 06-17267
- GNIS feature ID: 2407682

C-Road is a census-designated place (CDP) in Plumas County, California, United States. The population was 140 at the 2020 census, down from 150 at the 2010 census.

== Geography ==
C-Road is located at 39°45′34″N 120°35′1″W (39.759419, -120.583560).

According to the United States Census Bureau, the CDP has a total area of 2.7 square miles (7.0 km^{2}), all land.

== Demographics ==
Historical population
Census	Pop.	Note	%±
2000	152		—
2010	150		−1.3%
2020	140		−6.7%
U.S. Decennial Census; 1850–1870 1880-1890; 1900 1910 1920; 1930 1940 1950; 1960 1970 1980; 1990 2000 2010

C-Road first appeared as a census designated place in the 2000 U.S. census.

=== Racial and ethnic composition ===
C-Road CDP, California – Racial and ethnic composition Note: the US Census treats Hispanic/Latino as an ethnic category. This table excludes Latinos from the racial categories and assigns them to a separate category. Hispanics/Latinos may be of any race.
Race / Ethnicity (NH = Non-Hispanic)	Pop 2000	Pop 2010	Pop 2020	% 2000	% 2010	% 2020
White alone (NH)	141	138	128	92.76%	92.00%	91.43%
Black or African American alone (NH)	4	0	0	2.63%	0.00%	0.00%
Native American or Alaska Native alone (NH)	1	0	0	0.66%	0.00%	0.00%
Asian alone (NH)	3	1	1	1.97%	0.67%	0.71%
Native Hawaiian or Pacific Islander alone (NH)	0	0	0	0.00%	0.00%	0.00%
Other race alone (NH)	0	0	0	0.00%	0.00%	0.00%
Mixed race or Multiracial (NH)	1	2	8	0.66%	1.33%	5.71%
Hispanic or Latino (any race)	2	9	3	1.32%	6.00%	2.14%
Total	152	150	140	100.00%	100.00%	100.00%

=== 2020 census ===
As of the 2020 census, C-Road had a population of 140. The median age was 62.4 years. 19.3% of residents were under the age of 18 and 35.7% of residents were 65 years of age or older. For every 100 females there were 89.2 males, and for every 100 females age 18 and over there were 82.3 males age 18 and over.

0.0% of residents lived in urban areas, while 100.0% lived in rural areas.

There were 58 households in C-Road, of which 8.6% had children under the age of 18 living in them. Of all households, 46.6% were married-couple households, 27.6% were households with a male householder and no spouse or partner present, and 15.5% were households with a female householder and no spouse or partner present. About 24.2% of all households were made up of individuals and 18.9% had someone living alone who was 65 years of age or older.

There were 108 housing units, of which 46.3% were vacant. The homeowner vacancy rate was 21.7% and the rental vacancy rate was 0.0%.

=== 2010 census ===
The 2010 United States census reported that C-Road had a population of 150. The population density was 56.3 inhabitants per square mile (21.7/km^{2}). The racial makeup of C-Road was 140 (93.3%) White, 0 (0.0%) African American, 0 (0.0%) Native American, 2 (1.3%) Asian, 0 (0.0%) Pacific Islander, 0 (0.0%) from other races, and 8 (5.3%) from two or more races. Hispanic or Latino of any race were 9 persons (6.0%).

The Census reported that 150 people (100% of the population) lived in households, 0 (0%) lived in non-institutionalized group quarters, and 0 (0%) were institutionalized.

There were 73 households, out of which 11 (15.1%) had children under the age of 18 living in them, 49 (67.1%) were opposite-sex married couples living together, 3 (4.1%) had a female householder with no husband present, 2 (2.7%) had a male householder with no wife present. There were 2 (2.7%) unmarried opposite-sex partnerships, and 1 (1.4%) same-sex married couples or partnerships. 17 households (23.3%) were made up of individuals, and 4 (5.5%) had someone living alone who was 65 years of age or older. The average household size was 2.05. There were 54 families (74.0% of all households); the average family size was 2.37.

The population was spread out, with 17 people (11.3%) under the age of 18, 6 people (4.0%) aged 18 to 24, 25 people (16.7%) aged 25 to 44, 73 people (48.7%) aged 45 to 64, and 29 people (19.3%) who were 65 years of age or older. The median age was 53.3 years. For every 100 females, there were 117.4 males. For every 100 females age 18 and over, there were 111.1 males.

There were 102 housing units at an average density of 38.3 per square mile (14.8/km^{2}), of which 65 (89.0%) were owner-occupied, and 8 (11.0%) were occupied by renters. The homeowner vacancy rate was 3.0%; the rental vacancy rate was 0%. 131 people (87.3% of the population) lived in owner-occupied housing units and 19 people (12.7%) lived in rental housing units.

=== 2000 census ===
As of the census of 2000, there were 152 people, 61 households, and 50 families residing in the CDP. The population density was 58.3 inhabitants per square mile (22.5/km^{2}). There were 79 housing units at an average density of 30.3 per square mile (11.7/km^{2}). The racial makeup of the CDP was 94.08% White, 2.63% Black or African American, 0.66% Native American, 1.97% Asian, and 0.66% from two or more races. 1.32% of the population were Hispanic or Latino of any race.

There were 61 households, out of which 31.1% had children under the age of 18 living with them, 67.2% were married couples living together, 4.9% had a female householder with no husband present, and 18.0% were non-families. 16.4% of all households were made up of individuals, and 4.9% had someone living alone who was 65 years of age or older. The average household size was 2.49 and the average family size was 2.80.

In the CDP, the population was spread out, with 23.0% under the age of 18, 3.3% from 18 to 24, 22.4% from 25 to 44, 39.5% from 45 to 64, and 11.8% who were 65 years of age or older. The median age was 46 years. For every 100 females, there were 130.3 males. For every 100 females age 18 and over, there were 129.4 males.

The median income for a household in the CDP was $26,250, and the median income for a family was $51,250. Males had a median income of $51,250 versus $0 for females. The per capita income for the CDP was $18,088. About 27.1% of families and 33.8% of the population were below the poverty line, including 66.7% of those under the age of eighteen and 66.7% of those 65 or over.

== Politics ==
In the state legislature, C-Road is in the 1st senatorial district, represented by Republican Megan Dahle, and the 1st Assembly district, represented by Republican Heather Hadwick.

Federally, C-Road is in California's 3rd congressional district, represented by Independent Kevin Kiley.

== Education ==
The school district is Plumas Unified School District.
