= Seneca, California =

Unincorporated community in California, United States

Seneca
- Unincorporated community
- Location in California Seneca (the United States)
- Coordinates: 40°06′38″N 121°05′05″W
- Country: United States
- State: California
- County: Plumas
- Elevation: 3,625 ft (1,105 m)

Seneca (formerly, North Fork) is an unincorporated community in Plumas County, California, United States. It lies at an elevation of 3625 feet (1105 m). Seneca is located on the North Fork Feather River, 6.25 miles (10.1 km) north of Twain.

The Seneca post office opened in 1902, closed in 1918, reopened in 1923, moved in 1941, and closed finally in 1943.

In 2013, the owners of the 12 acres comprising Seneca were offering it for sale, at a price of $225,000.
