= Storrie, California =

Storrie
- Unincorporated community Former census-designated place
- Location in Plumas County and the state of California

- Location in the United States
- Coordinates: 39°55′3″N 121°19′24″W
- Country: United States
- State: California
- County: Plumas

Area
  - Total: 0.084 sq mi (0.217 km^{2})
  - Land: 0.084 sq mi (0.217 km^{2})
  - Water: 0 sq mi (0 km^{2}) 0%
- Elevation: 1,785 ft (544 m)

Population (2010)
  - Total: 4
  - Density: 48/sq mi (18/km^{2})
- Time zone: UTC-8 (Pacific (PST))
  - Summer (DST): UTC-7 (PDT)
- ZIP code: 95980
- Area code: 530
- FIPS code: 06-75168
- GNIS feature ID: 1659883

Storrie is an unincorporated community and former census-designated place (CDP) in Plumas County, California, United States, and about 20 miles northeast of Lake Oroville. As of the 2010 Census, the CDP had a population of four.

== Geography ==
According to the United States Census Bureau, the CDP has a total area of 0.1 square miles (0.26 km^{2}), all land.

== Demographics ==
Historical population
Census	Pop.	Note	%±
2000	5		—
2010	4		−20.0%
U.S. Decennial Census; 1850–1870 1880-1890; 1900 1910 1920; 1930 1940 1950; 1960 1970 1980; 1990 2000 2010

Storrie first appeared as a census designated place in the 2000 U.S. census. It was deleted prior to the 2020 U.S. census.

=== 2010 ===
Storrie CDP, California – Racial and ethnic composition Note: the US Census treats Hispanic/Latino as an ethnic category. This table excludes Latinos from the racial categories and assigns them to a separate category. Hispanics/Latinos may be of any race.
Race / Ethnicity (NH = Non-Hispanic)	Pop 2000	Pop 2010	% 2000	% 2010
White alone (NH)	5	4	100.00%	100.00%
Black or African American alone (NH)	0	0	0.00%	0.00%
Native American or Alaska Native alone (NH)	0	0	0.00%	0.00%
Asian alone (NH)	0	0	0.00%	0.00%
Pacific Islander alone (NH)	0	0	0.00%	0.00%
Some Other Race alone (NH)	0	0	0.00%	0.00%
Mixed Race or Multi-Racial (NH)	0	0	0.00%	0.00%
Hispanic or Latino (any race)	0	0	0.00%	0.00%
Total	5	4	0.00%	0.00%

At the 2010 census Storrie had a population of 4. The population density was 47.7 inhabitants per square mile (18.4/km^{2}). The racial makeup of Storrie was 4 (100.0%) White, 0 (0.0%) African American, 0 (0.0%) Native American, 0 (0.0%) Asian, 0 (0.0%) Pacific Islander, 0 (0.0%) from other races, and 0 (0.0%) from two or more races. Hispanic or Latino of any race were 0 people (0.0%).

The whole population lived in households, no one lived in non-institutionalized group quarters and no one was institutionalized.

There were 2 households, 1 (50%) had children under the age of 18 living in them, 2 (100%) were opposite-sex married couples living together, 0 (0%) had a female householder with no husband present, 0 (0%) had a male householder with no wife present. There were 0 (0%) unmarried opposite-sex partnerships, and 0 (0%) same-sex married couples or partnerships. 0 households (0%) were one person and 0 (0%) had someone living alone who was 65 or older. The average household size was 2.00. There were 2 families (100% of households); the average family size was 2.00.

The age distribution was 0 people (0%) under the age of 18, 0 people (0%) aged 18 to 24, 0 people (0%) aged 25 to 44, 2 people (50.0%) aged 45 to 64, and 2 people (50.0%) who were 65 or older. The median age was 62.5 years. For every 100 females, there were 100.0 males. For every 100 females aged 18 and over, there were 100.0 males.

There were 9 housing units at an average density of 107.3 per square mile, of the occupied units 1 (50.0%) was owner-occupied and 1 (50.0%) was rented. The homeowner vacancy rate was 0%; the rental vacancy rate was 0%. 2 people (50.0% of the population) lived in owner-occupied housing units and 2 people (50.0%) lived in rental housing units.

=== 2000 ===
At the 2000 census, there were 5 people, 3 households, and 2 families in the CDP. The population density was 57.1 inhabitants per square mile (22.0/km^{2}). There were 10 housing units at an average density of 114.2 per square mile (44.1/km^{2}). The racial makeup of the CDP was 100.00% White. Of the 3 households, none had children under the age of 18 living with them, 66.7% were married couples living together, none had a female householder with no husband present, and 33.3% were non-families. Individuals make up 33.3% of households, and none had someone living alone who is 65 or older. The average household size was 1.67 and the average family size was 2.00.

In the CDP, the entire population was spread out from 45 to 64, with a median age of 55 years. For every 2 females there were 3 males.

== Politics ==
In the state legislature, Storrie is in the 1st senatorial district, represented by Republican Megan Dahle, and the 1st Assembly district, represented by Republican Heather Hadwick.

Federally, Storrie is in California's 3rd congressional district, represented by Independent Kevin Kiley.
