= Plumas County, California =

County in California, United States

Coordinates: 40.01°N 120.83°W

Plumas County
- County
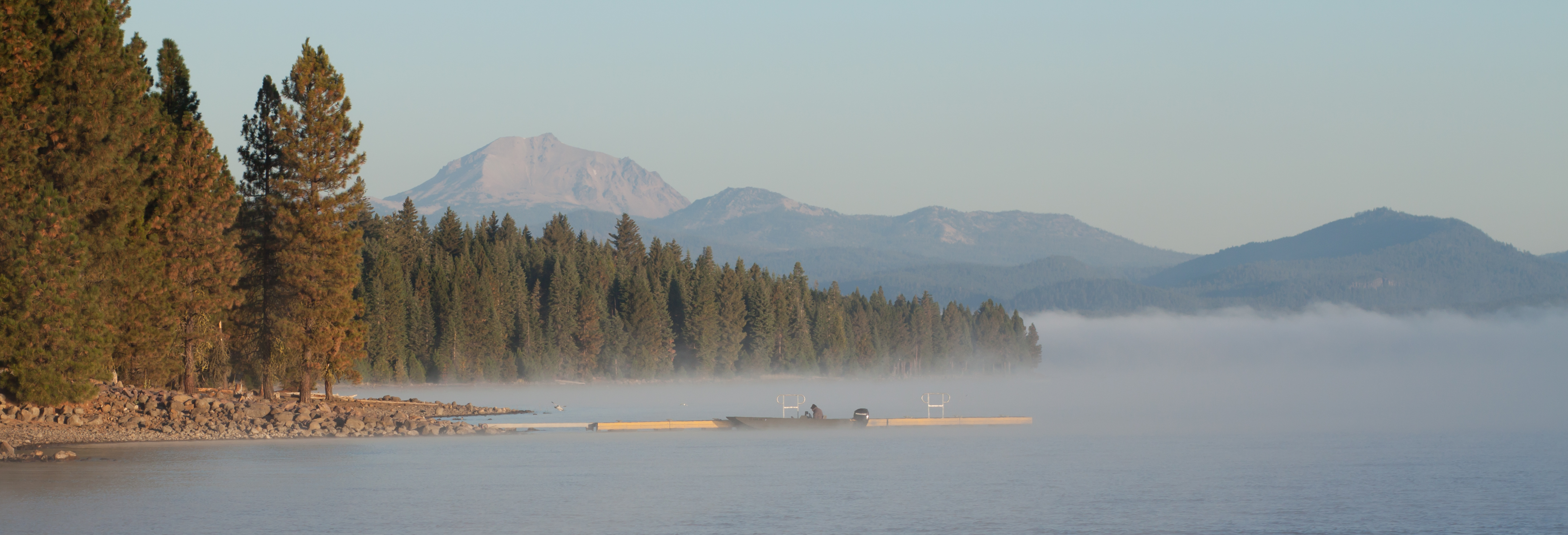
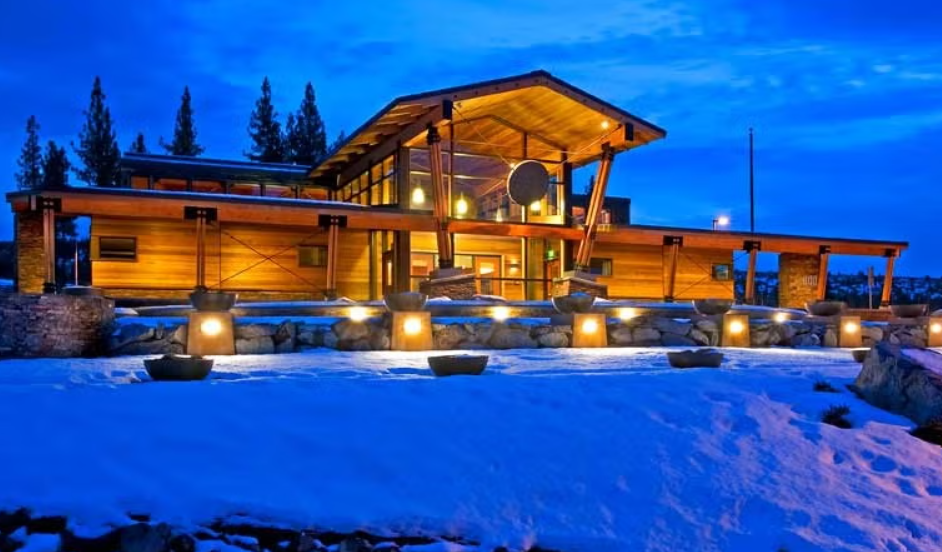
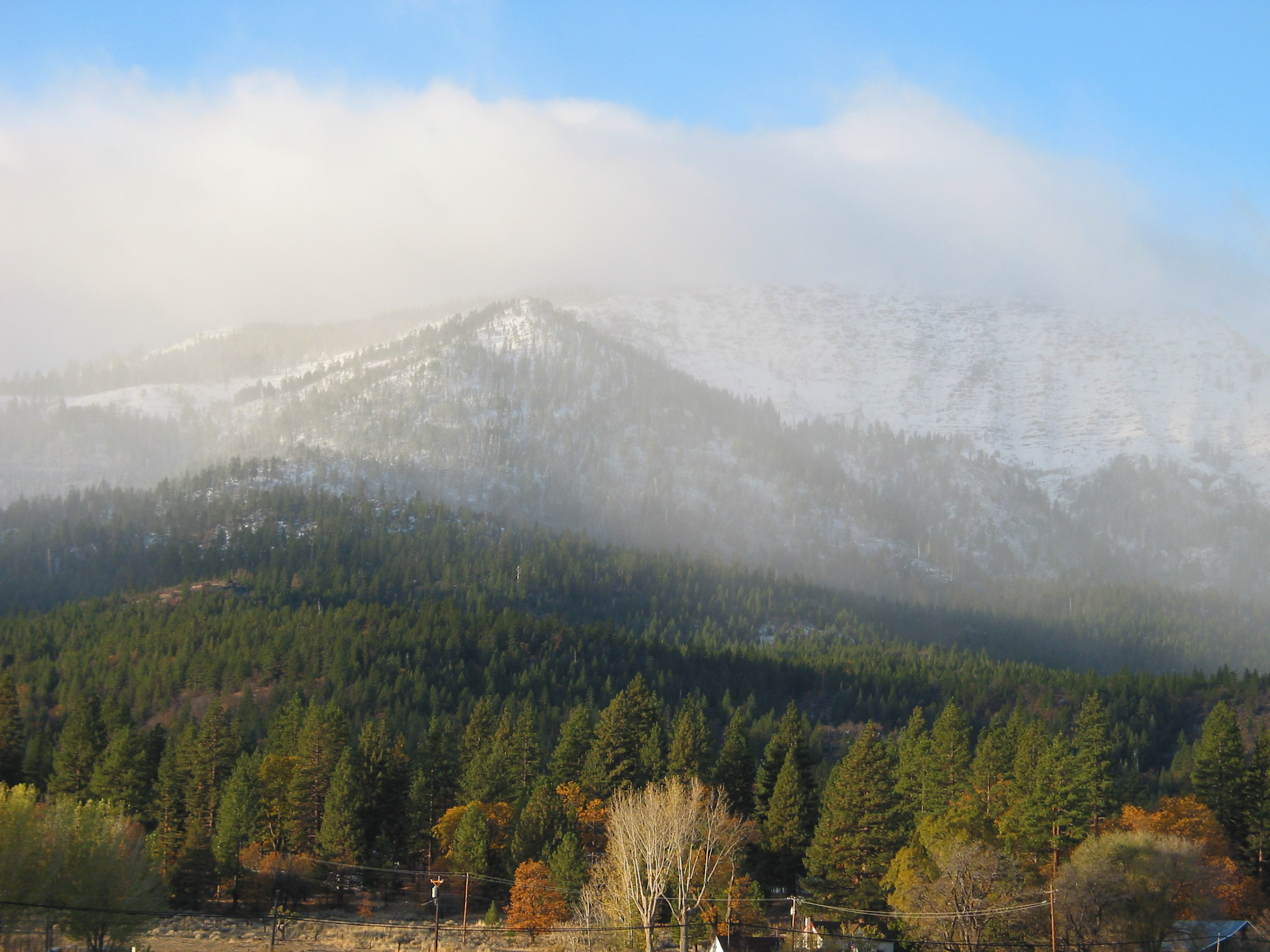
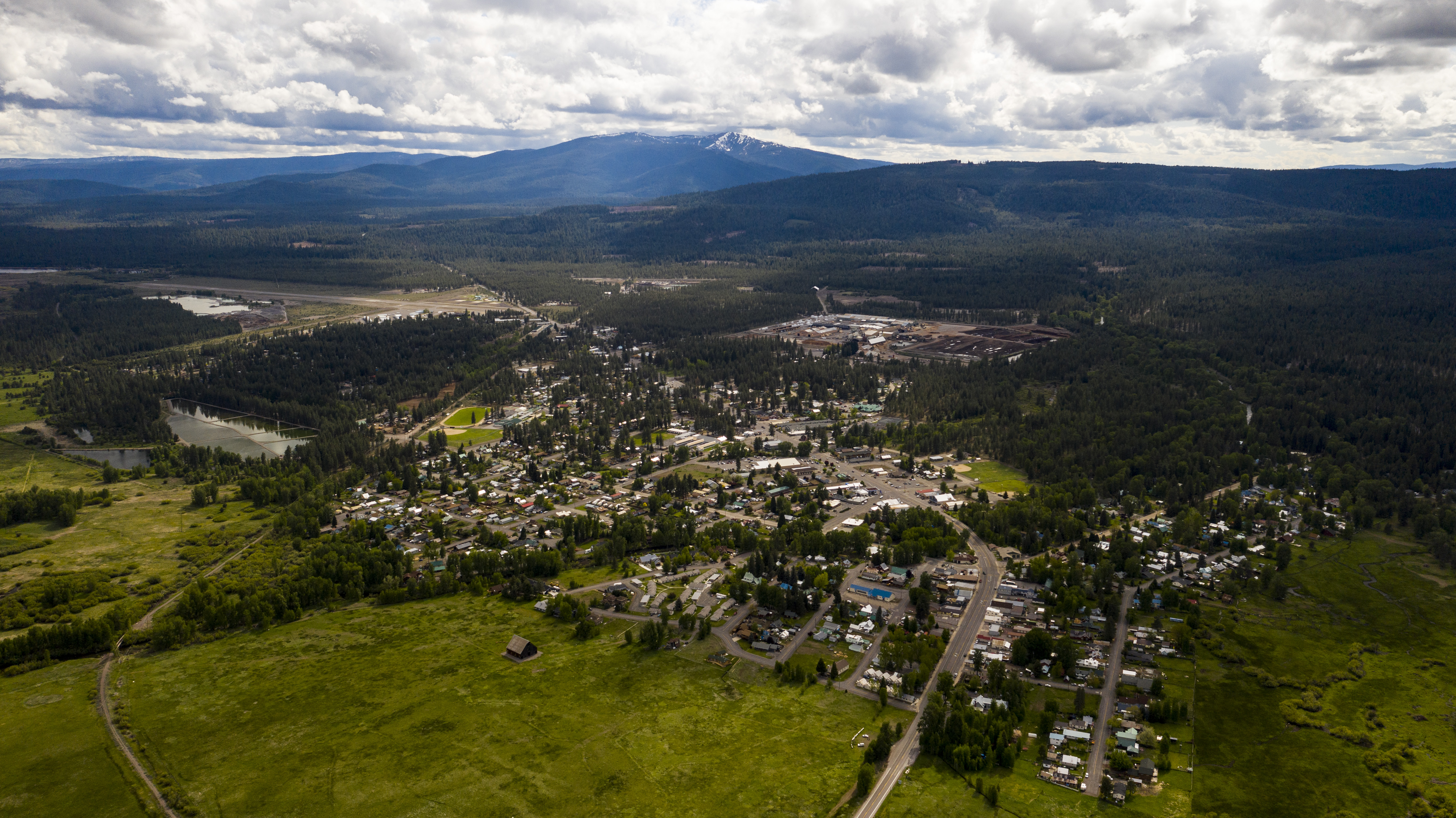
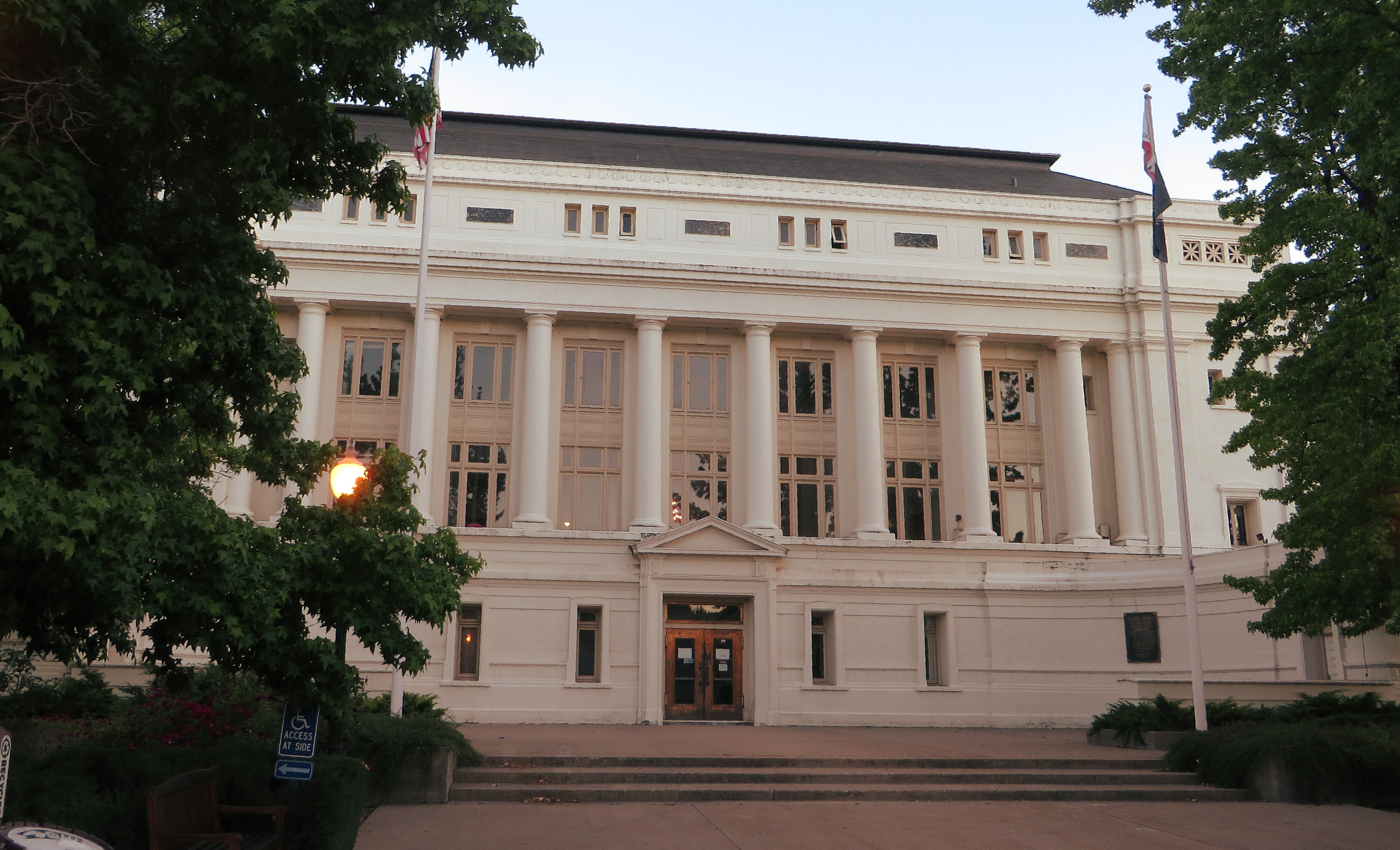
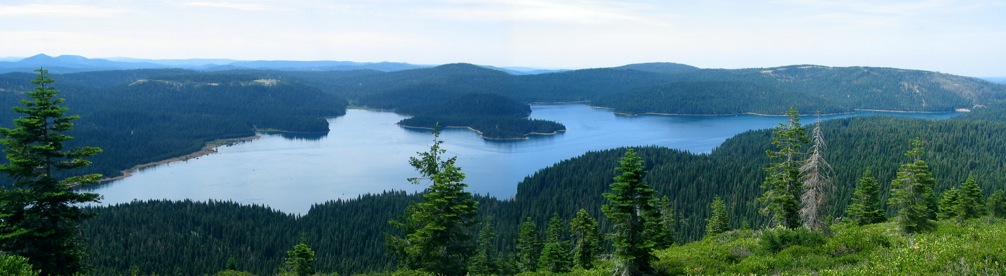
- Lake Almanor in Lassen National Forest Portola Thompson Peak Chester Quincy Little Grass Valley in Plumas National Forest

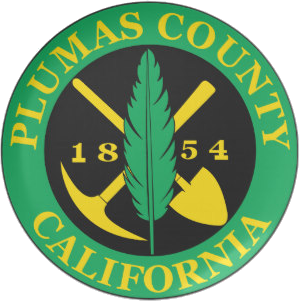
- Seal
- Interactive map of Plumas County
- Location in the state of California
- Country: United States
- State: California
- Region: Sierra Nevada
- Incorporated: March 18, 1854
- Named for: Spanish words for the Feather River (Río de las Plumas)
- County seat: Quincy
- Largest community: East Quincy (population); Warner Valley (area); Portola (incorporated)

Government
  - Type: Council–Administrator
  - Chair: Mimi Hall
  - Vice Chair: Kevin Goss
  - Board of Supervisors: Supervisors: Dwight Ceresola; Kevin Goss; Tom McGowan; Mimi Hall; Jeff Engel
  - County Administrator: Debra Lucero

Area
  - Total: 2,613 sq mi (6,770 km^{2})
  - Land: 2,553 sq mi (6,610 km^{2})
  - Water: 60 sq mi (160 km^{2})
- Highest elevation: 8,372 ft (2,552 m)

Population (April 1, 2020)
  - Total: 19,790
  - Estimate (2025): 18,583 ▼
  - Density: 7.752/sq mi (2.993/km^{2})

GDP
  - Total: $1.121 billion (2022)
- Time zone: UTC-8 (Pacific Standard Time)
  - Summer (DST): UTC-7 (Pacific Daylight Time)
- Congressional district: 3rd
- Website: www.plumascounty.us

Plumas County (/ˈpluːməs/) is a county located in the Sierra Nevada of the U.S. state of California. As of the 2020 United States census, the population was 19,790. The county seat is Quincy, and the only incorporated city is Portola. The largest community in the county is East Quincy. The county was named for the Spanish Río de las Plumas (the Feather River), which flows through it. It is also the namesake of a native moth species, Hadena plumasata.

== History ==
The indigenous Mountain Maidu were the primary inhabitants of pre-Columbian Plumas County, living in small settlements along the edges of valleys and subsisting on roots, acorns, grasses, seeds, and occasionally fish and big game. They were decentralized and had no tribal leadership; most bands lived along waterways in and around their own valleys. Areas with high snowfall, including the Mohawk and Sierra valleys, were hunting grounds for game in the warmer months.

In 1848, European Americans discovered gold in the Sierra foothills. Miners were attracted to Plumas County in particular, largely due to the tales of Thomas Stoddard, who claimed to have discovered a lake lined with gold nuggets while lost in the wilderness. Gold-hungry prospectors flooded the area. Though hopeful miners scoured the glacial lakes for months, they did not find the purported lake of gold. But some had success panning for gold in the rivers and creeks in the area, and created squatters' villages, the first non-Native American settlements.

Rough shanty towns quickly sprang up around successful mining areas, including Rich Bar, Indian Bar, and Rabbit Creek (now La Porte). Many were developed adjacent to the Feather River, named Río de las Plumas by Spanish explorer Captain Luis Arguello in 1820.

In 1850, African-American frontiersman James Beckwourth discovered the lowest pass through the Sierras, which became known as Beckwourth Pass. Using the pass, he blazed a trail from Western Nevada through much of Plumas County, eventually terminating in the Sacramento Valley. Many erstwhile miners followed this trail into Plumas County. Beckwourth also set up a trading post in the western Sierra Valley that still stands today. Though the Beckwourth Trail was longer than the original emigrant trail that ran south of Plumas County, its lower elevations extended its seasonal use when the higher trail was snowbound and impassable. Between 1851 and 1854, the Beckwourth Trail was frequently traveled, but in 1854, use dropped sharply when it became a toll road. The toll to move a ton of freight from Bidwell Bar to Quincy was about $18. This made using the Beckwourth Road an expensive enterprise and use of the Beckwourth Trail declined.

Plumas County was formed in 1854 during a meeting of three commissioners at the American Ranch in Quincy. It was carved from the eastern portion of Butte County. Quincy, originally a mining town, was chosen as the county seat after an early settler donated a plot of land there to establish the seat. Once it became the seat, nearby Elizabethtown faded and ultimately became defunct. In 1864, the state legislature took a large portion of Plumas County to organize Lassen County. Shortly afterward, Plumas County annexed part of Sierra County, including the prosperous mining town of La Porte.

Over the next decades, different industries drove the growth of the various settlements that sprang up around the county. Greenville began as a mining and farming community in Indian Valley in the late 1850s. Chester was formed near the area that is now Lake Almanor, as a result of cattle ranching and the timber industry.

When the Western Pacific Railroad was constructed in 1910, Portola developed as an important railroad stop. Thanks to the railroad, Plumas County could export its lumber beyond the local area, and the timber industry became dominant in the county's economy for decades. As the railroad route extended up the Feather River Canyon, it was also used by the area's first tourists and sightseers. When the Feather River Highway was completed in 1937 with federal investment in infrastructure by President Franklin D. Roosevelt during the Great Depression, Plumas County became linked to the Sacramento Valley year-round thanks to the route's low elevation.

== Geography ==
According to the U.S. Census Bureau, the county has an area of 2,613 square miles (6,770 km^{2}), of which 2,553 square miles (6,610 km^{2}) is land and 60 square miles (160 km^{2}) (2.3%) is water.

Plumas County is in the far northern end of the Sierra Nevada range. The area's rugged terrain marks the transition point between the northern Sierra Nevada and the southern end of the Cascade Range. Lassen Peak, the southernmost volcanic peak in the Cascade Range, is just north of Plumas County's border, and part of Lassen Volcanic National Park extends into the county's northwest corner.

Plumas National Forest's 1,200,000 acres (4,900 km^{2}) offer a wide variety of outdoor recreation opportunities, including hiking, camping, kayaking, swimming, mountain biking, hunting and fishing. The area has more than 100 natural and artificial lakes. Many of the natural lakes are glacial in origin and can be found in and around Lakes Basin Recreation Area. The artificial lakes include Lake Almanor, Lake Davis, Frenchman Lake, Little Grass Valley Reservoir, Antelope Lake, and Bucks Lake. Plumas County also has more than 1,000 miles (1,600 km) of rivers and streams. All three forks of the Feather River run through the area.

=== Designated Natural Areas ===
- Butterfly Valley Botanical Area
- Elephants Playground
- Happy Valley
- Little Last Chance Canyon Special Interest Area
- North Valley
- Valley Creek Special Interest Area

=== Water areas ===
- Antelope Lake
- Belden Forebay
- Bucks Lake
- Butt Valley Reservoir
- Doyle Reservoir
- Eureka Lake
- Faggs Debris Dam
- Faggs Reservoir
- Fowler Lake
- Frenchman Lake
- Grizzly Forebay
- Grizzly Ice Pond
- Juniper Lake
- Lake Almanor
- Lake Davis
- Little Grass Valley Reservoir
- Lower Bucks Lake
- Murphy Lake
- Onion Valley Reservoir
- Rock Creek Reservoir
- Round Valley Reservoir
- Silver Lake
- Slate Creek Reservoir
- Smith Lake
- Three Lakes
- Walker Mine Tailings Reservoir

=== Adjacent counties ===
- Sierra County – south
- Yuba County – southwest
- Butte County – west
- Tehama County – northwest
- Shasta County – northwest
- Lassen County – northeast

=== National protected areas ===
- Lassen National Forest (part)
- Lassen Volcanic National Park (part)
- Plumas National Forest (part)
- Tahoe National Forest (part)

== Demographics ==
Historical population
Census	Pop.	Note	%±
1860	4,363		—
1870	4,489		2.9%
1880	6,180		37.7%
1890	4,933		−20.2%
1900	4,657		−5.6%
1910	5,259		12.9%
1920	5,681		8.0%
1930	7,913		39.3%
1940	11,548		45.9%
1950	13,519		17.1%
1960	11,620		−14.0%
1970	11,707		0.7%
1980	17,340		48.1%
1990	19,739		13.8%
2000	20,824		5.5%
2010	20,007		−3.9%
2020	19,790		−1.1%
2025 (est.)	18,583	▼	−6.1%
U.S. Decennial Census; 1790–1960 1900–1990; 1990–2000 2010–2015

=== 2020 census ===
Plumas County, California – Racial and ethnic composition Note: the US Census treats Hispanic/Latino as an ethnic category. This table excludes Latinos from the racial categories and assigns them to a separate category. Hispanics/Latinos may be of any race.
Race / Ethnicity (NH = Non-Hispanic)	Pop 1980	Pop 1990	Pop 2000	Pop 2010	Pop 2020	% 1980	% 1990	% 2000	% 2010	% 2020
White alone (NH)	16,001	17,996	18,473	17,015	15,999	92.28%	91.17%	88.71%	85.05%	80.84%
Black or African American alone (NH)	163	151	130	181	102	0.94%	0.76%	0.62%	0.90%	0.52%
Native American or Alaska Native alone (NH)	498	561	444	460	382	2.87%	2.84%	2.13%	2.30%	1.93%
Asian alone (NH)	42	112	107	127	145	0.24%	0.57%	0.51%	0.63%	0.73%
Native Hawaiian or Pacific Islander alone (NH)	x	x	19	18	40	0.09%	0.09%	0.09%	0.09%	0.20%
Other race alone (NH)	0	12	32	18	114	0.00%	0.06%	0.15%	0.09%	0.58%
Mixed race or Multiracial (NH)	x	x	442	583	1,111	x	x	2.12%	2.91%	5.61%
Hispanic or Latino (any race)	636	907	1,177	1,605	1,897	3.67%	4.59%	5.65%	8.02%	9.59%
Total	17,340	19,739	20,824	20,007	19,790	100.00%	100.00%	100.00%	100.00%	100.00%

=== American Community Survey 2025 data ===
The United States Census Bureau estimated that in 2025, Plumas County’s population was 18.583. It was also estimated that the county's population was 79,83% Non-Hispanic White, 11,45% Hispanic or Latino, 0,75% Non-Hispanic Black, 0,91% Asian, 2,06% Native American, 0,34% Pacific Islander, and 4,65% Multiracial.

Total	Population	Percentage
Non-Hispanic White	14.835	79,83%
Hispanic or Latino	2.127	11,45%
Non-Hispanic Black	140	0,75%
Asian	170	0,91%
Native American	383	2,06%
Pacific Islander	64	0,34%
Non-Hispanic Multiracial	864	4,65%

As of the 2020 census, the county had a population of 19,790. The median age was 53.0 years, 17.4% of residents were under the age of 18, and 29.8% of residents were 65 years of age or older. For every 100 females there were 101.1 males, and for every 100 females age 18 and over there were 100.4 males age 18 and over.

The racial makeup of the county was 83.9% White, 0.5% Black or African American, 2.3% American Indian and Alaska Native, 0.8% Asian, 0.2% Native Hawaiian and Pacific Islander, 3.0% from some other race, and 9.2% from two or more races. Hispanic or Latino residents of any race comprised 9.6% of the population.

0.0% of residents lived in urban areas, while 100.0% lived in rural areas.

There were 9,216 households in the county, of which 21.5% had children under the age of 18 living with them and 24.8% had a female householder with no spouse or partner present. About 33.5% of all households were made up of individuals and 16.9% had someone living alone who was 65 years of age or older.

There were 15,396 housing units, of which 40.1% were vacant. Among occupied housing units, 70.4% were owner-occupied and 29.6% were renter-occupied. The homeowner vacancy rate was 3.1% and the rental vacancy rate was 6.5%.

=== 2010 census ===
The 2010 United States census reported that Plumas County had a population of 20,007. The racial makeup of Plumas County was 17,797 (89.0%) White, 192 (1.0%) African American, 539 (2.7%) Native American, 134 (0.7%) Asian, 18 (0.1%) Pacific Islander, 603 (3.0%) from other races, and 724 (3.6%) from two or more races. There were 1,605 Hispanic or Latino residents of any race (8.0%).

=== 2000 census ===
As of the census of 2000, there were 20,824 people, 9,000 households, and 6,047 families residing in the county. The population density was 8 people per square mile (3.1 people/km^{2}). There were 13,386 housing units at an average density of 5 units per square mile (1.9 units/km^{2}). The racial makeup of the county was 91.8% White, 0.6% Black or African American, 2.6% Native American, 0.5% Asian, 0.1% Pacific Islander, 1.8% from other races, and 2.6% from two or more races. 5.7% of the population were Hispanic or Latino of any race. 16.1% were of German, 15.0% English, 10.1% Irish and 8.0% American ancestry according to Census 2000. 95.4% spoke English and 3.6% Spanish as their first language.

There were 9,000 households, out of which 26.4% had children under the age of 18 living with them, 55.4% were married couples living together, 8.0% had a female householder with no husband present, and 32.8% were non-families. 27.5% of all households were made up of individuals, and 10.1% had someone living alone who was 65 years of age or older. The average household size was 2.29 and the average family size was 2.77.

In the county, 22.7% of residents ts were under the age of 18, 6.0% from 18 to 24, 22.6% from 25 to 44, 30.8% from 45 to 64, and 17.9% were 65 years of age or older. The median age was 44 years. For every 100 females there were 99.8 males. For every 100 females age 18 and over, there were 97.9 males.

The median income for a household in the county was $36,351, and the median income for a family was $46,119. Males had a median income of $38,742 versus $25,734 for females. The per capita income for the county was $19,391. About 9.0% of families and 13.1% of the population were below the poverty line, including 16.7% of those under age 18 and 6.4% of those age 65 or over.

== Law and government ==
Plumas County has five elected Supervisors, each elected within their own district. The Board of Supervisors oversees the management of county government and members serve four-year terms. The Clerk of the Board of Supervisors provides support to the Board of Supervisors and information to the public.

The County Administrative Office's purpose is to facilitate the delivery of cost-effective county services in accordance with the vision and policies outlined by the Board of Supervisors. Its responsibilities include monitoring legislative affairs, preparing the county's annual budget, and undertaking studies and investigations for the Board of Supervisors.

The sheriff is the chief law enforcement officer of the county. The sheriff's jurisdiction extends throughout the county, including federal and state lands. The county sheriff is elected to the nonpartisan office for a four-year term and is charged with preserving the peace, enforcing criminal statutes, and investigating known or suspected criminal activity.

More than three-quarters of Plumas County's 2,618 square miles (6,780 km^{2}) is National Forest Service land. The management of Plumas National Forest is overseen by three districts: Beckwourth Ranger District, Mt. Hough Ranger District, and Feather River Ranger District.

== Politics ==
=== Voter registration ===
Population and registered voters
Total population	20,192	
Registered voters (Note: Percentage of registered voters with respect to total population. Percentages of party members with respect to registered voters follow.)	13,012	64.4%
Democratic	4,068	31.3%
Republican	5,528	42.5%
Democratic–Republican spread	-1,460	-11.2%
American Independent	644	4.9%
Green	90	0.7%
Libertarian	99	0.8%
Peace and Freedom	39	0.3%
Americans Elect	2	0.0%
Other	0	0.0%
No party preference	2,542	19.5%

==== Cities by population and voter registration ====
[data missing]

Cities by population and voter registration
City	Population	Registered voters	Democratic	Republican	D–R spread	Other	No party preference
Portola	2,082	35.1%	55.0%	32.9%	+0.2%	9.9%	24.2%

=== Overview ===
In its early history, Plumas was a reliable Republican county, voting for that party in every election from 1864 to 1908. It then became one of the most reliably Democratic counties in California, voting for the Democratic nominee for president in 13 straight elections from 1928 to 1976. The county has voted Republican in every presidential election since 1980, except for 1992, when Bill Clinton won a small plurality.

United States presidential election results for Plumas County, California
Year	Republican		Democratic		Third party(ies)	
Year	No.	%	No.	%	No.	%
1892	642	52.15%	537	43.62%	52	4.22%
1896	678	53.47%	575	45.35%	15	1.18%
1900	640	58.45%	442	40.37%	13	1.19%
1904	707	65.28%	347	32.04%	29	2.68%
1908	659	57.91%	395	34.71%	84	7.38%
1912	11	0.62%	742	41.66%	1,028	57.72%
1916	663	36.55%	1,025	56.50%	126	6.95%
1920	999	63.96%	403	25.80%	160	10.24%
1924	564	32.92%	182	10.62%	967	56.45%
1928	947	45.64%	1,079	52.00%	49	2.36%
1932	582	21.68%	2,035	75.82%	67	2.50%
1936	680	19.80%	2,707	78.81%	48	1.40%
1940	1,270	26.79%	3,418	72.11%	52	1.10%
1944	1,126	29.95%	2,625	69.83%	8	0.21%
1948	1,657	32.76%	3,125	61.78%	276	5.46%
1952	2,687	43.46%	3,435	55.56%	61	0.99%
1956	2,267	41.87%	3,127	57.75%	21	0.39%
1960	2,015	37.47%	3,333	61.97%	30	0.56%
1964	1,686	29.51%	4,019	70.35%	8	0.14%
1968	2,097	37.37%	2,961	52.77%	553	9.86%
1972	2,952	46.42%	3,057	48.07%	351	5.52%
1976	2,884	43.94%	3,429	52.25%	250	3.81%
1980	4,182	51.24%	2,911	35.67%	1,068	13.09%
1984	5,224	56.61%	3,837	41.58%	167	1.81%
1988	4,603	51.06%	4,251	47.15%	161	1.79%
1992	3,599	36.17%	3,742	37.61%	2,608	26.21%
1996	4,905	50.31%	3,540	36.31%	1,305	13.38%
2000	6,343	60.98%	3,458	33.25%	600	5.77%
2004	6,905	61.71%	4,129	36.90%	156	1.39%
2008	6,035	54.72%	4,715	42.75%	278	2.52%
2012	5,721	56.94%	4,026	40.07%	300	2.99%
2016	5,420	56.01%	3,459	35.75%	797	8.24%
2020	6,445	57.24%	4,561	40.51%	254	2.26%
2024	5,725	56.85%	4,020	39.92%	325	3.23%

Plumas County is in California's 3rd congressional district, represented by Independent Kevin Kiley. At the state level, Plumas is in the 1st Senate District, represented by Republican Ted Gaines, and the 1st Assembly district, represented by Republican Heather Hadwick.

== Crime ==
The following table includes the number of incidents reported and the rate per 1,000 persons for each type of offense.

Population and crime rates
Population	20,192	
Violent crime	121	5.99
Homicide	1	0.05
Forcible rape	19	0.94
Robbery	5	0.25
Aggravated assault	96	4.75
Property crime	205	10.15
Burglary	122	6.04
Larceny-theft	192	9.51
Motor vehicle theft	19	0.94
Arson	2	0.10

== Culture ==
- The town of Portola is home to the Western Pacific Railroad Museum, one of the largest railroad museums in North America. It is one of the county's major tourist attractions.
- The town of Chester is home to the Collins Pine Museum, completed in 2007 and dedicated to educating the public about the history of the Collins Pine Company's (a division of The Collins Companies) logging operations in the Chester region.
- The Plumas County Museum in Quincy is notable for exhibits on the Maidu people, the California Gold Rush, logging, and the Variel House. It also hosts contemporary art exhibits.

== Media ==
The primary local news source since 1866 is Feather Publishing Co., Inc. Until 2020, four Plumas County newspapers were published every Wednesday, except for certain holidays; all content was available online instead at plumasnews.com until June 29, 2023, when Plumas News announced it was shutting down. Feather Publishing will continue to release High Country Life, The Dining Guide, The Visitor Guide, maps, and more while also providing commercial printing to the local community.

Plumas County is in the Sacramento television market, and thus receives Sacramento media. Sacramento stations KXTV and KCRA regularly cover major news events in Plumas County.

== Education ==
- Feather River College

School districts include Plumas Unified School District and Sierra-Plumas Joint Unified School District.

== Transportation ==
=== Major highways ===
- State Route 36
- State Route 49
- State Route 70
- State Route 89
- State Route 147
- State Route 284

=== Scenic byways ===
The Feather River National Scenic Byway follows the Middle and North Forks of the Feather River, traversing steep canyon walls and high mountain valleys. The route features grasslands, oak woodlands, mixed conifer, and high desert chaparral. It begins in the Sacramento Valley, following the Feather River Canyon and entering Plumas County just west of Storrie. As it gains elevation, it climbs over the crest of the Sierra and passes through Quincy and Portola, eventually reaching the Middle Fork of the Feather River and following it to its headwaters in Sierra Valley. After going through Beckwourth Pass, the route terminates at Hallelujah Junction on Highway 395.

The southernmost point of the Volcanic Legacy Scenic Byway, Lake Almanor, is in Plumas County. The route spans 500 miles between California and Oregon and has views of dramatic volcanic landscapes, including nearby Lassen Peak.

The Scenic Byway Link is the section of Highway 89 that connects the Volcanic Legacy and Feather River Scenic Byways. Featuring the alpine meadows of Indian Valley, the rushing waters of Indian Creek, and views of Mt. Hough and the surrounding mountains, the route is about 18 miles long.

=== Public transit ===
Plumas Transit Systems, operated by the county, provides local service in Quincy and routes to Chester and Portola.

=== Airports ===
Gansner Field is a general aviation airport near Quincy. Rogers Field is near Chester; in addition to its civil-aviation role it also serves as the Chester Air Attack Base, a logistical and coordination facility for the California Department of Forestry's aerial firefighting (both fixed-wing and helicopter). Resources include fueling, retardant loading, communications, and some quartering for aircrew and ground firefighting teams. Nervino Airport is in Beckwourth, east of Portola. The closest major airport is in Reno.

== Communities ==
=== City ===
- Portola

=== Census-designated places ===
- Beckwourth
- Belden
- Blairsden
- Bucks Lake
- Canyondam
- Caribou
- Chester
- Chilcoot-Vinton
- Clio
- Crescent Mills
- C-Road
- Cromberg
- Delleker
- East Quincy
- East Shore
- Gold Mountain
- Graeagle
- Greenhorn
- Greenville
- Hamilton Branch
- Indian Falls
- Iron Horse
- Johnsville
- Keddie
- La Porte
- Lake Almanor Country Club
- Lake Almanor Peninsula
- Lake Almanor West
- Lake Davis
- Little Grass Valley
- Mabie
- Meadow Valley
- Mohawk Vista
- Paxton
- Plumas Eureka
- Prattville
- Quincy (county seat)
- Spring Garden
- Taylorsville
- Tobin
- Twain
- Valley Ranch
- Warner Valley
- Whitehawk

=== Former census designated places ===
- Storrie

=== Unincorporated communities ===
- Buckeye
- Cascade
- Drakesbad
- Feather River Park
- Genesee
- Longville
- Palmetto
- Seneca
- Sloat
- Spanish Ranch

=== Ghost towns ===
- Almanor (also CDP)

=== Population ranking ===
The population ranking of the following table is based on the 2010 census of Plumas County.

† county seat

Rank	City/Town/etc.	Municipal type	Population (2019 estimate)
1	East Quincy	CDP	2,210
2	Chester	CDP	2,145
5	Portola	City	1,913
4	† Quincy	CDP	1,952
6	Greenville	CDP	817
7	Graeagle	CDP	538
10	Delleker	CDP	477
8	Hamilton Branch	CDP	495
12	Meadow Valley	CDP	420
11	Chilcoot-Vinton	CDP	422
13	Beckwourth	CDP	414
14	Lake Almanor Country Club	CDP	408
9	Lake Almanor Peninsula	CDP	485
15	Plumas Eureka	CDP	364
21	Iron Horse	CDP	191
19	Lake Almanor West	CDP	224
17	Cromberg	CDP	316
18	Greenhorn	CDP	255
24	Crescent Mills	CDP	93
33	Mabie	CDP	25
28	Mohawk Vista	CDP	54
23	East Shore	CDP	128
22	C-Road	CDP	140
20	Taylorsville	CDP	198
31	Whitehawk	CDP	49
37	Valley Ranch	CDP	0
16	Twain	CDP	327
25	Gold Mountain	CDP	80
t-27	Clio	CDP	59
t-26	Keddie	CDP	76
29	Indian Falls	CDP	53
30	Lake Davis	CDP	52
35	Blairsden	CDP	18
t-3	Greenville Rancheria (Maidu Indians)	AIAN	2,000
t-32	Prattville	CDP	28
37	Canyondam	CDP	0
37	La Porte	CDP	65
37	Belden	CDP	0
37	Johnsville	CDP	0
34	Spring Garden	CDP	20
37	Paxton	CDP	0
37	Tobin	CDP	0
37	Bucks Lake	CDP	0
37	Storrie	CDP	0
t-37	Little Grass Valley	CDP	0
t-36	Warner Valley	CDP	2
t-37	Almanor	former CDP	0
t-37	Caribou	CDP	0

== See also ==
- The Lost Sierra
- List of school districts in Plumas County, California
- National Register of Historic Places listings in Plumas County, California
- Western Pacific Railroad Museum
