= Whitehawk, California =

Whitehawk
- Unincorporated Community; Census Designated Place
- Location in Plumas County and the state of California

- Location in the United States
- Coordinates: 39°43′23″N 120°32′56″W
- Country: United States
- State: California
- County: Plumas

Area
  - Total: 2.585 sq mi (6.694 km^{2})
  - Land: 2.585 sq mi (6.694 km^{2})
  - Water: 0 sq mi (0 km^{2}) 0%
- Elevation: 4,501 ft (1,372 m)

Population (2020)
  - Total: 144
  - Density: 55.7/sq mi (21.5/km^{2})
- Time zone: UTC-8 (Pacific (PST))
  - Summer (DST): UTC-7 (PDT)
- ZIP code: 95758
- Area code: 530
- FIPS code: 06-85086
- GNIS feature ID: 1853421

Whitehawk is a census-designated place in Plumas County, California, United States. The population was 144 at the 2020 census, up from 113 at the 2010 census.

== Geography ==
Whitehawk is located at 39°43′23″N 120°32′56″W (39.723136, -120.548805).

According to the United States Census Bureau, the CDP has a total area of 2.6 square miles (6.7 km^{2}), all land.

== Demographics ==
Historical population
| Census | Pop. | Note | %± |
|---|---|---|---|
| 2000 | 96 | | — |
| 2010 | 113 | | 17.7% |
| 2020 | 144 | | 27.4% |
U.S. Decennial Census; 1860–1870 1880-1890; 1900 1910 1920; 1930 1940 1950; 1960 1970 1980; 1990 2000 2010

Whitehawk first appeared as a census designated place in the 2000 U.S. census.

=== 2020 ===
Whitehawk CDP, California – Racial and ethnic composition Note: the US Census treats Hispanic/Latino as an ethnic category. This table excludes Latinos from the racial categories and assigns them to a separate category. Hispanics/Latinos may be of any race.
| Race / Ethnicity (NH = Non-Hispanic) | Pop 2000 | Pop 2010 | Pop 2020 | % 2000 | % 2010 | % 2020 |
|---|---|---|---|---|---|---|
| White alone (NH) | 95 | 106 | 137 | 98.96% | 93.81% | 95.14% |
| Black or African American alone (NH) | 0 | 0 | 0 | 0.00% | 0.00% | 0.00% |
| Native American or Alaska Native alone (NH) | 0 | 0 | 0 | 0.00% | 0.00% | 0.00% |
| Asian alone (NH) | 1 | 1 | 0 | 1.04% | 0.88% | 0.00% |
| Native Hawaiian or Pacific Islander alone (NH) | 0 | 0 | 0 | 0.00% | 0.00% | 0.00% |
| Other race alone (NH) | 0 | 0 | 0 | 0.00% | 0.00% | 0.00% |
| Mixed race or Multiracial (NH) | 0 | 4 | 6 | 0.00% | 3.54% | 4.17% |
| Hispanic or Latino (any race) | 0 | 2 | 1 | 0.00% | 1.77% | 0.69% |
| Total | 96 | 113 | 144 | 100.00% | 100.00% | 100.00% |

=== 2010 ===
At the 2010 census Whitehawk had a population of 113. The population density was 44.7 inhabitants per square mile (17.3/km^{2}). The racial makeup of Whitehawk was 107 (94.7%) White, 0 (0.0%) African American, 0 (0.0%) Native American, 1 (0.9%) Asian, 0 (0.0%) Pacific Islander, 1 (0.9%) from other races, and 4 (3.5%) from two or more races. Hispanic or Latino of any race were 2 people (1.8%).

The whole population lived in households, no one lived in non-institutionalized group quarters and no one was institutionalized.

There were 59 households, 4 (6.8%) had children under the age of 18 living in them, 43 (72.9%) were opposite-sex married couples living together, 0 (0%) had a female householder with no husband present, 0 (0%) had a male householder with no wife present. There were 2 (3.4%) unmarried opposite-sex partnerships, and 0 (0%) same-sex married couples or partnerships. 14 households (23.7%) were one person and 7 (11.9%) had someone living alone who was 65 or older. The average household size was 1.92. There were 43 families (72.9% of households); the average family size was 2.21.

The age distribution was 9 people (8.0%) under the age of 18, 0 people (0%) aged 18 to 24, 4 people (3.5%) aged 25 to 44, 42 people (37.2%) aged 45 to 64, and 58 people (51.3%) who were 65 or older. The median age was 65.3 years. For every 100 females, there were 85.2 males. For every 100 females age 18 and over, there were 89.1 males.

There were 184 housing units at an average density of 72.7 per square mile, of the occupied units 52 (88.1%) were owner-occupied and 7 (11.9%) were rented. The homeowner vacancy rate was 15.9%; the rental vacancy rate was 30.0%. 97 people (85.8% of the population) lived in owner-occupied housing units and 16 people (14.2%) lived in rental housing units.

=== 2000 ===
At the 2000 census there were 96 people, 49 households, and 39 families in the CDP. The population density was 55.8 inhabitants per square mile (21.5/km^{2}). There were 102 housing units at an average density of 59.3 per square mile (22.9/km^{2}). The racial makeup of the CDP was 98.96% White and 1.04% Asian. Of the 49 households 4.1% had children under the age of 18 living with them, 81.6% were married couples living together, and 18.4% were non-families. 16.3% of households were one person and none had someone living alone who was 65 or older. The average household size was 1.96 and the average family size was 2.15.

The age distribution was 3.1% under the age of 18, 1.0% from 18 to 24, 10.4% from 25 to 44, 50.0% from 45 to 64, and 35.4% 65 or older. The median age was 61 years. For every 100 females, there were 100.0 males. For every 100 females age 18 and over, there were 102.2 males.

The median household income was $46,696 and the median family income was $46,071. Males had a median income of $0 versus $0 for females. The per capita income for the CDP was $36,515. None of the population and none of the families were below the poverty line.

== Media ==
The primary local news source is the Portola Reporter, a newspaper published every Wednesday.

== Politics ==
In the state legislature, Whitehawk is in the 1st senatorial district, represented by Republican Megan Dahle, and the 1st Assembly district, represented by Republican Heather Hadwick.

Federally, Whitehawk is in California's 3rd congressional district, represented by Independent Kevin Kiley.

== Education ==
The school district is Plumas Unified School District.
