= Twain, California =

Twain
- Unincorporated Community; Census Designated Place
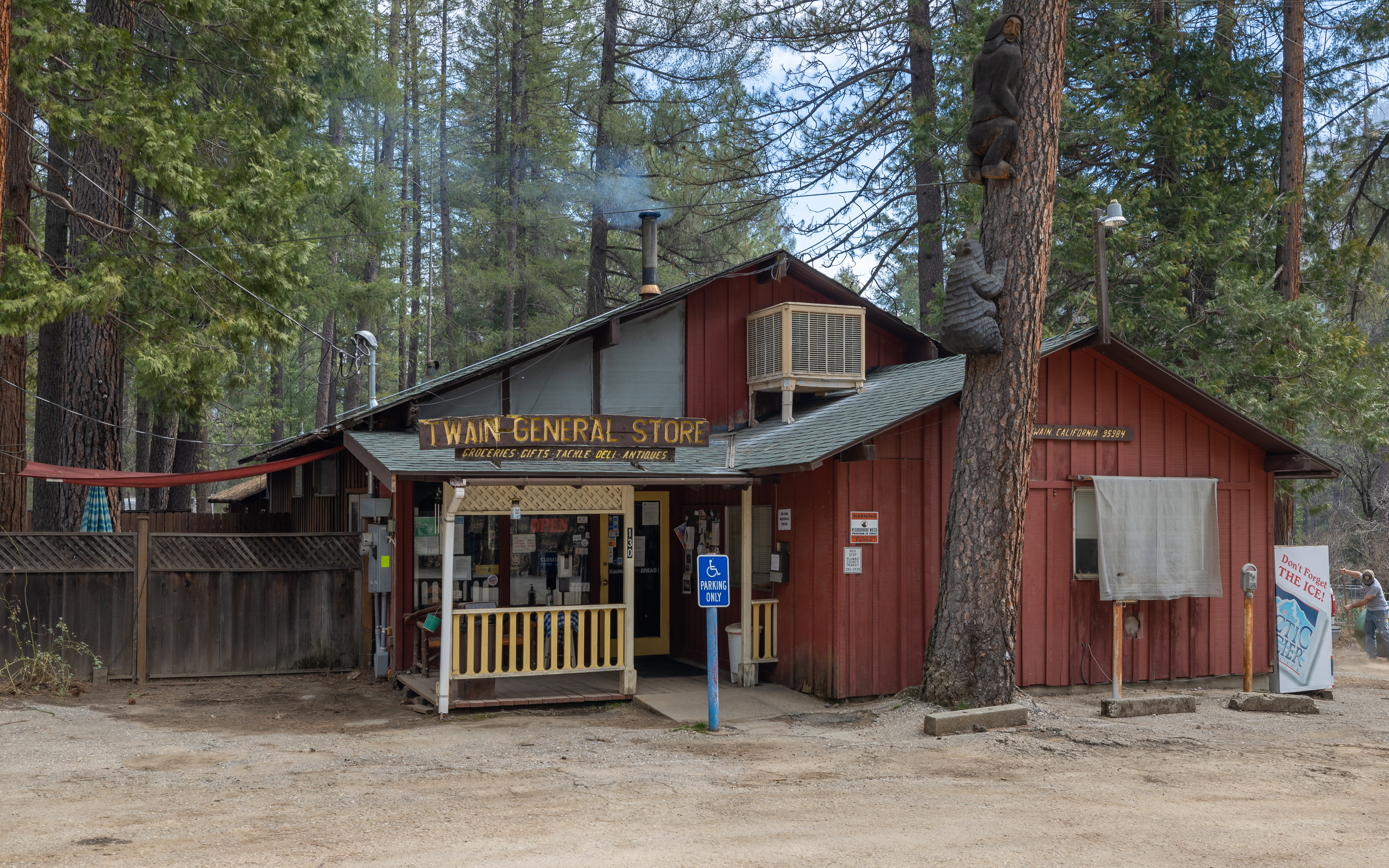
- The Twain General Store in February 2022

- Location in Plumas County and the state of California

- Location in the United States
- Coordinates: 40°1′5″N 121°2′56″W
- Country: United States
- State: California
- County: Plumas

Area
  - Total: 7.190 sq mi (18.623 km^{2})
  - Land: 7.190 sq mi (18.623 km^{2})
  - Water: 0 sq mi (0 km^{2}) 0%
- Elevation: 2,858 ft (871 m)

Population (2020)
  - Total: 75
  - Density: 10/sq mi (4.0/km^{2})
- Time zone: UTC-8 (Pacific (PST))
  - Summer (DST): UTC-7 (PDT)
- ZIP code: 95984
- Area code: 530
- FIPS code: 06-80952
- GNIS feature ID: 0224823

Twain is a census-designated place (CDP) in Plumas County, California, United States. As of the 2020 census, the CDP population was 75, down from 82 at the 2010 census.

== Geography ==
Twain is located at 40°1′5″N 121°2′56″W (40.018101, -121.048898).

According to the United States Census Bureau, the CDP has a total area of 7.2 square miles (19 km^{2}), all land.

=== Climate ===
Twain experiences warm and dry summers, with no average monthly temperatures above 71.6 °F. According to the Köppen Climate Classification system, Twain has a warm-summer Mediterranean climate, abbreviated "Csb" on climate maps.

== Demographics ==
Historical population
Census	Pop.	Note	%±
2000	87		—
2010	82		−5.7%
2020	75		−8.5%
U.S. Decennial Census; 1860–1870 1880-1890; 1900 1910 1920; 1930 1940 1950; 1960 1970 1980; 1990 2000 2010

Twain first appeared as a census designated place in the 2000 U.S. census.

=== 2020 ===
Twain CDP, California – Racial and ethnic composition Note: the US Census treats Hispanic/Latino as an ethnic category. This table excludes Latinos from the racial categories and assigns them to a separate category. Hispanics/Latinos may be of any race.
Race / Ethnicity (NH = Non-Hispanic)	Pop 2000	Pop 2010	Pop 2020	% 2000	% 2010	% 2020
White alone (NH)	83	65	62	95.40%	79.27%	82.67%
Black or African American alone (NH)	0	0	0	0.00%	0.00%	0.00%
Native American or Alaska Native alone (NH)	0	2	5	0.00%	2.44%	6.67%
Asian alone (NH)	0	0	1	0.00%	0.00%	1.33%
Native Hawaiian or Pacific Islander alone (NH)	0	0	0	0.00%	0.00%	0.00%
Other race alone (NH)	0	0	1	0.00%	0.00%	1.33%
Mixed race or Multiracial (NH)	2	1	2	2.30%	1.22%	2.67%
Hispanic or Latino (any race)	2	14	4	2.30%	17.07%	5.33%
Total	87	82	75	100.00%	100.00%	100.00%

The 2020 United States census reported that Twain had a population of 75. The population density was 10.4 inhabitants per square mile (4.0/km^{2}). The racial makeup of Twain was 64 (85%) White, 0 (0%) African American, 5 (7%) Native American, 1 (1%) Asian, 0 (0%) Pacific Islander, 3 (4%) from other races, and 2 (3%) from two or more races. Hispanic or Latino of any race were 4 persons (5%).

There were 32 households, out of which 5 (16%) had children under the age of 18 living in them, 9 (28%) were married-couple households, 6 (19%) were cohabiting couple households, 6 (19%) had a female householder with no partner present, and 11 (34%) had a male householder with no partner present. 12 households (38%) were one person, and 10 (31%) were one person aged 65 or older. The average household size was 2.34. There were 14 families (44% of all households).

The age distribution was 10 people (13%) under the age of 18, 4 people (5%) aged 18 to 24, 8 people (11%) aged 25 to 44, 21 people (28%) aged 45 to 64, and 32 people (43%) who were 65 years of age or older. The median age was 62.2 years. There were 31 males and 44 females.

There were 43 housing units at an average density of 6.0 units per square mile (2.3 units/km^{2}), of which 32 (74%) were occupied. Of these, 12 were owner-occupied and 20 were occupied by renters.

At the 2000 census, the median household income was $16,071 and the median family income was $10,313. The per capita income for the CDP was $19,472. There were 70.6% of families and 72.1% of the population living below the poverty line, including no under eighteens and 100.0% of those over 64.

== Politics ==
In the state legislature, Twain is in the 1st senatorial district, represented by Republican Megan Dahle, and the 1st Assembly district, represented by Republican Heather Hadwick.

Federally, Twain is in California's 3rd congressional district, represented by Independent Kevin Kiley.

== Education ==
Twain’s school district is Plumas Unified School District.
