= Mohawk, California =

Unincorporated community in California, United States

Mohawk
- Unincorporated community
- Location in California Mohawk (the United States)
- Coordinates: 39°46′44″N 120°38′08″W
- Country: United States
- State: California
- County: Plumas
- Elevation: 4,360 ft (1,329 m)

Mohawk (formerly, Mohawk Valley) is an unincorporated community in Plumas County, California, United States. It lies at an elevation of 4360 feet (1329 m). Mohawk is located 1 mile (1.6 km) west of Blairsden.

The Mohawk Valley post office opened in 1870 and changed its name to Mohawk when it moved in 1881. The Mohawk post office closed in 1926.
