= Little Grass Valley, California =

Little Grass Valley
- Unincorporated Community; Census Designated Place
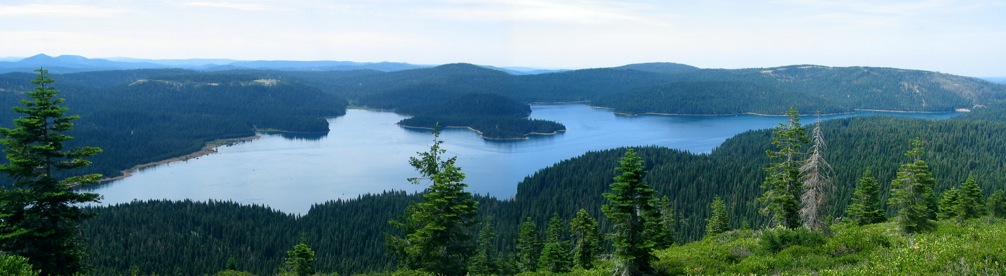
- Little Grass Valley Reservoir as seen from atop nearby Bald Mountain

- Location in Plumas County and the state of California

- Location in the United States
- Coordinates: 39°42′59″N 120°58′35″W
- Country: United States
- State: California
- County: Plumas

Area
  - Total: 9.999 sq mi (25.897 km^{2})
  - Land: 9.999 sq mi (25.897 km^{2})
  - Water: 0 sq mi (0 km^{2}) 0%

Population (2020)
  - Total: 25
  - Density: 2.5/sq mi (0.97/km^{2})
- Time zone: UTC-8 (Pacific (PST))
  - Summer (DST): UTC-7 (PDT)
- ZIP code: 96053
- Area code: 530
- FIPS code: 06-41789

Little Grass Valley is a census-designated place in Plumas County, California, United States. As of the 2020 census, it had a total population of 25.

== Geography ==
According to the United States Census Bureau, the CDP has a total area of 10.0 square miles (26 km^{2}), all land. It is on the east side of the Little Grass Valley Reservoir, which covers about 1,600 acres (6.5 km^{2}; 2.5 mi^{2}).

== Demographics ==
Historical population
Census	Pop.	Note	%±
2000	0		—
2010	2		—
2020	25		1,150.0%
U.S. Decennial Census; 1860–1870 1880-1890; 1900 1910 1920; 1930 1940 1950; 1960 1970 1980; 1990 2000 2010

Little Grass Valley first appeared as a census designated place in the 2000 U.S. census.

=== 2020 ===
Little Grass Valley CDP, California – Racial and ethnic composition Note: the US Census treats Hispanic/Latino as an ethnic category. This table excludes Latinos from the racial categories and assigns them to a separate category. Hispanics/Latinos may be of any race.
Race / Ethnicity (NH = Non-Hispanic)	Pop 2000	Pop 2010	Pop 2020	% 2000	% 2010	% 2020
White alone (NH)	0	2	19	0.00%	100.00%	76.00%
Black or African American alone (NH)	0	0	0	0.00%	0.00%	0.00%
Native American or Alaska Native alone (NH)	0	0	0	0.00%	0.00%	0.00%
Asian alone (NH)	0	0	1	0.00%	0.00%	4.00%
Native Hawaiian or Pacific Islander alone (NH)	0	0	0	0.00%	0.00%	0.00%
Other race alone (NH)	0	0	0	0.00%	0.00%	0.00%
Mixed race or Multiracial (NH)	0	0	0	0.00%	0.00%	0.00%
Hispanic or Latino (any race)	0	0	5	0.00%	0.00%	20.00%
Total	0	2	25	100.00%	100.00%	100.00%

The 2020 United States census reported that Little Grass Valley had a population of 25. The population density was 2.5 inhabitants per square mile (0.97/km^{2}). Of the population, 19 people (76%) were White, 1 (4%) was Asian, and 5 (20%) were Hispanic or Latino.

There were 11 households, of which 4 were families and 6 were one person living alone. The median age was 57.5 years.

There were 147 housing units at an average density of 14.7 units per square mile (5.7 units/km^{2}), of which 11 (7.5%) were occupied year round, and 136 (92.5%) were used seasonally.

=== Pre-2020 ===
Little Grass Valley was initially occupied by the Maidu Native American tribe during the summers. During the California Gold Rush, it became a mining camp. The camp disappeared before 1900, but there are still gold mines in the area. The land in the valley was used to graze cattle and there was a Boy Scout Camp located on the banks of the South Fork of the Feather River. In 1963 the whole area was flooded and a lake filled the valley. Today there are campgrounds all around the lake, cabins on the south side, and it is the center of a snowmobiling area. It is about three miles (4.8 km) from La Porte (population 43).

== Politics ==
In the state legislature, Little Grass Valley is in the 1st senatorial district, represented by Republican Megan Dahle, and the 1st Assembly district, represented by Republican Heather Hadwick.

Federally, Little Grass Valley is in California's 3rd congressional district, represented by Independent Kevin Kiley.

== Fowler Lake ==
Fowler Lake

About 2.5 miles (4.0 km) north of Little Grass Valley Lake lies a small, natural lily pond called Fowler Lake. Its coordinates are 39°46′27″N 121°00′19″W, and its altitude is 5,446 feet (1,660 m).

== Education ==
The school district is Plumas Unified School District.

== See also ==
- Grass Valley, California

== Sources ==
- Little Grass Valley Lake Recreation Area
