= Meadow Valley, California =

Meadow Valley
- Unincorporated Community; Census Designated Place
- Location in Plumas County and the state of California

- Location in the United States
- Coordinates: 39°56′13″N 121°3′43″W
- Country: United States
- State: California
- County: Plumas

Area
  - Total: 8.520 sq mi (22.066 km^{2})
  - Land: 8.520 sq mi (22.066 km^{2})
  - Water: 0 sq mi (0 km^{2}) 0%
- Elevation: 3,776 ft (1,151 m)

Population (2020)
  - Total: 453
  - Density: 53.2/sq mi (20.5/km^{2})
- Time zone: UTC-8 (Pacific (PST))
  - Summer (DST): UTC-7 (PDT)
- ZIP code: 95956
- Area code: 530
- FIPS code: 06-46618
- GNIS feature ID: 1659096

Meadow Valley is a census-designated place (CDP) in Plumas County, California, United States. The population was 453 at the 2020 census, down from 464 at the 2010 census.

== Geography ==
Meadow Valley is located at 39°56′13″N 121°3′43″W (39.936921, -121.062051).

According to the United States Census Bureau, the CDP has a total area of 8.5 square miles (22 km^{2}), all land.

=== Climate ===
This region experiences warm (but not hot) and dry summers, with no average monthly temperatures above 71.6 °F. According to the Köppen Climate Classification system, Meadow Valley has a warm-summer Mediterranean climate, abbreviated "Csb" on climate maps.

== Demographics ==
Historical population
| Census | Pop. | Note | %± |
|---|---|---|---|
| 2000 | 575 | | — |
| 2010 | 435 | | −24.3% |
| 2020 | 453 | | 4.1% |
U.S. Decennial Census; 1860–1870 1880-1890; 1900 1910 1920; 1930 1940 1950; 1960 1970 1980; 1990 2000 2010

Meadow Valley first appeared as a census designated place in the 2000 U.S. census.

=== 2020 ===
Meadow Valley CDP, California – Racial and ethnic composition Note: the US Census treats Hispanic/Latino as an ethnic category. This table excludes Latinos from the racial categories and assigns them to a separate category. Hispanics/Latinos may be of any race.
| Race / Ethnicity (NH = Non-Hispanic) | Pop 2000 | Pop 2010 | Pop 2020 | % 2000 | % 2010 | % 2020 |
|---|---|---|---|---|---|---|
| White alone (NH) | 528 | 423 | 382 | 91.83% | 91.16% | 84.33% |
| Black or African American alone (NH) | 1 | 0 | 4 | 0.17% | 0.00% | 0.88% |
| Native American or Alaska Native alone (NH) | 13 | 9 | 8 | 2.26% | 1.94% | 1.77% |
| Asian alone (NH) | 1 | 0 | 5 | 0.17% | 0.00% | 1.10% |
| Native Hawaiian or Pacific Islander alone (NH) | 0 | 0 | 0 | 0.00% | 0.00% | 0.00% |
| Other race alone (NH) | 0 | 0 | 3 | 0.00% | 0.00% | 0.66% |
| Mixed race or Multiracial (NH) | 8 | 11 | 22 | 1.39% | 2.37% | 4.86% |
| Hispanic or Latino (any race) | 24 | 21 | 29 | 4.17% | 4.53% | 6.40% |
| Total | 575 | 464 | 453 | 100.00% | 100.00% | 100.00% |

The 2020 United States census reported that Meadow Valley had a population of 453. The population density was 53.2 inhabitants per square mile (20.5/km^{2}). The racial makeup of Meadow Valley was 390 (86.1%) White, 4 (0.9%) African American, 8 (1.8%) Native American, 5 (1.1%) Asian, 0 (0.0%) Pacific Islander, 16 (3.5%) from other races, and 30 (6.6%) from two or more races. Hispanic or Latino of any race were 29 persons (6.4%).

The whole population lived in households. There were 217 households, out of which 30 (13.8%) had children under the age of 18 living in them, 104 (47.9%) were married-couple households, 21 (9.7%) were cohabiting couple households, 46 (21.2%) had a female householder with no partner present, and 46 (21.2%) had a male householder with no partner present. 75 households (34.6%) were one person, and 32 (14.7%) were one person aged 65 or older. The average household size was 2.09. There were 127 families (58.5% of all households).

The age distribution was 65 people (14.3%) under the age of 18, 11 people (2.4%) aged 18 to 24, 74 people (16.3%) aged 25 to 44, 160 people (35.3%) aged 45 to 64, and 143 people (31.6%) who were 65 years of age or older. The median age was 57.8 years. For every 100 females, there were 93.6 males.

There were 277 housing units at an average density of 32.5 units per square mile (12.5 units/km^{2}), of which 217 (78.3%) were occupied. Of these, 180 (82.9%) were owner-occupied, and 37 (17.1%) were occupied by renters.

=== 2010 ===
The 2010 United States census reported that Meadow Valley had a population of 464. The population density was 54.5 inhabitants per square mile (21.0/km^{2}). The racial makeup of Meadow Valley was 435 (93.8%) White, 0 (0.0%) African American, 13 (2.8%) Native American, 0 (0.0%) Asian, 0 (0.0%) Pacific Islander, 4 (0.9%) from other races, and 12 (2.6%) from two or more races. Hispanic or Latino of any race were 21 persons (4.5%).

The Census reported that 464 people (100% of the population) lived in households, 0 (0%) lived in non-institutionalized group quarters, and 0 (0%) were institutionalized.

There were 231 households, out of which 41 (17.7%) had children under the age of 18 living in them, 115 (49.8%) were opposite-sex married couples living together, 7 (3.0%) had a female householder with no husband present, 5 (2.2%) had a male householder with no wife present. There were 15 (6.5%) unmarried opposite-sex partnerships, and 0 (0%) same-sex married couples or partnerships. 82 households (35.5%) were made up of individuals, and 39 (16.9%) had someone living alone who was 65 years of age or older. The average household size was 2.01. There were 127 families (55.0% of all households); the average family size was 2.62.

The population was spread out, with 62 people (13.4%) under the age of 18, 25 people (5.4%) aged 18 to 24, 84 people (18.1%) aged 25 to 44, 201 people (43.3%) aged 45 to 64, and 92 people (19.8%) who were 65 years of age or older. The median age was 52.4 years. For every 100 females, there were 106.2 males. For every 100 females age 18 and over, there were 104.1 males.

There were 304 housing units at an average density of 35.7 per square mile (13.8/km^{2}), of which 171 (74.0%) were owner-occupied, and 60 (26.0%) were occupied by renters. The homeowner vacancy rate was 3.4%; the rental vacancy rate was 3.2%. 351 people (75.6% of the population) lived in owner-occupied housing units and 113 people (24.4%) lived in rental housing units.

=== 2000 ===
As of the census of 2000, the median income for a household in the CDP was $33,571, and the median income for a family was $45,469. Males had a median income of $40,000 versus $30,667 for females. The per capita income for the CDP was $19,726. About 10.6% of families and 11.5% of the population were below the poverty line, including 9.8% of those under age 18 and 9.0% of those age 65 or over.

== Politics ==
In the state legislature, Meadow Valley is in the 1st senatorial district, represented by Republican Megan Dahle, and the 1st Assembly district, represented by Republican Heather Hadwick.

Federally, Meadow Valley is in California's 3rd congressional district, represented by Independent Kevin Kiley.

== Education ==
The school district is Plumas Unified School District.
