= Blairsden, California =

Blairsden
- Unincorporated Community; Census Designated Place
- Location in Plumas County and the state of California

- Location in the United States
- Coordinates: 39°46′40″N 120°36′59″W
- Country: United States
- State: California
- County: Plumas

Area
  - Total: 0.54 sq mi (1.40 km^{2})
  - Land: 0.54 sq mi (1.40 km^{2})
  - Water: 0 sq mi (0.00 km^{2}) 0%
- Elevation: 4,400 ft (1,340 m)

Population (2020)
  - Total: 38
  - Density: 70.2/sq mi (27.09/km^{2})
- Time zone: UTC-8 (Pacific (PST))
  - Summer (DST): UTC-7 (PDT)
- ZIP code: 96103
- Area codes: 530, 837
- FIPS code: 06-06994
- GNIS feature IDs: 1658075; 2407861

Blairsden is a census-designated place (CDP) in Plumas County, California, United States. Blairsden is located 20 miles (32.2 km) east-southeast of Quincy. It is located on the Feather River Route. The population was 38 at the 2020 census.

== History ==
The Blairsden post office opened in 1913. The name honors James A. Blair, a financier of the Western Pacific Railroad.

== Geography ==
Blairsden is located at 39°46′40″N 120°36′59″W (39.777736, -120.616367).

According to the United States Census Bureau, the CDP has a total area of 0.5 square miles (1.3 km^{2}), all land.

== Demographics ==
Historical population
Census	Pop.	Note	%±
2000	50		—
2010	39		−22.0%
2020	38		−2.6%
U.S. Decennial Census; 1850–1870 1880-1890; 1900 1910 1920; 1930 1940 1950; 1960 1970 1980; 1990 2000 2010

Blairsden first appeared as a census designated place in the 2000 U.S. census.

=== Racial and ethnic composition ===
Blairsden CDP, California – Racial and ethnic composition Note: the US Census treats Hispanic/Latino as an ethnic category. This table excludes Latinos from the racial categories and assigns them to a separate category. Hispanics/Latinos may be of any race.
Race / Ethnicity (NH = Non-Hispanic)	Pop 2000	Pop 2010	Pop 2020	% 2000	% 2010	% 2020
White alone (NH)	45	37	33	90.00%	94.87%	86.84%
Black or African American alone (NH)	0	0	0	0.00%	0.00%	0.00%
Native American or Alaska Native alone (NH)	0	0	0	0.00%	0.00%	0.00%
Asian alone (NH)	1	0	0	2.00%	0.00%	0.00%
Native Hawaiian or Pacific Islander alone (NH)	0	0	0	0.00%	0.00%	0.00%
Other race alone (NH)	0	0	0	0.00%	0.00%	0.00%
Mixed race or Multiracial (NH)	2	0	3	4.00%	0.00%	7.89%
Hispanic or Latino (any race)	2	2	2	4.00%	5.13%	5.26%
Total	50	39	38	100.00%	100.00%	100.00%

=== 2020 census ===
As of the 2020 census, Blairsden had a population of 38. The population density was 70.1 inhabitants per square mile (27.1/km^{2}). The median age was 72.2 years. 5.3% of residents were under the age of 18 and 55.3% of residents were 65 years of age or older. For every 100 females there were 111.1 males, and for every 100 females age 18 and over there were 125.0 males age 18 and over.

0.0% of residents lived in urban areas, while 100.0% lived in rural areas.

There were 18 households in Blairsden, of which 16.7% had children under the age of 18 living in them. Of all households, 77.8% were married-couple households, 16.7% were households with a male householder and no spouse or partner present, and 0.0% were households with a female householder and no spouse or partner present. About 11.1% of all households were made up of individuals and 5.6% had someone living alone who was 65 years of age or older. The average household size was 2.11.

There were 31 housing units, of which 18 (58.1%) were occupied—16 by owners and 2 by renters—and 41.9% were vacant. The homeowner vacancy rate was 0.0% and the rental vacancy rate was 0.0%.

== Politics ==
In the state legislature Blairsden is located in the 1st senatorial district, represented by Republican Megan Dahle, and the 1st Assembly district, represented by Republican Heather Hadwick.

Federally, Blairsden is in California's 3rd congressional district, represented by Independent Kevin Kiley.

== Education ==
The school district is Plumas Unified School District.
