= Plumas Unified School District =

School district in California, United States

Address
- 50 Church Street Quincy, California, 95971; United States

District information
- Type: Public
- Grades: K–12
- Schools: 4 Elementary, 4 Junior-Senior High
- NCES District ID: 0631170

Students and staff
- Students: 1,661 (2020–2021)
- Teachers: 99.26 (FTE)
- Staff: 117.08 (FTE)
- Student–teacher ratio: 16.73:1

Other information
- Website: www.pcoe.k12.ca.us

Plumas Unified School District is a public school district in Plumas County, California, United States.

It includes the majority of Plumas County.
