= List of census-designated places in California =

This article lists census-designated places (CDPs) in the U.S. state of California. There is also a separate section listing former census designated places. CDPs are unincorporated communities lacking elected municipal officers and boundaries with legal status. The term "census designated place" has been used as an official classification by the U.S. Census Bureau since 1980. Prior to that, select unincorporated communities were surveyed in the U.S. Census.

== Census designated places in California ==
CDP	County	Location of County	Population (2020)	Population (2010)	Population (2000)	Population (1990)	Population (1980)	Notes
Acalanes Ridge	Contra Costa		1,285	1,137	x	x	x	
Acampo	San Joaquin		334	341	x	x	x	First appeared as a census designated place in the 2010 U.S. census, one of ten CDPS (Acampo, Collierville, Dogtown, Mountain House, Peters, Terminous, Thornton, Victor, Waterloo, and Woodbridge) formed out of the deleted North Woodbridge CDP and South Woodbridge CDP.
Acton	Los Angeles		7,431	7,596	2,390	1,471	x	
Adin	Modoc		205	272	x	x	x	
Agua Dulce	Los Angeles		3,451	3,342	x	x	x	
Aguanga	Riverside		989	1,128	x	x	x	
Ahwahnee	Madera		2,296	2,246	x	x	x	
Airport	Stanislaus		1,389	1,964	x	x	x	The community first was listed as an unincorporated place under the name La-Loma Airport in the 1950 U.S. census (pop. 7,866) and then under Airport in the 1960 U.S. census (pop. 3,689). It was not listed thereafter until the 2010 U.S. Census.
Alamo	Contra Costa		15,314	14,570	15,626	12,277	8,505	First appeared as an unincorporated place in the 1960 U.S. census (1,791); and then in the 1970 U.S. census under the name Alamo-Danville after being joined with the community of Danville (pop. 14,059) (Danville had a population of 3,585 in the 1960 Census). The two communities were again separated in the 1980 United States census and redesignated as census designated places.
Albion	Mendocino		153	168	x	x	x	
Alderpoint	Humboldt		137	186	x	x	x	
Alhambra Valley	Contra Costa		805	924	x	x	x	
Alleghany	Sierra		30	58	x	x	x	
Allendale	Solano		1,651	1,506	x	x	x	
Allensworth	Tulare		531	471	x	x	x	
Almanor	Plumas		3	0	0	x	x	
Alondra Park	Los Angeles		8,569	8,592	8,622	12,215	12,096	Listed as an unincorporated place in the 1970 U.S. Census (pop. 12,193)
Alpaugh	Tulare		871	1,026	761	x	x	
Alpine	San Diego		14,696	14,236	13,143	9,695	5,368	First appeared as an unincorporated community in the 1960 U.S. census (pop. 1,044); and the 1970 U.S. census (pop. 1,570).
Alpine Village	Alpine		224	114	136	x	x	
Alta	Placer		615	610	x	x	x	
Alta Sierra	Nevada		7,204	6,911	6,522	5,709	2,168	
Alta Sierra	Kern		103	x	x	x	x	
Altadena	Los Angeles		42,846	42,777	42,610	42,658	40,983	Listed as an unincorporated place in the 1960 U.S. Census (pop. 40,568) and in the 1970 U.S. census (pop. 42,415)
Alto	Marin		732	711	x	x	x	
Alum Rock	Santa Clara		12,042	15,536	13,479	x	x	
Amador Pines	Amador		1,118	x	x	x	x	
Amesti	Santa Cruz		2,637	3,478	2,436	x	x	
Anchor Bay	Mendocino		473	340	x	x	x	
Angwin	Napa		2,633	3,051	3,148	3,503	3,256	Listed as an unincorporated place in the 1970 U.S. census (pop. 2,690)
Antelope	Sacramento		48,733	45,770	x	x	x	
Anza	Riverside		3,075	3,014	x	x	x	
Aptos	Santa Cruz		6,664	6,220	9,396	9,061	7,039	Listed as an unincorporated place in the 1970 U.S. census (pop. 8,704)
Aptos Hills-Larkin Valley	Santa Cruz		2,383	2,381	2,361	2,205	x	
Arbuckle	Colusa		3,484	3,028	2,332	1,912	1,306	Listed as an unincorporated place in the 1970 U.S. census (pop. 1,037)
Arden-Arcade	Sacramento		94,569	92,186	96,025	92,040	87,570	Listed as an unincorporated place in the 1960 U.S. census (pop. 73,352) and the 1970 U.S. census (pop. 82,492)
Armona	Kings		4,274	4,156	3,239	4,156	4,274	Listed as an unincorporated place in the 1950 U.S. census (pop. 1,274), 1960 U.S. census (pop. 1,302) and the 1970 U.S. census (pop. 1,392)
Arnold	Calaveras		3,288	3,843	4,218	3,788	2,385	
Aromas	Monterey, San Benito		2,708	2,650	2,797	2,275	x	
Artois	Glenn		295	295	x	x	x	
Ashland	Alameda		23,823	21,925	20,793	16,590	13,893	Listed as an unincorporated place in the 1970 U.S. census (pop. 14,810)
Aspen Springs	Mono		70	65	x	x	x	
Auberry	Fresno		3,238	2,369	2,053	1,866	x	
Auburn Lake Trails	El Dorado		3,388	3,426	x	x	x	
August	San Joaquin		8,628	8,390	7,808	6,376	5,445	Listed as an unincorporated place in the 1970 U.S. census (pop 6,735)
Avery	Calaveras		636	646	672	x	x	
Avila Beach	San Luis Obispo		1,576	1,627	x	x	x	
Avocado Heights	Los Angeles		13,317	15,411	15,148	14,232	11,721	Listed as an unincorporated place in the 1970 U.S. census (pop. 9,810)
Baker	San Bernardino		442	735	x	x	x	
Bakersfield Country Club	Kern		1,715	x	x	x	x	
Ballard	Santa Barbara		768	467	x	x	x	
Ballico	Merced		347	406	x	x	x	
Bangor	Butte		695	646	x	x	x	
Bass Lake	Madera		527	575	x	x	x	
Bay Point	Contra Costa		23,896	21,349	21,534	x	x	
Bayview	Contra Costa		1,782	1,754	x	x	x	
Bayview	Humboldt		2,619	2,510	2,359	1,318	x	
Baywood Park	San Mateo		1,693	x	x	x	x	
Beale AFB	Yuba		1,303	1,319	5,115	6,912	6,329	Listed as an unincorporated community (pop 7,029) under the name the Beale East in the 1970 U.S. census.
Bear Creek	Merced		273	290	x	x	x	
Bear Valley	Alpine		128	121	133	x	x	
Bear Valley	Mariposa		156	125	x	x	x	
Bear Valley Springs	Kern		5,592	5,172	x	x	x	
Beckwourth	Plumas		478	432	342	x	x	
Belden	Plumas		15	22	26	x	x	
Bell Canyon	Ventura		1,946	2,049	x	x	x	
Bella Vista	Shasta		3,641	2,781	x	x	x	
Ben Lomond	Santa Cruz		6,337	6,234	2,364	7,884	7,238	Listed as an unincorporated place in the 1970 U.S. census (pop. 2,793).
Benbow	Humboldt		422	321	x	x	x	
Bend	Tehama		603	619	x	x	x	
Benton	Mono		279	280	x	x	x	
Benton Park	Kern		5,333	x	x	x	x	
Bermuda Dunes	Riverside		8,244	7,282	6,229	4,571	x	
Berry Creek	Butte		1,637	1,424	x	x	x	
Bertsch-Oceanview	Del Norte		2,520	2,436	2,238	x	x	
Bethel Island	Contra Costa		2,131	2,137	2,312	2,115	1,774	First appeared as an unincorporated place in the 1970 U.S. census (pop. 1,398).
Bieber	Lassen		266	312	x	x	x	
Big Bear City	San Bernardino		12,738	12,304	5,779	4,920	11,151	Listed as an unincorporated place in the 1950 U.S. census (pop. 1,434), 1960 U.S. census (pop. 1,562), and the 1970 U.S. census (pop. 5,268)
Big Bend	Shasta		79	102	149	x	x	
Big Creek	Fresno		151	175	x	x	x	
Big Lagoon	Humboldt		161	93	x	x	x	
Big Pine	Inyo		1,875	1,756	1,350	1,158	1,510	
Big River	San Bernardino		1,084	1,327	1,266	705	x	
Biola	Fresno		1,427	1,623	1,037	x	x	
Black Point-Green Point	Marin		1,431	1,306	1,143	x	x	
Blackhawk	Contra Costa		9,637	9,354	10,048	6,199	x	The CDP was renamed Blackhawk-Camino Tassajara in the 2000 U.S. census. The name was changed back to Blackhawk in the 2010 U.S. census.
Blacklake	San Luis Obispo		1,016	930	x	x	x	
Blairsden	Plumas		38	39	50	x	x	
Bloomfield	Sonoma		338	345	x	x	x	
Bloomington	San Bernardino		24,339	23,851	19,318	15,116	12,781	Listed as an unincorporated community in the 1970 U.S. census (pop. 11,957)
Bluewater	San Bernardino		116	172	265	261	x	
Bodega Bay	Sonoma		912	1,077	1,423	1,127	x	
Bodega	Sonoma		211	220	x	x	x	
Bodfish	Kern		2,008	1,956	1,823	1,283	1,379	
Bolinas	Marin		1,483	1,620	1,246	1,098	1,225	
Bombay Beach	Imperial		231	295	366	x	x	
Bonadelle Ranchos	Madera		5,497	x	x	x	x	
Bonita	San Diego		12,917	12,538	12,401	12,542	6,257	
Bonny Doon	Santa Cruz		2,868	2,678	x	x	x	
Bonsall	San Diego		4,546	3,982	3,401	1,881	x	
Boonville	Mendocino		1,018	1,035	x	x	x	
Bootjack	Mariposa							
Boron	Kern		2,086	2,253	2,025	2,101	2,040	Listed as an unincorporated community in the 1970 U.S. census (pop. 1,999)
Boronda	Monterey		1,760	1,710	1,325	x	x	
Borrego Springs	San Diego		1,405	2,244	2,535	2,244	1,405	
Bostonia	San Diego		16,882	15,379	15,169	13,670	x	
Boulder Creek	Santa Cruz		5,429	4,923	4,081	6,725	5,662	Listed as an unincorporated place in the 1950 U.S. census (pop. 1,497), 1960 U.S. census (pop. 1,306), and the 1970 U.S. census (pop. 1,806)
Boulevard	San Diego		359	315	x	x	x	
Bowles	Fresno		158	166	182	x	x	
Boyes Hot Springs	Sonoma		6,215	6,656	6,665	5,973	4,177	Listed as an unincorporated place in the 1950 U.S. census (pop. 2,391), 1960 U.S. census (pop. 2,462), and the 1970 U.S. census (pop. 3,558)
Bradley	Monterey		69	93	120	x	x	
Bret Harte	Stanislaus		5,135	1,152	5,161	x	x	
Bridgeport	Mono		553	575	x	x	x	
Broadmoor	San Mateo							
Brookdale	Santa Cruz		2,043	1,991	x	x	x	
Brooks	Yolo		31	x	x	x	x	
Brooktrails	Mendocino		3,632	3,235	x	x	x	
Buck Meadows	Mariposa		21	31	x	x	x	
Buckhorn	Amador		2,597	2,429	x	x	x	
Bucks Lake	Plumas		22	10	17	x	x	
Buena Vista	Amador		542	429	x	x	x	
Burbank	Santa Clara							
Burney	Shasta							
Burnt Ranch	Trinity		250	281	x	x	x	
Butte Creek Canyon	Butte		780	1,086	x	x	x	
Butte Meadows	Butte		74	40	x	x	x	
Butte Valley	Butte		945	899	x	x	x	
Buttonwillow	Kern		1,337	1,508	1,266	1,301	1,350	Listed as an unincorporated community in the 1970 U.S. census (pop. 1,193)
Byron	Contra Costa		1,140	1,277	916	x	x	
Bystrom	Stanislaus		4,518	4,008	4,148	x	x	
C-Road	Plumas		140	150	152	x	x	
Cabazon	Riverside		2,629	2,535	2,229	1,588	x	
California Hot Springs	Tulare		50	37	x	x	x	
California Pines	Modoc		473	520	x	x	x	
California Polytechnic State University	San Luis Obispo		8,583	x	x	x	x	
Callender	San Luis Obispo		1,282	1,262	x	x	x	
Calpella	Mendocino		799	679	x	x	x	
Calpine	Sierra		223	205	x	x	x	
Calwa	Fresno		1,776	2,052	x	x	x	
Camanche North Shore	Amador		1,070	979	x	x	x	
Camanche Village	Amador		964	847	x	x	x	
Cambria	San Luis Obispo							
Cambrian Park	Santa Clara							
Cameron Park	El Dorado		18,881	18,228	14,549	11,897	5,607	
Camino	El Dorado		1,871	1,750	x	x	x	
Camino Tassajara	Contra Costa		4,951	2,197	x	x	x	
Camp Nelson	Tulare		106	97	x	x	x	
Camp Pendleton Mainside	San Diego		9,683	5,200	8,197	10,373	2,065	The name of the CDP was Camp Pendleton North prior to 2020. Listed as an unincorporated community in the 1970 U.S. census (pop. 11,803)
Camp Pendleton South	San Diego		12,468	10,616	8,854	11,299	7,952	Listed as an unincorporated community in the 1970 U.S. census (pop. 13,692)
Campo	San Diego		2,955	2,684	x	x	x	
Campo Seco	Calaveras		x	x	x	x	x	New CDP in 2023
Camptonville	Yuba		158	158	x	x	x	
Canby	Modoc		183	315	x	x	x	
Cantua Creek	Fresno		500	466	655	x	x	
Canyondam	Plumas		30	31	37	x	x	
Caribou	Plumas		1	0	0	x	x	
Carmel Valley Village	Monterey							
Carmet	Sonoma		55	47	x	x	x	
Carmichael	Sacramento		79,793	61,762	49,742	48,702	43,108	Appeared as a Carmichael first appeared as an unincorporated placein the 1950 U.S. census (pop 4,499), the 1960 U.S. census (pop 20,455), and the 1970 U.S. census (37,625)
Carnelian Bay	Placer		518	524	x	x	x	
Carrick	Siskiyou		143	131	156	x	x	
Cartago	Inyo		62	92	109	x	x	
Caruthers	Fresno		2,613	2,497	2,103	1,603	1,514	
Casa Conejo	Ventura		3,286	3,249	3,180	3,286	x	
Casa Loma	Kern		1,804	x	x	x	x	
Casa de Oro-Mount Helix	San Diego		19,576	18,762	18,874	30,727	19,651	Listed as an unincorporated place under the name Grossmont-Mt. Helix in the 1970 U.S. census (pop. 7,623).
Casmalia	Santa Barbara		147	138	x	x	x	
Caspar	Mendocino		500	509	x	x	x	
Cassel	Shasta							
Castaic	Los Angeles		18,937	19,015	x	x	x	
Castella	Shasta		214	x	x	x	x	
Castle Hill	Contra Costa		1,271	1,299	x	x	x	Formed from part of Alamo CDP
Castro Valley	Alameda		66,441	61,388	57,292	48,619	44,011	Listed as an unincorporated place in the 1960 U.S. census (pop. 37,120) and the 1970 U.S. census (pop. 44,760)
Castroville	Monterey							
Catheys Valley	Mariposa		829	825	x	x	x	
Cayucos	San Luis Obispo							
Cazadero	Sonoma		298	354	x	x	x	
Cedar Flat	Placer		797	x	x	x	x	
Cedar Ridge	Tuolumne		1,235	1,132	x	x	x	Formed from part of deleted Phoenix Lake-Cedar Ridge CDP and additional area.
Cedar Slope	Tulare		10	0	x	x	x	
Cedarville	Modoc		437	514	x	x	x	
Centerville	Fresno		378	392	x	x	x	
Centerville	Shasta		2,095	x	x	x	x	
Chalfant	Mono		660	651	x	x	x	
Challenge-Brownsville	Yuba		1,161	1,148	1,069	1,096	x	
Channel Islands Beach	Ventura		2,870	3,103	3,142	3,317	x	
Charleston View	Inyo		45	x	x	x	x	
Charter Oak	Los Angeles		9,739	9,310	9,027	8,858	6,840	
Cherokee	Butte		88	69	x	x	x	
Cherokee Strip	Kern		206	227	x	x	x	
Cherry Valley	Riverside		6,509	6,362	5,891	5,945	5,012	Listed as an unincorporated community in the 1970 U.S. census (pop. 3,165)
Cherryland	Alameda		15,808	14,728	13,837	11,088	9,425	Listed as an unincorporated community in the 1970 U.S. census (pop. 9,969)
Chester	Plumas		2,187	2,144	2,316	2,082	1,756	Listed as an unincorporated community in the 1960 U.S. census (pop. 1,553) and the 1970 U.S. census (pop. 1,531)
Chilcoot-Vinton	Plumas		446	454	387	x	x	
China Lake Acres	Kern		1,757	1,876	1,761	x	x	
Chinese Camp	Tuolumne		90	126	146	x	x	
Choctaw Valley	Kern		237	x	x	x	x	
Chualar	Monterey		1,185	1,190	1,444	x	x	
Citrus	Los Angeles		10,243	10,866	10,581	9,481	12,450	
Clarksburg	Yolo		402	418	x	x	x	
Clay	Sacramento		1,252	1,195	x	x	x	
Clear Creek	Lassen		175	169	x	x	x	
Clearlake Oaks	Lake							
Clearlake Riviera	Lake		3,410	3,090	x	x	x	The community changed its name to Kelseyville Rivera in 2021; the census continues to use Clearlake Rivera
Cleone	Mendocino		622	618	x	x	x	
Clio	Plumas		77	66	90	x	x	
Clipper Mills	Butte		160	142	x	x	x	
Clyde	Contra Costa		729	678	694	x	x	
Coarsegold	Madera		4,144	1,840	x	x	x	
Cobb	Lake							
Coffee Creek	Trinity							
Cohasset	Butte		830	847	x	x	x	
Cold Springs	El Dorado		556	446	x	x	x	
Cold Springs	Tuolumne		123	181	x	x	x	
Coleville	Mono		419	495	x	x	x	
College City	Colusa		292	290	x	x	x	
Collierville	San Joaquin		2,094	1,934	x	x	x	First appeared as a census designated place in the 2010 U.S. census, one of ten CDPS (Acampo, Collierville, Dogtown, Mountain House, Peters, Terminous, Thornton, Victor, Waterloo, and Woodbridge) formed out of the deleted North Woodbridge CDP and South Woodbridge CDP.
Coloma	El Dorado		521	529	x	x	x	
Columbia	Tuolumne		2,577	2,297	2,405	1,799	x	
Comptche	Mendocino		167	159	x	x	x	
Concow	Butte		402	710	1,095	1,392	x	
Contra Costa Centre	Contra Costa		5,364	6,808	5,133	x	x	Formed as the Waldon CDP in the 2000 U.S. census.
Copperopolis	Calaveras		3,400	3,671	2,363	x	x	
Coronita	Riverside		2,639	2,608	x	x	x	
Corralitos	Santa Cruz		2,342	2,326	2,431	2,513	x	
Coto de Caza	Orange		14,710	14,866	13,057	x	x	
Cottonwood	Kern		3,971	x	x	x	x	
Cottonwood	Shasta		6,268	3,316	2,960	1,747	1,553	Listed as an unincorporated community in the 1970 U.S. census (pop 1,288)
Coulterville	Mariposa		115	201	x	x	x	
Country Club	San Joaquin		10,777	9,379	9,462	9,325	9,585	
Courtland	Sacramento		326	355	x	x	x	
Covelo	Mendocino							
Cowan	Stanislaus							
Crescent Mills	Plumas		206	196	258	x	x	
Cressey	Merced		366	394	x	x	x	
Crest	San Diego		2,828	2,593	2,716	x	x	
Crestline	San Bernardino		11,650	10,770	10,218	8,594	6,715	Listed as an unincorporated place under the name Crest Forest in the 1970 U.S. census (3,509).
Creston	San Luis Obispo		98	94	x	x	x	
Crockett	Contra Costa		3,242	3,094	3,194	3,228	x	
Cromberg	Plumas		272	261	290	x	x	
Crowley Lake	Mono		980	875	x	x	x	
Crows Landing	Stanislaus							
Cutler	Tulare		4,480	5,000	4,491	4,450	3,149	Listed as an unincorporated place in the 1950 U.S. census (pop. 1,768), 1960 U.S. census (pop. 2,191), and the 1970 U.S. census (pop. 2,503)
Cutten	Humboldt		3,223	3,108	2,933	1,516	2,375	Listed as an unincorporated community in the 1960 U.S. census (pop. 1,572); and the 1970 U.S. census (pop. 2,228)
Cuyama	Santa Barbara		37	57	x	x	x	
Dales	Tehama		28	x	x	x	x	
Daphnedale Park	Modoc		129	184	x	x	x	
Darwin	Inyo		36	43	54	x	x	
Davenport	Santa Cruz		388	408	x	x	x	
Day Valley	Santa Cruz		3,410	3,409	3,587	2,842	x	
Deer Park	Napa							
Del Aire	Los Angeles		10,338	10,001	9,012	8,040	8,487	Listed as an unincorporated place in the 1970 U.S. census (pop 11,930)
Del Dios	San Diego		396	x	x	x	x	
Del Monte Forest	Monterey							
Del Rey	Fresno		1,358	1,639	950	1,150	1,126	
Del Rio	Stanislaus		1,399	1,270	1,168	x	x	
Delft Colony	Tulare		412	454	x	x	x	
Delhi	Merced							
Delleker	Plumas		802	705	674	x	x	
Denair	Stanislaus							
Derby Acres	Kern		301	322	376	x	x	
Descanso	San Diego		1,499	1,423	x	x	x	
Desert Center	Riverside		256	204	x	x	x	
Desert Edge	Riverside		4,180	3,822	x	x	x	
Desert Palms	Riverside		6,686	6,957	x	x	x	
Desert Shores	Imperial		1,128	1,104	792	x	x	
Desert View Highlands	Los Angeles		2,175	2,154	2,337	2,360	2,676	Listed as an unincorporated place in the 1970 U.S. census (pop 2,172)
Di Giorgio	Kern		400	x	x	x	x	
Diablo	Contra Costa		1,255	1,158	988	x	x	
Diablo Grande	Stanislaus							
Diamond Springs	El Dorado		11,345	11,037	4,888	2,872	2,287	
Dillon Beach	Marin		246	283	319	x	x	
Discovery Bay	Contra Costa		15,358	13,352	8,981	5,351	1,326	
Dixon Lane-Meadow Creek	Inyo		2,780	2,645	2,702	2,561	x	
Dobbins	Yuba		1,161	1,148	x	x	x	
Dogtown	San Joaquin		2,516	2,506	x	x	x	First appeared as a census designated place in the 2010 U.S. census, one of ten CDPS (Acampo, Collierville, Dogtown, Mountain House, Peters, Terminous, Thornton, Victor, Waterloo, and Woodbridge) formed out of the deleted North Woodbridge CDP and South Woodbridge CDP.
Dollar Point	Placer							
Dorrington	Calaveras		519	609	727	x	x	
Dos Palos Y	Merced		310	323	x	x	x	
Douglas City	Trinity							
Douglas Flat	Calaveras		x	x	x	x	x	New CDP in 2023
Downieville	Sierra		290	282	x	x	x	
Doyle	Lassen		536	678	x	x	x	
Drytown	Amador		186	167	x	x	x	
Ducor	Tulare		616	612	504	x	x	
Dunnigan	Yolo		1,382	1,416	x	x	x	
Durham	Butte		5,834	5,518	5,220	4,784	x	
Dustin Acres	Kern		677	652	585	x	x	
Dutch Flat	Placer		183	160	x	x	x	
Eagleville	Modoc		45	59	x	x	x	
Earlimart	Tulare		7,679	8,537	6,583	5,881	4,578	Listed as an unincorporated place in the 1950 U.S. census (pop. 2,162), 1960 U.S. census (pop. 2,897), and the 1970 U.S. census (pop. 3,080)
East Bakersfield	Kern		9,749	x	x	x	x	
East Foothills	Santa Clara							
East Hemet	Riverside		19,432	17,418	14,823	17,611	14,712	isted as an unincorporated community in the 1970 U.S. census (pop. 8,598) and the 1960 U.S. census (pop. 1,936)
East Los Angeles	Los Angeles		118,786	126,496	124,283	126,379	110,017	Listed as an unincorporated place in the 1960 U.S. census (pop 104,270) and the 1970 U.S. census (pop. 104,881)
East Nicolaus	Sutter							
East Niles	Kern		28,390	x	x	x	x	
East Oakdale	Stanislaus		3,201	2,762	2,742	x	x	
East Orosi	Tulare		423	495	426	x	x	
East Pasadena	Los Angeles		6,021	6,144	6,045	5,910	x	
East Porterville	Tulare		5,549	7,331	6,730	5,790	5,218	Listed as an unincorporated place in the 1960 U.S. census (pop. 3,538) and the 1970 U.S. census (pop. 4,042)
East Quincy	Plumas		2,463	2,489	2,398	x	x	
East Rancho Dominguez	Los Angeles		15,114	15,135	9,286	7,967	6,435	Listed as an unincorporated place in the 1970 U.S. census (pop 5,853)
East Richmond Heights	Contra Costa		3,460	3,280	3,357	3,266	x	
East San Gabriel	Los Angeles		22,769	14,874	14,512	12,736	x	
East Shore	Plumas		181	156	177	x	x	
East Sonora	Tuolumne		2,431	2,266	2,078	1,675	x	
East Tulare Villa	Tulare		773	778	x	x	x	
East Whittier	Los Angeles		10,394	9,757	9,538	9,367	9,688	Listed as an unincorporated place in the 1970 U.S. census (pop 11,930)
Eastern Goleta Valley	Santa Barbara		28,656	x	x	x	x	
Easton	Fresno		1,972	2,083	1,966	1,877	1,710	Listed as an unincorporated community in the 1970 U.S. census (pop. 1,065)
Edgewood	Siskiyou		72	43	67	x	x	
Edison	Kern		255	x	x	x	x	
Edmundson Acres	Kern		296	279	x	x	x	
Edna	San Luis Obispo		184	193	x	x	x	
Edwards AFB	Kern		2,135	2,063	5,909	7,423	8,554	Listed as an unincorporated community in the 1970 U.S. census (pop. 10,331)
El Adobe	Kern		391	x	x	x	x	
El Centro Naval Air Facility	Imperial		280	x	x	x	x	
El Cerrito	Riverside		5,058	5,100	4,590	4,490	x	
El Dorado Hills	El Dorado		50,547	42,108	18,016	6,395	3,453	
El Granada	San Mateo							
El Macero	Yolo		1,074	x	x	x	x	
El Modena	Orange		x	x	x	x	x	New CDP in 2024
El Monte Mobile Village	Tulare		156	x	x	x	x	
El Nido	Merced		331	330	x	x	x	
El Portal	Mariposa		372	474	x	x	x	
El Rancho	Tulare		96	124	x	x	x	
El Rio	Ventura		7,037	7,198	6,193	6,419	5,674	Listed as an unincorporated place in the 1950 U.S. census (pop. 1,376), 1960 U.S. census (pop. 6,966), and the 1970 U.S. census (pop. 6,173)
El Sobrante	Riverside		14,039	12,723	x	x	x	
El Sobrante	Contra Costa		15,524	12,669	12,260	9,852	10,535	
El Verano	Sonoma		3,867	4,123	3,954	3,498	2,384	Listed as an unincorporated place in the 1960 U.S. census (pop. 1,236) and the 1970 U.S. census (pop. 1,753)
Eldridge	Sonoma		1,312	1,233	1,534	1,144	x	
Elfin Forest	San Diego		600	x	x	x	x	
Elizabeth Lake	Los Angeles		1,651	1,756	x	x	x	
Elk Creek	Glenn		138	163	x	x	x	
Elkhorn	Monterey							
Elmira	Solano		193	188	205	x	x	
Elverta	Sacramento		5,435	5,492	x	x	x	
Emerald Lake Hills	San Mateo							
Empire	Stanislaus		4,202	4,189	3,903	x	x	
Esparto	Yolo		3,572	3,108	1,858	1,487	1,303	Listed as an unincorporated place in the 1970 U.S. census (pop. 1,088)
Eucalyptus Hills	San Diego		5,517	5,313	x	x	x	
Fair Oaks	Sacramento							
Fairbanks Ranch	San Diego		2,244	3,148	3,002	x	x	
Fairfax	Kern		1,879	x	x	x	x	
Fairhaven	Humboldt		165	x	x	x	x	
Fairmead	Madera		1,235	1,447	x	x	x	
Fairview	Alameda		11,341	10,003	9,470	9,045	x	
Fall River Mills	Shasta		616	573	648	x	x	
Fallbrook	San Diego		32,267	30,534	29,100	22,095	14,041	Listed as an unincorporated place in the 1950 U.S. census (pop. 1,735), 1960 U.S. census (pop. 4,814), and the 1970 U.S. census (pop. 6,945)
Farmington	San Joaquin		220	207	262	x	x	
Fellows	Kern		52	106	153	x	x	
Felton	Santa Cruz		4,489	4,057	1,051	5,350	4,664	Listed as an unincorporated place in the 1960 U.S. census (pop. 1,380), and the 1970 U.S. census (pop. 2,062)
Fetters Hot Springs-Agua Caliente	Sonoma		4,233	4,144	2,505	2,024	1,675	
Fiddletown	Amador		279	235	x	x	x	
Fieldbrook	Humboldt		827	859	x	x	x	
Fields Landing	Humboldt		287	276	x	x	x	
Fish Camp	Mariposa		49	59	x	x	x	
Florence-Graham	Los Angeles		61,983	63,387	60,197	57,147	48,662	Listed as an unincorporated place in the 1960 U.S. census (pop. 38,164) and the 1970 U.S. census (pop. 42,895)
Florin	Sacramento							
Floriston	Nevada		80	74	x	x	x	
Flournoy	Tehama		117	101	x	x	x	
Foothill Farms	Sacramento							
Forbestown	Butte		396	320	x	x	x	
Ford City	Kern		4,348	4,278	3,512	3,781	3,392	Listed as an unincorporated place in the 1950 U.S. census (pop. 4,347), 1960 U.S. census (pop. 3,926), and the 1970 U.S. census (pop. 3,503)
Forest Meadows	Calaveras		1,276	1,249	1,197	x	x	
Forest Ranch	Butte		1,304	1,184	x	x	x	
Foresta	Mariposa		29	x	x	x	x	First listed as a CDP in the 2020 U.S. census under the name Crane Creek; the name was changed to the Foresta CDP in 2022.
Foresthill	Placer		1,692	1,483	1,791	1,409	1,304	
Forestville	Sonoma		3,264	3,293	2,370	2,443	x	
Fort Bidwell	Modoc		129	184	x	x	x	
Fort Dick	Del Norte		912	x	x	x	x	
Fort Hunter Liggett	Monterey		250	x	x	x	x	
Fort Irwin	San Bernardino		8,096	8,845	x	x	x	
Fort Washington	Fresno		255	233	x	x	x	
Franklin	Merced		6,919	6,149	x	x	x	
Franklin	Sacramento		167	155	x	x	x	
Frazier Park	Kern		2,592	2,691	2,348	2,201	1,444	First listed as an unincorporated place in the 1970 U.S. census (pop. 1,167)
Freedom	Santa Cruz		3,835	3,070	6,000	8,361	6,416	Listed as an unincorporated place in the 1950 U.S. census (pop. 2,765), 1960 U.S. census (pop. 4,206), and the 1970 U.S. census (pop. 5,563)
Freeport	Sacramento		58	38	x	x	x	
French Camp	San Joaquin		3,770	3,376	4,109	3,018	x	
French Gulch	Shasta		373	346	254	x	x	
French Valley	Riverside		35,280	23,067	x	x	x	
Friant	Fresno		446	509	788	x	x	
Fruitdale	Santa Clara		989	935	895	x	x	
Fruitridge Pocket	Sacramento		6,102	5,800	x	x	x	Formed from part of the deleted Parkway-South Sacramento CDP
Fuller Acres	Kern		917	991	x	x	x	
Fulton	Sonoma		551	541	x	x	x	
Furnace Creek	Inyo		136	24	31	x	x	
Garberville	Humboldt		818	913	x	x	x	
Garden Acres	San Joaquin		11,398	10,648	9,747	8,547	7,361	Listed as an unincorporate place in the 1970 U.S. census (pop 7,870)
Garden Farms	San Luis Obispo		449	386	x	x	x	
Garey	Santa Barbara		72	68	x	x	x	
Garnet	Riverside		7,118	7,543	x	x	x	
Gasquet	Del Norte		657	661	x	x	x	
Gazelle	Siskiyou		95	70	136	x	x	
Georgetown	El Dorado		2,255	2,367	962	x	x	
Gerber	Tehama		1,044	1,066	x	x	x	
Geyserville	Sonoma		861	862	x	x	x	
Glen Ellen	Sonoma		714	784	992	1,191	1,014	
Glencoe	Calaveras		x	x	x	x	x	New CDP in 2023
Glennville	Kern		158	x	x	x	x	
Gold Mountain	Plumas		73	80	x	x	x	
Gold River	Sacramento		7,844	7,912	8,023	x	x	
Golden Hills	Kern		9,578	8,656	7,434	5,423	x	
Good Hope	Riverside		9,468	9,192	x	x	x	
Goodmanville	Kern		121	x	x	x	x	
Goodyears Bar	Sierra		69	68	x	x	x	
Goshen	Tulare		4,968	3,006	2,394	x	x	
Graeagle	Plumas		724	737	831	x	x	
Grangeville	Kings		508	469	x	x	x	
Granite Bay	Placer							
Granite Hills	San Diego		3,267	3,035	3,246	3,197	x	
Graniteville	Nevada		1	11	x	x	x	
Graton	Sonoma		1,683	1,707	1,815	1,409	1,286	
Grayson	Stanislaus		1,041	952	1,077	x	x	
Greeley Hill	Mariposa		927	915	x	x	x	
Green Acres	Riverside		2,918	1,805	x	x	x	
Green Valley	Los Angeles		1,654	1,625	1,859	x	x	
Green Valley	Solano		1,654	1,625	1,859	x	x	
Greenacres	Kern		5,496	5,566	x	7,379	5,381	First appeared as an unincorporated place in the 1970 U.S. census (pop. 2,116); and as a census designated place in the 1980 U.S. census. The CDP was deleted prior to the 2000 U.S. census after being partly annexed to the city of Bakersfield. The remaining area was again designated as census designated place in the 2010 U.S. census.
Greenfield	Kern		3,477	3,991	x	x	x	
Greenhorn	Plumas		247	236	146	x	x	
Greenview	Siskiyou		208	201	200	x	x	
Greenville	Plumas		1,160	1,129	1,026			
Grenada	Siskiyou		314	367	361	x	x	
Grimes	Colusa		296	391	x	x	x	
Grizzly Flats	El Dorado		1,093	1,066	x	x	x	
Groveland	Tuolumne		540	601	x	x	x	Formed from part of deleted Groveland-Big Oak Flat CDP and additional area.
Guerneville	Sonoma		4,552	4,534	2,467	1,966	1,525	
Guinda	Yolo		245	254	x	x	x	
Hacienda Heights	Los Angeles		54,191	54,038	53,122	52,354	49,422	First listed as an unincorporated place in the 1970 U.S. census (pop. 35,969)
Hamilton Branch	Plumas		505	537	587	x	x	
Hamilton City	Glenn		2,263	1,759	1,903	1,811	1,337	
Happy Camp	Siskiyou							
Happy Valley	Shasta		4,949	x	x	x	x	
Harbison Canyon	San Diego		4,048	3,841	3,645	2,122	x	
Hardwick	Kings		151	138	x	x	x	
Hathaway Pines	Calaveras		x	x	x	x	x	New CDP in 2023
Harmony Grove	San Diego		2,079	x	x	x	x	
Hartland	Tulare		69	30	x	x	x	
Hartley	Solano							
Hasley Canyon	Los Angeles		1,195	1,137	x	x	x	
Hat Creek	Shasta							
Hayfork	Trinity							
Heber	Imperial		6,896	4,275	2,988	2,566	2,221	
Herald	Sacramento		1,160	1,184	x	x	x	
Herlong	Lassen		237	298	x	x	x	
Hickman	Stanislaus		604	641	457	x	x	
Hidden Meadows	San Diego		4,484	3,485	3,463	2,371	x	
Hidden Valley Lake	Lake		6,235	5,579	3,777	1,961	x	
Highgrove	Riverside		7,515	3,988	3,445	3,175	x	
Highlands	San Mateo		2,359	x	x	x	x	
Hillcrest	Kern		10,528	x	x	x	x	
Hilmar-Irwin	Merced		5,164	5,197	4,807	3,392	1,706	
Hiouchi	Del Norte		314	301	x	x	x	
Home Garden	Kings		1,653	1,761	1,702	1,549	1,495	Listed as an unincorporated place in the 1970 U.S. census (pop. 2,494).
Home Gardens	Riverside		11,203	11,570	9,461	7,780	5,783	Listed as an unincorporated place in the 1960 U.S. census (pop. 5,116). and the 1970 U.S. census (pop. 1,541).
Homeland	Riverside		6,772	5,969	3,710	3,312	2,616	First listed as a CDP in the 1970 U.S. census (pop. 1,187)
Homestead Valley	San Bernardino		2,789	3,032	x	x	x	
Homewood Canyon	Inyo		40	44	x	x	x	Split from the Homewood Canyon-Valley Wells CDP prior to the 2010 U.S. census
Honcut	Butte		306	370	x	x	x	
Hood	Sacramento		244	271	x	x	x	
Hoopa	Humboldt		3,167	x	x	x	x	
Hopland	Mendocino		661	756	x	x	x	
Hornbrook	Siskiyou		266	248	286	x	x	
Hornitos	Mariposa		38	75	x	x	x	
Humboldt Hill	Humboldt		3,498	3,414	3,246	2,865	x	
Hyampom	Trinity		241	241	x	x	x	
Hydesville	Humboldt		1,244	1,237	1,209	1,131	x	
Hypericum	Tulare		125	x	x	x	x	
Idlewild	Tulare		32	43	x	x	x	
Idyllwild-Pine Cove	Riverside		4,163	3,874	3,504	2,853	2,959	
Igo	Shasta		103	x	x	x	x	
Independence	Inyo		593	669	574	x	x	
Indian Falls	Plumas		37	54	79	x	x	
Indianola	Humboldt		791	823	x	x	x	
Indio Hills	Riverside		1,048	972	x	x	x	
Interlaken	Santa Cruz		7,368	7,321	7,328	6,404	x	
Inverness	Marin		1,379	1,304	1,421	1,442	x	
Inyokern	Kern		988	1,099	984	x	x	
Iron Horse	Plumas		269	297	321	x	x	
Isla Vista	Santa Barbara		15,500	23,096	18,344	20,395	13,441	
Ivanhoe	Tulare		4,468	4,495	4,474	3,293	2,684	First appeared as an unincorporated place in the 1950 U.S. census (pop. 1,172); the 1960 U.S. census (pop. 1,616); and the 1970 U.S. census (pop. 1,595).
Jacumba	San Diego		540	561	x	x	x	
Jamestown	Tuolumne		3,478	3,433	3,017	2,178	2,206	
Jamul	San Diego		6,179	6,163	5,920	2,258	1,826	
Janesville	Lassen		2,461	1,408	x	x	x	
Jenner	Sonoma		122	136	x	x	x	
Johannesburg	Kern		113	172	176	x	x	
Johnson Park	Shasta		686	x	x	x	x	
Johnstonville	Lassen		973	1,024	x	x	x	
Johnsville	Plumas		22	20	21	x	x	
Jones Valley	Shasta		1,160	x	x	x	x	
Joshua Tree	San Bernardino		6,489	7,414	4,207	3,898	2,083	Listed as an unincorporated place in the 1970 U.S. Census (pop. 1,211)
Jovista	Tulare		41	x	x	x	x	
Julian	San Diego		1,318	1,502	1,621	1,284	1,320	
Junction City	Trinity							
June Lake	Mono		611	629	x	x	x	
Keedie	Plumas		51	66	96	x	x	
Keeler	Inyo		71	66	66	x	x	
Keene	Kern		469	431	339	x	x	
Kelly Ridge	Butte		3,006	2,544	x	x	x	Formed from part of Oroville East CDP
Kelseyville	Lake		1,567	2,861	2,928	3,353	3,382	
Kennedy	San Joaquin		3,223	3,254	3,275	x	x	
Kennedy Meadows	Tulare		58	28	x	x	x	
Kensington	Contra Costa		5,428	5,077	4,936	4,974	5,342	First listed as an unincorporated place in the 1970 U.S. census (pop. 5,823)
Kentfield	Marin		6,808	6,485	6,351	6,030	x	
Kenwood	Sonoma		852	1,028	x	x	x	
Kep'el	Humboldt		76	x	x	x	x	
Kernville	Kern		1,549	1,395	1,736	1,656	1,660	
Keswick	Shasta							
Kettleman City	Kings		1,242	1,439	1,499	1,411	1,051	
Keyes	Stanislaus		5,672	5,601	4,575	2,878	x	
Kings Beach	Placer							
Kingvale	Nevada, Placer		128	143	x	x	x	
Kirkwood	Alpine, Amador		96	158	190	x	x	
Klamath	Del Norte		1,088	779	651	827	x	
Knights Ferry	Stanislaus		112	x	x	x	x	
Knights Landing	Yolo		1,117	995	x	x	x	
Knightsen	Contra Costa		1,596	1,568	861	x	x	
La Crescenta-Montrose	Los Angeles		19,997	19,653	18,532	16,968	16,531	First listed as an unincorporated place in the 1970 U.S. census (pop. 19,594)
La Cresta	Kern		8,787	x	x	x	x	
La Grange	Stanislaus		166	x	x	x	x	
La Honda	San Mateo		979	928	x	x	x	
La Porte	Plumas		65	26	73	x	x	
La Presa	San Diego		35,033	34,169	32,721	x	x	
La Riviera	Sacramento							
La Selva Beach	Santa Cruz		2,531	2,743	x	x	x	
La Vina	Madera		637	279	x	x	x	
Ladera	San Mateo							
Ladera Heights	Los Angeles		6,654	6,498	6,568	6,316	6,647	First listed as an unincorporated place in the 1970 U.S. Census (pop. 6,079)
Ladera Ranch	Orange		26,170	22,980	x	x	x	
Lagunitas-Forest Knolls	Marin		1,924	1,819	1,835	1,821	1,465	
Lake Almanor Country Club	Plumas		847	419	451	x	x	
Lake Almanor Peninsula	Plumas		366	356	336	x	x	
Lake Almanor West	Plumas		211	270	329	x	x	
Lake Arrowhead	San Bernardino		12,401	12,424	8,934	6,539	6,272	Listed as an unincorporated place in the 1970 U.S. Census (pop. 2,682)
Lake California	Tehama		3,377	3,054	x	x	x	
Lake City	Modoc		71	61	x	x	x	
Lake Davis	Plumas		23	45	72	x	x	
Lake Don Pedro	Mariposa		1,765	1,077	x	x	x	
Lake Hughes	Los Angeles		544	649	x	x	x	
Lake Isabella	Kern		3,573	3,466	3,315	3,323	3,428	
Lake Los Angeles	Los Angeles		13,187	12,328	11,523	7,977	x	
Lake Mathews	Riverside		5,972	5,980	x	x	x	
Lake Nacimiento	San Luis Obispo		2,956	2,411	2,176	1,556	x	
Lake Riverside	Riverside		1,375	1,173	x	x	x	
Lake San Marcos	San Diego		5,328	4,437	4,138	3,802	x	
Lake Shastina	Siskiyou		2,401	x	x	x	x	
Lake Sherwood	Ventura		1759	1,527	x	x	x	
Lake Wildwood	Nevada		5,158	4,991	4,868	x	x	
Lake of the Pines	Nevada		4,301	3,917	3,956	3,890	x	
Lake of the Woods	Kern		790	917	833	x	x	
Lakehead	Shasta		469	461	549	x	x	Listed under the name Lakehead-Lakeshore in the 2000 U.S. census
Lakeland Village	Riverside		12,364	11,541	5,626	5,159	2,796	Listed as an unincorporated place in the 1960 U.S. census (pop. 3,359), and the 1970 U.S. census (pop. 1,724)
Lakeside	Kern		843	x	x	x	x	
Lakeside	San Diego		21,152	20,648	19,560	19,412	23,921	Listed as an unincorporated place in the 1970 U.S. Census (pop. 11,991)
Lakeview	Riverside		1,977	2,104	1,619	1,448	x	
Lamont	Kern		14,049	15,120	13,296	11,517	9,616	Listed as an unincorporated place in the 1950 U.S. census (pop. 3,571), 1960 U.S. census (pop. 6,177), and the 1970 U.S. census (pop. 7,007)
Lanare	Fresno		540	589	540	x	x	
Larkfield-Wikiup	Sonoma		8,492	8,884	7,479	6,779	x	
Las Flores	Orange		5,995	5,971	5,625	x	x	
Las Flores	Tehama		1,044	1,066	x	x	x	
Las Lomas	Monterey		3,046	3,024	3,078	2,127	1,740	
Laton	Fresno		1,622	1,824	1,236	1,415	1,100	Listed as an unincorporated community in the 1960 U.S. census (pop. 1,052); and the 1970 U.S. census (pop. 1,071)
Laytonville	Mendocino							
Le Grand	Merced		1,592	1,659	1,760	1,205	x	
Lebec	Kern		1,239	1,468	1,224	x	x	
Lee Vining	Mono		217	222	x	x	x	
Leggett	Mendocino		77	122	x	x	x	
Lemon Cove	Tulare		298	308	298	x	x	
Lemon Hill	Sacramento		14,496	13,729	x	x	x	Formed from part of the deleted Parkway-South Sacramento CDP.
Lemoore Station	Kings		6,568	7,438	5,749	x	5,888	Listed as an unincorporated place in the 1970 U.S. census (pop. 8,512) No census was conducted in 1990 although it remained a CDP.
Lennox	Los Angeles		20,323	22,753	22,950	22,757	18,445	Listed as an unincorporated place in the 1960 U.S. census (pop. 31,224) and the 1970 U.S. census (pop. 16,121)
Lenwood	San Bernardino		3,623	3,543	3,222	3,190	2,974	Listed as an unincorporated place in the 1960 U.S. census (pop. 3,834) and the 1970 U.S. census (pop. 2,407)
Leona Valley	Los Angeles		1,555	1,607	x	x	x	
Lewiston	Trinity							
Lexington Hills	Santa Clara							
Likely	Modoc		58	63	x	x	x	
Lincoln Village	San Joaquin		4,401	4,381	4,216	4,236	6,476	List as an unincoporated place in the 1970 U.S. census (pop 6,722)
Linda	Yuba		21,654	17,773	13,474	13,033	10,225	First appeared as an unincorporated place in the 1960 U.S. census (6,129); and then in the 1970 U.S. census (pop. 7,731)
Lindcove	Tulare		189	406	x	x	x	
Linden	San Joaquin		1,863	1,784	1,103	1,339	x	
Linnell Camp	Tulare		696	949	x	x	x	
Litchfield	Lassen		160	195	x	x	x	
Little Grass Valley	Plumas		25	2	0	x	x	
Little River	Mendocino		94	117	x	x	x	
Little Valley	Lassen							
Littlerock	Los Angeles		1,535	1,377	1,402	1,320	x	
Live Oak	Santa Cruz		17,038	17,158	16,628	15,212	11,482	Listed as an unincorporated place in the 1960 U.S. census (pop. 3,518), and the 1970 U.S. census (pop. 6,443)
Lockeford	San Joaquin		3,333	3,233	3,179	2,722	1,852	
Lockwood	Amador		495	x	x	x	x	
Lockwood	Monterey		368	379	x	x	x	
Lodoga	Colusa		184	197	x	x	x	
Loleta	Humboldt		828	783	x	x	x	
Loma Mar	San Mateo		134	113	x	x	x	
Loma Rica	Yuba		2,409	2,368	2,075	1,852	x	
Lompico	Santa Cruz		1,154	1,137	x	x	x	
London	Tulare		1,518	1,869	1,848	1,638	1,257	
Lone Pine	Inyo		2,014	2,035	1,655	1,818	1,684	Listed as an unincorporated place in the 1950 U.S. census (pop. 1,415), 1960 U.S. census (pop. 1,310); and in the 1970 U.S. census (pop. 1,241)
Long Barn	Tuolumne		162	155	x	x	x	
Lookout	Modoc		68	84	x	x	x	
Los Alamos	Santa Barbara		1,839	1,890	1,372	x	x	
Los Berros	San Luis Obispo		623	641	x	x	x	
Los Molinos	Tehama		2,098	2,037	1,952	1,709	1,241	
Los Olivos	Santa Barbara		1,202	1,132	x	x	x	
Los Osos	San Luis Obispo							
Los Ranchos	San Luis Obispo							
Lost Hills	Kern		2,370	2,412	1,938	1,212	x	
Lower Lake	Lake							
Loyola	Santa Clara							
Lucas Valley-Marinwood	Marin		6,259	6,094	6,357	5,982	6,409	
Lucerne	Lake							
Lucerne Valley	San Bernardino		5,331	5,811	x	x	x	
Lytle Creek	San Bernardino		725	701	x	x	x	
Mabie	Plumas		181	161	x	x	x	
Macdoel	Siskiyou		86	133	140	x	x	
Mad River	Trinity							
Madeline	Lassen		21	x	x	x	x	
Madera Acres	Madera							
Madera Ranchos	Madera		3,623	x	x	x	x	
Madison	Yolo		581	503	x	x	x	
Magalia	Butte		7,795	11,310	10,569	8,987	x	
Malaga	Fresno		884	947	762	x	x	Incorrectly named Calwa CDP when formed in the 2000 U.S. census; renamed Malaga for the 2010 U.S. Census
Manchester	Mendocino		159	195	x	x	x	
Manila	Humboldt		828	783	x	x	x	
Manton	Tehama		276	347	372	x	x	
March ARB	Riverside		809	1,159	370	5,523	3,607	First appeared as an unincorporated place in the 1970 U.S. census (pop. 2,002);
Marin City	Marin		2,993	2,666	x	x	x	
Marina del Rey	Los Angeles		11,373	8,866	8,176	7,431	8,065	
Mariposa	Mariposa							
Markleeville	Alpine		191	210	197	x	x	
Martell	Amador		282	207	x	x	x	
Matheny	Tulare		1,125	1,212	x	x	x	
Mather	Sacramento		4,698	4,451	x	x	x	Formed from part of deleted Rancho Cordova CDP and additional area
Maxwell	Colusa		1,067	1,103	x	x	x	
Mayfair	Fresno		4,831	4,589	x	x	x	
Mayflower Village	Los Angeles		5,402	5,515	5,081	4,978	5,017	
McArthur	Shasta		334	338	365	x	x	
McClellan Park	Sacramento		926	743	x	x	x	Formed from part of the North Highlands CDP and additional area
McClenney Tract	Tulare		15	10	x	x	x	
McCloud	Siskiyou							
McGee Creek	Mono		45	41	x	x	x	
McKinleyville	Humboldt		16,262	15,177	13,599	10,749	7,772	
McKittrick	Kern		102	115	160	x	x	
McSwain	Merced		4,480	3,704	x	x	x	
Mead Valley	Riverside		19,819	18,510	x	x	x	
Meadow Valley	Plumas		453	464	575	x	x	
Meadow Vista	Placer							
Meadowbrook	Riverside		3,142	3,185	x	x	x	
Mecca	Riverside		8,219	8,577	5,402	1,966	1,698	
Meiners Oaks	Ventura		3,911	3,571	3,750	3,329	9,512	Listed as an unincorporated place in the 1950 U.S. census (pop. 2,446), 1960 U.S. census (pop. 3,513); and under the name Meiners Oaks-Mira Monte in the 1970 U.S. census (pop. 7,025) The name was changed back to Meiners Oaks for the 1980 U.S. census.
Mendocino	Mendocino		932	894	824	x	x	
Mentone	San Bernardino		9,557	8,720	7,803	5,675	x	
Meridian	Sutter							
Mesa	Inyo		275	251	214	x	x	
Mesa Verde	Riverside		766	1,023	x	x	x	
Mesa Vista	Alpine		217	200	182	x	x	
Mettler	Kern		90	136	157	x	x	
Mexican Colony	Kern		283	281	x	x	x	
Meyers	El Dorado		2,163	x	x	x	x	
Mi-Wuk Village	Tuolumne		935	941	1,485	1,175	x	
Middletown	Lake		1,114	1,323	1,020	x	x	
Midpines	Mariposa		379	1,204	x	x	x	
Midway City	Orange		8,825	8,485	x	x	x	
Milford	Lassen		147	167	x	x	x	
Millerton	Fresno		686	x	x	x	x	
Millville	Shasta		724	727	610	x	x	
Mineral	Tehama		136	123	143	x	x	
Minkler	Fresno		867	1,003	x	x	x	
Mira Monte	Ventura		6,618	6,854	7,177	7,744	x	First appeared as a census designated place prior to the 1990 U.S. census after being separated from the Meiners Oaks CDP.
Miranda	Humboldt		441	520	x	x	x	
Mission Canyon	Santa Barbara		2,540	2,381	2,610	x	x	
Mission Hills	Santa Barbara		3,571	3,576	3,142	3,112	2,797	Listed as an unincorporated place in the 1970 U.S. census (pop. 2,699)
Modjeska	Orange		632	x	x	x	x	
Mohawk Vista	Plumas		107	159	121	x	x	
Mojave	Kern		4,699	4,238	3,836	3,763	2,886	Listed as an unincorporated place in the 1950 U.S. census (pop. 2,055), 1960 U.S. census (pop. 1,845), and the 1970 U.S. census (pop. 2,573)
Mokelumne Hill	Calaveras		691	646	774	x	x	
Monmouth	Fresno		120	152	x	x	x	
Mono City	Mono		184	172	x	x	x	
Mono Vista	Tuolumne		3,236	3,127	3,072	2,599	1,154	
Monson	Tulare		152	188	x	x	x	
Montalvin Manor	Contra Costa		3,099	2,876	x	x	x	Formed in 2010 from part of split Bayview-Montalvin CDP and part of Tara Hills CDP
Montara	San Mateo							
Monte Rio	Sonoma		1,080	1,152	1,104	1,058	1,137	
Montecito	Santa Barbara		8,638	8,965	10,000	x	x	
Monterey Park Tract	Stanislaus							
Montgomery Creek	Shasta		176	163	96	x	x	
Monument Hills	Yolo		1,702	1,542	x	x	x	
Morada	San Joaquin							
Morongo Valley	San Bernardino		3,514	3,552	1,929	1,544	1,137	
Moskowite Corner	Napa		237	210	x	x	x	
Moss Beach	San Mateo							
Moss Landing	Monterey		237	204	300	x	x	
Mount Hebron	Siskiyou		103	95	92	x	x	
Mount Hermon	Santa Cruz		1,110	1,037	x	x	x	
Mount Laguna	San Diego		74	57	x	x	x	
Mountain Center	Riverside		66	63	x	x	x	
Mountain Gate	Shasta							
Mountain House	San Joaquin		24,499	9,675	x	x	x	First appeared as a census designated place in the 2010 U.S. census, one of ten CDPS (Acampo, Collierville, Dogtown, Mountain House, Peters, Terminous, Thornton, Victor, Waterloo, and Woodbridge) formed out of the deleted North Woodbridge CDP and South Woodbridge CDP. Incorporated as a city in 2024.
Mountain Meadows	Kern		303	x	x	x	x	
Mountain Mesa	Kern		823	777	716	1,153	x	
Mountain Ranch	Calaveras		223	1,628	1,557	x	x	
Mountain View Acres	San Bernardino		3,337	3,130	2,521	2,469	1,686	
Mountain View	Contra Costa		2,622	2,372	2,468	x	x	
Mt. Bullion	Mariposa		154	x	x	x	x	
Muir Beach	Marin		304	310	295	x	x	
Murphys	Calaveras		1,995	2,213	2,061	x	x	
Muscoy	San Bernardino		10,719	10,644	8,919	7,541	6,188	Listed as an unincorporated place in the 1970 U.S. Census (pop. 7,091)
Myers Flat	Humboldt		90	146	x	x	x	
Myrtletown	Humboldt		4,882	4,675	4,459	4,413	3,959	Listed as an unincorporated community in the 1950 U.S. census (pop. 1,727); the 1960 U.S. census (pop. 3,634); and the 1970 U.S. census (pop. 3,922)
New Cuyama	Santa Barbara		542	517	x	x	x	
New Pine Creek	Modoc		87	98	x	x	x	
Newcastle	Placer		1,321	1,224	x	x	x	
Newell	Modoc		301	449	x	x	x	
Nicasio	Marin		81	96	x	x	x	
Nice	Lake							
Nicolaus	Sutter							
Niland	Imperial		756	1,006	1,143	1,183	x	
Nipinnawasee	Madera		615	475	x	x	x	
Nipomo	San Luis Obispo							
Nord	Butte		286	320	x	x	x	
Norris Canyon	Contra Costa		1,313	957	x	x	x	
North Auburn	Placer							
North Edwards	Kern		1,054	1,058	1,227	1,259	1,107	
North El Monte	Los Angeles		3,730	3,723	3,703	3,384	x	
North Fair Oaks	San Mateo							
North Fork	Madera		3,250	x	x	x	x	
North Gate	Contra Costa		667	679	x	x	x	Formed from part of Alamo CDP and additional area
North Highlands	Sacramento		49,327	42,694	44,187	42,105	37,825	Listed as an unincorporated place in the 1960 U.S. Census (pop. 21,271) and in the 1970 U.S. census (pop. 31,854)
North Lakeport	Lake		3,547	3,314	2,879	x	x	
North Richmond	Contra Costa		4,175	3,717	x	x	x	
North San Juan	Nevada							
North Shore	Riverside		3,585	3,477	x	x	x	
North Tustin	Orange		25,718	24,917	24,044	24,358	26,174	First listed as an unincorporated place in the 1970 U.S. census (pop 26,598)
Nubieber	Lassen		50	19	x	x	x	
Nuevo	Riverside		6,733	6,447	4,135	3,010	1,628	
Oak Glen	San Bernardino		602	638	x	x	x	
Oak Hills	San Bernardino		9,450	8,879	x	x	x	
Oak Park	Ventura		13,898	14,266	2,320	2,412	x	
Oak Run	Shasta		158	x	x	x	x	
Oak Shores	San Luis Obispo							
Oak View	Ventura		6,215	4,066	4,199	3,606	4,671	First appeared as an unincoporated place under the name Oakview in the 1950 U.S. census (1,648); and then as Oak View the 1960 U.S. census (2,448) and the 1970 U.S. census (pop. 4,872)
Oakhurst	Madera							
Oakville	Napa		49	71	x	x	x	
Oasis	Riverside		4,468	6,890	x	x	x	
Occidental	Sonoma		1,132	1,115	1,272	1,300	x	
Oceano	San Luis Obispo							
Ocotillo	Imperial		215	266	296	x	x	
Oildale	Kern		36,135	32,684	27,885	26,553	23,382	Listed as an unincorporated place in the 1970 U.S. census (pop. 20,879)
Olancha	Inyo		131	192	134	x	x	
Old Fig Garden	Fresno		5,477	5,365	x	x	x	
Old River	Kern		123	x	x	x	x	
Old Station	Shasta							
Old Stine	Kern		3,841	x	x	x	x	
Olde Stockdale	Kern		568	x	x	x	x	
Olivehurst	Yuba		16,595	13,656	11,061	9,738	8,929	Listed as an unincorporated place in the 1950 U.S. census (pop. 3,588), 1960 U.S. census (pop. 4,835), and the 1970 U.S. census (pop. 8,100)
Ono	Shasta		93	x	x	x	x	
Onyx	Kern		457	475	476	x	x	
Orange Blossom	Stanislaus		1,068	x	x	x	x	
Orange Park Acres	Orange		x	x	x	x	x	New CDP in 2024
Orangevale	Sacramento							
Orcutt	Santa Barbara		32,034	28,905	28,830	x	x	
Orick	Humboldt		328	357	x	x	x	
Orosi	Tulare		13,898	14,266	2,320	2,412	4,076	First appeared as an unincorporated place in the 1960 U.S. census (pop. 1,048) and the 1970 U.S. census (pop. 2,757).
Oroville East	Butte		8,038	8,280	8,680	8,462	x	
Pacheco	Contra Costa		4,183	3,685	3,562	3,325	x	
Pajaro	Monterey							
Pajaro Dunes	Santa Cruz		122	144	x	x	x	
Pala	San Diego		1,490	x	x	x	x	
Palermo	Butte		5,555	5,382	5,720	5,260	2,572	First appeared as an unincorporated place in the 1970 U.S. census (pop. 1,966).
Palo Cedro	Shasta		2,931	1,269	1,247	x	x	
Palo Verde	Imperial		152	171	236	x	x	
Paloma	Calaveras		x	x	x	x	x	New CDP in 2023
Panorama Heights	Tulare		44	41	x	x	x	
Paradise	Mono		174	153	x	x	x	
Paradise Park	Santa Cruz		367	389	x	x	x	
Parklawn	Stanislaus							
Parksdale	Madera							
Parkway	Sacramento		15,962	14,670	x	x	x	Formed from part of the deleted Parkway-South Sacramento CDP and from area detached from Sacramento city.
Parkwood	Madera							
Pasatiempo	Santa Cruz		1,093	1,041	x	x	x	
Paskenta	Tehama		110	114	x	x	x	
Patterson Tract	Tulare		1,888	1,752	x	x	x	
Patton Village	Lassen		632	702	x	x	x	
Paxton	Plumas		0	14	21	x	x	
Paynes Creek	Tehama		54	57	x	x	x	
Pearsonville	Inyo		8	17	27	x	x	
Penn Valley	Nevada							
Penngrove	Sonoma		2,637	2,522	x	x	x	
Penryn	Placer		1,150	831	x	x	x	
Pepperdine University	Los Angeles		2,747	x	x	x	x	
Pescadero	San Mateo							
Petaluma Center	Sonoma		709	x	x	x	x	
Peters	San Joaquin		706	672	x	x	x	First appeared as a census designated place in the 2010 U.S. census, one of ten CDPS (Acampo, Collierville, Dogtown, Mountain House, Peters, Terminous, Thornton, Victor, Waterloo, and Woodbridge) formed out of the deleted North Woodbridge CDP and South Woodbridge CDP.
Phelan	San Bernardino		14,304	13,859	x	x	x	
Phillipsville	Humboldt		124	140	x	x	x	
Philo	Mendocino		319	349	x	x	x	
Phoenix Lake	Tuolumne		4,264	4,269	x	x	x	Formed from part of the deleted Phoenix Lake-Cedar Ridge CDP and part of Mono Vista CDP.
Pierpoint	Tulare		59	52	x	x	x	
Pike	Sierra		159	134	x	x	x	
Pine Canyon	Monterey		1,871	1,822	x	x	x	
Pine Flat	Tulare		206	166	x	x	x	
Pine Grove	Amador		2,891	2,219	x	x	x	
Pine Hills	Humboldt		3,186	3,131	3,108	2,947	2,686	
Pine Mountain Club	Kern		2,422	2,315	1,600	x	x	
Pine Mountain Lake	Tuolumne		2,636	2,796	x	x	x	Formed from part of the deleted Groveland-Big Oak Flat CDP and additional area.
Pine Valley	San Diego		1,645	1,510	1,501	1,297	x	
Pioneer	Amador		1,066	1,094	x	x	x	
Piru	Ventura		2,587	2,063	1,196	1,157	1,284	
Pixley	Tulare		3,828	3,310	2,586	2,457	2,488	First appeared as an unincorporated place in the 1960 U.S. census (pop. 1,327); and the 1970 U.S. census (pop. 1,584).
Piñon Hills	San Bernardino		7,258	7,272	x	x	x	
Plainview	Tulare		945	846	x	x	x	
Planada	Merced							
Platina	Shasta		13	x	x	x	x	
Pleasure Point	Santa Cruz		5,821	5,846	6,458	5,940	5,401	Listed as an unincorporated place under the name Opal Cliffs in the 1960 U.S. census (pop. 3,825), and the 1970 U.S. census (pop. 5,425) name change to Pleasure Point for the 2010 U.S. census
Plumas Eureka	Plumas		334	339	320	x	x	
Plumas Lake	Yuba		8,126	5,853	x	x	x	
Point Reyes Station	Marin		895	848	818	x	x	
Pollock Pines	El Dorado		7,112	6,871	4,728	4,291	1,941	
Ponderosa	Tulare		51	16	x	x	x	
Poplar-Cotton Center	Tulare		2,370	2,470	1,496	1,901	1,295	First appeared as an unincorporated place under the name Poplar in the 1960 U.S. census (pop. 1,478); and the 1970 U.S. census (pop. 1,239). The name was changed to Poplar-Cotton Center for the 1980 U.S. census.
Port Costa	Contra Costa		190	190	232	x	x	
Posey	Tulare		23	10	x	x	x	
Poso Park	Tulare		9	9	x	x	x	
Post Mountain	Trinity		3,032	x	x	x	x	
Potomac Park	Kern		9,164	x	x	x	x	
Potrero	San Diego		648	656	x	x	x	
Potter Valley	Mendocino		665	646	x	x	x	
Prattville	Plumas		24	33	28	x	x	
Princeton	Colusa		309	303	x	x	x	
Proberta	Tehama		267	237	x	x	x	
Prunedale	Monterey							
Pumpkin Center	Kern		421	x	x	x	x	
Quartz Hill	Los Angeles		11,447	10,912	9,890	9,626	7,421	Listed as an unincorporated place in the 1960 U.S. census (pop. 3,325) and the 1970 U.S. Census (pop. 4,935)
Quincy	Plumas		1,630	1,728	1,879	x	x	
Rackerby	Butte, Yuba		210	204	x	x	x	
Rail Road Flat	Calaveras		316	475	549	x	x	
Rainbow	San Diego		1,884	1,832	2,026	2,006	1,092	
Raisin City	Fresno		303	380	165	x	x	
Ramona	San Diego		21,468	20,292	15,691	13,040	8,173	Listed as an unincorporated place in the 1950 U.S. census (pop. 1,158), 1960 U.S. census (pop. 2,449), and the 1970 U.S. census (pop. 3,554)
Rancho Calaveras	Calaveras		5,590	5,325	4,182	x	x	
Rancho Mission Viejo	Orange		10,378	x	x	x	x	
Rancho Murieta	Sacramento							
Rancho San Diego	San Diego		21,858	21,208	20,155	6,977	x	
Rancho Santa Fe	San Diego		3,156	3,117	3,252	x	x	
Rancho Tehama Reserve	Tehama		1,572	1,485	1,406	x	x	
Randsburg	Kern		45	69	77	x	x	
Red Corral	Amador		1,687	1,413	x	x	x	
Redcrest	Humboldt		61	89	x	x	x	
Redway	Humboldt		1,247	1,225	1,188	1,212	1,094	
Redwood Valley	Mendocino		1,843	1,729	x	x	x	
Reliez Valley	Contra Costa		3,354	3,101	x	x	x	
Rexland Acres	Kern		3,563	x	x	x	x	
Richfield	Tehama		309	306	x	x	x	
Richgrove	Tulare		2,358	2,882	2,723	1,899	1,398	First appeared as an unincorporated place the 1970 U.S. census (pop. 1,023).
Richvale	Butte		234	244	x	x	x	
Ridgecrest Heights	Kern		380	x	x	x	x	
Ridgemark	San Benito		3,212	3,016	2,741	x	x	
Rio Linda	Sacramento							
Rio Oso	Sutter							
Rio del Mar	Santa Cruz		9,128	9,216	9,198	8,919	7,067	
Ripley	Riverside		538	692	x	x	x	
River Pines	Amador		390	379	x	x	x	
Riverdale	Fresno		3,477	3,153	2,416	1,980	1,866	Listed as an unincorporated community in the 1960 U.S. census (pop. 1,012); and the 1970 U.S. census (pop. 1,722)
Riverdale Park	Stanislaus		1,053	1,128	1,094	x	x	
Rivergrove	Kern		195	x	x	x	x	
Robbins	Sutter							
Robinson Mill	Butte		89	80	x	x	x	
Rodeo	Contra Costa		9,653	8,679	8,717	7,589	8,286	First listed as an unincorporated place in the 1970 U.S. census (pop. 5,356)
Rodriguez Camp	Tulare		133	156	x	x	x	
Rolling Hills	Madera		793	742	x	x	x	
Rollingwood	Contra Costa		3,015	2,969	2,900	x	x	
Romoland	Riverside		2,005	1,684	x	x	x	A CDP of the same name was deleted in 2008 after being incorporated into the city of Menifee; and a new CDP was formed in the 2010 U.S. Census from area adjacent to the original CDP.
Rosamond	Kern		20,961	18,150	14,349	7,430	2,869	Listed as an unincorporated place in the 1970 U.S. census (pop. 2,281)
Rose Hills	Los Angeles		2,927	2,803	x	x	x	
Rosedale	Kern		18,639	14,058	8,445	4,673	x	
Rosemont	Sacramento							
Rossmoor	Orange		10,625	10,244	10,298	x	x	
Rough and Ready	Nevada							
Round Mountain	Shasta		160	155	122	x	x	
Round Valley	Inyo		482	435	278	x	x	
Rouse	Stanislaus							
Rowland Heights	Los Angeles		48,231	48,993	48,553	42,647	28,252	Listed as an unincorporated place in the 1970 U.S. census (pop. 16,881)
Rumsey	Yolo		91	x	x	x	x	
Running Springs	San Bernardino		5,268	4,862	5,125	4,195	x	
Ruth	Trinity							
Rutherford	Napa		115	164	x	x	x	
Sage	Riverside		3,370	x	x	x	x	
Salida	Stanislaus							
Salmon Creek	Sonoma		111	86	x	x	x	
Salton City	Imperial		5,155	3,763	978	x	x	
Salton Sea Beach	Imperial		508	422	392	x	x	
Salyer	Trinity		389	x	x	x	x	
Samoa	Humboldt		229	258	x	x	x	
San Andreas	Calaveras		2,994	2,783	2,615	x	x	
San Antonio Heights	San Bernardino		3,441	3,371	3,122	2,935	x	
San Ardo	Monterey		392	517	501	x	x	
San Diego Country Estates	San Diego		10,395	10,109	9,262	6,874	x	
San Geronimo	Marin		510	446	436	x	x	
San Lorenzo	Alameda		29,581	23,452	21,898	19,987	20,545	Listed as an unincorporated community in the 1960 U.S. census (pop. 23,773) and the 1970 U.S. census (pop. 24,633)
San Lucas	Monterey		324	269	419	x	x	
San Martin	Santa Clara							
San Miguel	Contra Costa		3,591	3,392	x	x	x	
San Miguel	San Luis Obispo							
San Pasqual	Los Angeles		2,101	2,041	x	x	x	
San Simeon	San Luis Obispo							
Santa Margarita	San Luis Obispo							
Santa Nella	Merced		2,211	1,380	x	x	x	
Santa Rosa Valley	Ventura		3,312	3,334	x	x	x	
Santa Susana	Ventura		1,160	1,037	x	x	x	
Santa Venetia	Marin		4,289	4,292	4,298	3,362	x	
Santa Ynez	Santa Barbara		4,505	4,418	4,584	4,200	3,335	
Saranap	Contra Costa		5,830	5,202	x	x	x	
Saticoy	Ventura		1,133	1,029	x	x	x	
Sattley	Sierra		44	49	x	x	x	
Scotia	Humboldt		681	850	x	x	x	
Sea Ranch	Sonoma		1,169	1,305	x	x	x	
Seacliff	Santa Cruz		3,280	3,267	x	x	x	
Searles Valley	San Bernardino		1,565	1,739	1,885	2,740	3,439	Listed as an unincorporated place in the 1970 U.S. Census (pop. 3,828)
Seeley	Imperial		1,729	1,739	1,624	1,228	1,058	
Sequoia Crest	Tulare		24	10	x	x	x	
Sereno del Mar	Sonoma		107	126	x	x	x	
Seville	Tulare		446	480	x	x	x	
Shandon	San Luis Obispo		1,168	1,295	986	x	x	
Shasta	Shasta							
Shaver Lake	Fresno		580	634	705	x	x	
Sheep Ranch	Calaveras		x	x	x	x	x	New CDP in 2023
Shell Ridge	Contra Costa		1,014	959	x	x	x	
Shelter Cove	Humboldt		803	693	x	x	x	
Sheridan	Placer		1,385	1,238	x	x	x	
Shingle Springs	El Dorado		4,660	4,432	2,643	2,049	1,268	
Shingletown	Shasta					x	x	
Shoshone	Inyo		22	31	52	x	x	
Sierra Brooks	Sierra		467	478	x	x	x	
Sierra City	Sierra		235	221	x	x	x	
Sierra Village	Tuolumne		411	456	x	x	x	Formed from part of the Mi-Wuk Village CDP and additional area.
Sierraville	Sierra		239	200	x	x	x	
Silver City	Tulare		0	0	x	x	x	
Silver Lakes	San Bernardino		6,317	5,623	x	x	x	Also listed as Helendale
Silverado	Orange		932	x	x	x	x	
Silverado Resort	Napa		948	1,095	x	x	x	
Sisquoc	Santa Barbara		191	183	x	x	x	
Sky Valley	Riverside		2,411	2,406	x	x	x	
Sleepy Hollow	Marin		2,401	2,384	x	x	x	
Smartsville	Yuba		185	177	x	x	x	
Smith Corner	Kern		594	524	x	x	x	
Smith River	Del Norte		906	866	x	x	x	
Snelling	Merced		238	231	x	x	x	
Soda Bay	Lake							
Soda Springs	Nevada							
Somis	Ventura		1,429	x	x	x	x	
Sonoma State University	Sonoma		2,679	x	x	x	x	
Soquel	Santa Cruz		9,980	9,644	5,081	9,188	6,212	Listed as an unincorporated place in the 1970 U.S. census (pop. 5,795)
Soulsbyville	Tuolumne		2,092	2,215	1,729	7,732	x	
South Dos Palos	Merced							
South Monrovia Island	Los Angeles		6,515	6,777	x	x	x	
South Oroville	Butte		3,235	5,742	7,695	7,463	7,246	First appeared as an unincorporated place in the 1960 U.S. census (pop. 3,704) and the 1970 U.S. census (pop. 4,111).
South San Gabriel	Los Angeles		7,920	8,070	7,595	7,700	5,421	Listed as an unincorporated community in the 1970 U.S. census (pop. 5051)
South San Jose Hills	Los Angeles		19,855	20,551	20,218	17,814	16,049	Listed as an unincorporated community in the 1970 U.S. census (pop. 12,386)
South Taft	Kern		2,100	2,169	1,898	2,170	2,073	Listed as an unincorporated place in the 1960 U.S. census (1,910) and the 1970 U.S. census (pop. 2,214)
South Whittier	Los Angeles		56,415	57,156	55,193	49,514	43,815	Listed as an unincorporated community in the 1970 U.S. census (pop. 46,461)
Spaulding	Lassen		206	178	x	x	x	
Spreckels	Monterey		692	673	485	x	x	
Spring Garden	Plumas		19	16	55	x	x	
Spring Valley	San Diego		30,998	28,205	26,663	55,331	40,191	Listed as an unincorporated place in the 1970 U.S. census (pop. 29,742)
Spring Valley	Lake							
Spring Valley Lake	San Bernardino		9,598	8,220	x	x	x	
Springville	Tulare		967	934	1,109	x	x	
Yokuts Valley	Fresno		3,564	3,162	2,691	2,161	x	Formerly named Squaw Valley; renamed Yokuts Valley after the 2020 U.S. census
Squirrel Mountain Valley	Kern		760	547	498	x	x	
Stallion Springs	Kern		3,139	2,488	1,522	x	x	
Stanford	Santa Clara							
Stebbins	Kern		1,423	x	x	x	x	
Stevenson Ranch	Los Angeles		20,178	17,557	x	x	x	
Stevinson	Merced		273	313	x	x	x	
Stinson Beach	Marin		541	632	751	x	x	
Stirling City	Butte		284	295	x	x	x	
Stones Landing	Lassen		86	x	x	x	x	
Stonyford	Colusa		133	149	x	x	x	
Stratford	Kings		1,121	1,277	1,264	x	x	
Strathmore	Tulare		2,830	2,819	2,584	2,353	1,955	First appeared as an unincorporated place in the 1960 U.S. census (pop. 1,095) and the 1970 U.S. census (pop. 1,221).
Strawberry	Marin		5,447	5,393	5,302	4,377	x	
Strawberry	Tuolumne		87	86	x	x	x	
Sugarloaf Saw Mill	Tulare		14	18	x	x	x	
Sugarloaf Village	Tulare		7	10	x	x	x	
Sultana	Tulare		183	775	x	x	x	
Summerland	Santa Barbara		1,222	1,448	1,545	x	x	
Sun Village	Los Angeles		12,345	11,565	x	x	x	
Sunny Slopes	Mono		139	182	x	x	x	
Sunnyside	Fresno		4,627	4,235	x	x	x	
Sunnyside-Tahoe City	Placer							
Sunol	Alameda		922	913	1,332	x	x	
Sutter	Sutter							
Swall Meadows	Mono		178	220	x	x	x	
Taft Heights	Kern		1,999	1,949	1,865	2,050	2,211	Listed as an unincorporated place in the 1950 U.S. census (pop. 2,176), 1960 U.S. census (pop. 2,661), and the 1970 U.S. census (pop. 2,108)
Taft Mosswood	San Joaquin		1,626	1,530	1,388	x	x	
Tahoe Vista	Placer							
Tahoma	El Dorado, Placer		1,034	1,191	x	x	x	
Talmage	Mendocino		986	1,130	1,141	x	x	
Tamalpais-Homestead Valley	Marin		11,492	10,735	10,691	9,601	8,511	
Tancred	Yolo		89	x	x	x	x	
Tara Hills	Contra Costa		5,364	5,126	5,332	4,998	x	
Tarina	Kern		18	x	x	x	x	
Tarpey Village	Fresno		3,997	3,888	x	x	x	
Taylorsville	Plumas		123	140	154	x	x	
Tecopa	Inyo		120	150	99	x	x	
Temelec	Sonoma		1,500	1,441	1,556	1,594	x	
Temescal Valley	Riverside		26,232	22,535	x	x	x	
Templeton	San Luis Obispo		8,386					
Tennant	Siskiyou		63	41	63	x	x	
Terminous	San Joaquin		429	381	x	x	x	First appeared as a census designated place in the 2010 U.S. census, one of ten CDPS (Acampo, Collierville, Dogtown, Mountain House, Peters, Terminous, Thornton, Victor, Waterloo, and Woodbridge) formed out of the deleted North Woodbridge CDP and South Woodbridge CDP.
Terra Bella	Tulare		2,910	3,310	3,466	2,740	1,807	First appeared as an unincorporated place in the 1970 U.S. census (pop. 1,037).
Teviston	Tulare		1,185	1,215	x	x	x	
Thermal	Riverside		2,676	2,865	x	x	x	
Thermalito	Butte		7,198	6,646	6,045	5,646	4,961	First appeared as an unincorporated place in the 1970 U.S. census (pop. 4,217).
Thornton	San Joaquin		1,004	1,131	x	x	x	First appeared as a census designated place in the 2010 U.S. census, one of ten CDPS (Acampo, Collierville, Dogtown, Mountain House, Peters, Terminous, Thornton, Victor, Waterloo, and Woodbridge) formed out of the deleted North Woodbridge CDP and South Woodbridge CDP.
Thousand Palms	Riverside		7,967	7,715	5,120	4,122	1,718	
Three Rivers	Tulare		2,053	2,182	2,248	x	x	
Three Rocks	Fresno		248	246	x	x	x	
Timber Cove	Sonoma		171	164	x	x	x	
Tipton	Tulare		2,519	2,543	1,790	1,383	1,185	
Tobin	Plumas		19	12	11	x	x	
Tomales	Marin		187	204	210	x	x	
Tonyville	Tulare		329	316	x	x	x	
Tooleville	Tulare		286	339	x	x	x	
Topanga	Los Angeles		8,560	8,289	x	x	x	
Topaz	Mono		150	50	x	x	x	
Toro Canyon	Santa Barbara		1,835	1,508	1,697	x	x	
Trabuco Canyon	Orange		1,020	x	x	x	x	
Tranquillity	Fresno		805	799	813	x	x	
Traver	Tulare		731	713	732	x	x	
Tres Pinos	San Benito							
Trinity Center	Trinity							
Trinity Village	Trinity							
Trona	Inyo		11	10	x	x	x	Split from the Homewood Canyon-Valley Wells CDP prior to the 2010 U.S. census
Trowbridge	Sutter							
Tuolumne City	Tuolumne		1,798	1,779	1,865	1,686	1,708	First listed as an unincorporated community in the 1960 U.S. census (pop 1,403) and 1970 U.S. census (pop 1,365)
Tupman	Kern		177	161	227	x	x	
Tuttle	Merced		102	103	x	x	x	
Tuttletown	Tuolumne		787	668	x	x	x	
Twain	Plumas		75	82	87	x	x	
Twain Harte	Tuolumne		2,378	2,226	2,586	2,170	1,369	Listed as an unincorporated place in the 1970 U.S. census (pop 1,484)
Twin Lakes	Mono		45	x	x	x	x	
Twin Lakes	Santa Cruz		4,944	4,917	5,533	5,379	4,502	Listed as an unincorporated place in the 1970 U.S. census (pop. 3,012)
University of California-Davis	Yolo		8,525	5,786	x	x	x	
University of California-Merced	Merced		0	0	x	x	x	First listed in 2010 but has zero population in both 2010 and 2020.
University of California-Santa Barbara	Santa Barbara		9,710	x	x	x	x	
Upper Lake	Lake		1,095	1,052	989	x	x	
Val Verde	Los Angeles		2,399	2,468	1,472	1,689	x	
Valinda	Los Angeles		22,437	22,822	21,776	18,735	18,700	Listed as an unincorporated community in the 1970 U.S. census (pop. 18,837)
Valle Vista	Riverside		16,194	14,578	10,488	8,751	5,474	
Vallecito	Calaveras		442	442	427	x	x	
Valley Acres	Kern		504	527	512	x	x	
Valley Center	San Diego		10,087	9,277	7,323	1,711	1,242	
Valley Ford	Sonoma		148	147	x	x	x	
Valley Home	Stanislaus							
Valley Ranch	Plumas		128	109	92	x	x	
Valley Springs	Calaveras		3,779	3,553	2,560	x	x	
Valley Wells	Inyo		0	0	x	x	x	Split from the Homewood Canyon-Valley Wells CDP prior to the 2010 U.S. census
Vandenberg AFB	Santa Barbara		3,559	3,338	6,151	9,846	8,136	Listed as an unincorporated community in the 1970 U.S. census (pop. 13,393)
Vandenberg Village	Santa Barbara		7,308	6,497	5,802	5,971	5,839	Listed as an unincorporated community in the 1970 U.S. census (pop. 4,874)
Verdi	Sierra		179	162	x	x	x	
Victor	San Joaquin		313	293	x	x	x	First appeared as a census designated place in the 2010 U.S. census, one of ten CDPS (Acampo, Collierville, Dogtown, Mountain House, Peters, Terminous, Thornton, Victor, Waterloo, and Woodbridge) formed out of the deleted North Woodbridge CDP and South Woodbridge CDP.
View Park-Windsor Hills	Los Angeles		11,419	11,075	10,958	11,769	12,101	Listed as an unincorporated community in the 1970 U.S. census (pop. 12,268)
Vina	Tehama		198	237	x	x	x	
Vincent	Los Angeles		15,714	15,922	15,097	13,713	x	
Vine Hill	Contra Costa		4,323	3,761	3,260	3,214	6,129	Listed as Vine-Hill-Pacheco in the 1980 U.S. census
Vineyard	Sacramento		43,935	24,836	10,109	x	x	
Virginia Lakes	Mono		7	x	x	x	x	
Vista Santa Rosa	Riverside		2,607	2,926	x	x	x	
Volcano	Amador		104	115	x	x	x	
Volta	Merced		366	246	x	x	x	
Walker	Mono		704	721	x	x	x	
Wallace	Calaveras		479	403	220	x	x	
Walnut Grove	Sacramento		669	1,542	1,452	x	x	
Walnut Park	Los Angeles		15,214	15,966	16,180	14,722	11,811	Listed as an unincorporated community in the 1970 U.S. census (pop. 8,925)
Warm Springs	Riverside		1,586	2,676	x	x	x	
Warner Valley	Plumas		8	2	x	x	x	
Washington	Nevada							
Waterloo	San Joaquin		534	572	x	x	x	First appeared as a census designated place in the 2010 U.S. census, one of ten CDPS (Acampo, Collierville, Dogtown, Mountain House, Peters, Terminous, Thornton, Victor, Waterloo, and Woodbridge) formed out of the deleted North Woodbridge CDP and South Woodbridge CDP.
Waukena	Tulare		80	108	x	x	x	
Wautec	Humboldt		48	x	x	x	x	
Wawona	Mariposa		111	169	x	x	x	
Weaverville	Trinity							
Weedpatch	Kern		2,206	2,658	2,726	1,892	1,553	
Weitchpec	Humboldt		112	x	x	x	x	
Weldon	Kern		2,303	2,642	2,387	x	x	
Weott	Humboldt		219	288	x	x	x	
West Athens	Los Angeles		9,393	8,729	9,101	8,729	8,531	Listed as an unincorporated community in the 1970 U.S. census (pop. 13, 286)
West Bishop	Inyo		2,754	2,607	2,807	2,908	x	
West Carson	Los Angeles		22,870	21,699	21,138	20,143	17,997	Listed as an unincorporated community in the 1970 U.S. census (pop. 15,918)
West Goshen	Tulare		536	511	x	x	x	
West Menlo Park	San Mateo							
West Modesto	Stanislaus		5,965	5,682	6,096	x	x	
West Park	Fresno		1,053	1,157	x	x	x	
West Point	Calaveras		688	674	746	x	x	
West Puente Valley	Los Angeles		22,959	22,636	22,589	20,254	20,445	Listed as an unincorporated community in the 1970 U.S. census (pop. 20,733)
West Rancho Dominguez	Los Angeles		24,347	5,669	5,435	5,451	5,907	Listed as an unincorporated community (pop. 5,748) in the 1970 U.S. census
West Whittier-Los Nietos	Los Angeles		25,325	25,540	25,129	24,164	21,001	Listed as an unincorporated community in the 1970 U.S. census (pop. 20,845)
Westhaven-Moonstone	Humboldt		1,187	1,205	1,044	1,109	x	
Westley	Stanislaus		575	603	747	x	x	
Westmont	Los Angeles		33,913	31,853	31,623	31,044	27,916	Listed as an unincorporated community in the 1970 U.S. census (pop. 29,310)
Westside	Fresno		143	x	x	x	x	
Westwood	Lassen							
Whitehawk	Plumas		144	113	96	x	x	
Whitewater	Riverside		984	859	x	x	x	
Whitley Gardens	San Luis Obispo							
Whitmore	Shasta		311	x	x	x	x	
Wilkerson	Inyo		543	563	562	x	x	
Wilseyville	Calaveras		x	x	x	x	x	New CDP in 2023
Williams Canyon	Orange		93	x	x	x	x	
Willow Creek	Humboldt		1,720	1,710	1,743	1,576	x	
Willowbrook	Los Angeles		24,295	35,983	34,138	32,772	30,845	Listed as an unincorporated community in the 1970 U.S. census (pop. 28,705)
Wilsonia	Tulare		14	5	x	x	x	
Wilton	Sacramento							
Winchester	Riverside		3,068	2,534	2,155	1,689	x	
Winter Gardens	San Diego		22,380	20,631	19,771	x	x	
Winterhaven	Imperial		390	394	529	x	x	
Winton	Merced							
Wofford Heights	Kern		2,213	2,200	2,276	2,270	2,112	
Woodacre	Marin		1,410	1,348	1,393	1,478	1,300	
Woodbridge	San Joaquin		4,031	3,984	x	3,456	1,682	First appeared as an unincorporated place in the 1970 U.S. census (pop. 1,397) and as a census designated place in the 1980 U.S. census. It was deleted after being split into the North Woodbridge CDP and South Woodbridge CDP prior to the 2000 U.S. census. It reappeared prior to the 2010 U.S. census, one of ten CDPS (Acampo, Collierville, Dogtown, Mountain House, Peters, Terminous, Thornton, Victor, Waterloo, and Woodbridge) formed out of the deleted North Woodbridge CDP and South Woodbridge CDP.
Woodcrest	Riverside		15,378	14,347	8,342	7,796	x	
Woodlands	San Luis Obispo							
Woodville	Tulare		1,680	1,740	1,678	1,557	1,507	First appeared as an unincorporated place in the 1960 U.S. census (pop. 1,045) and the 1970 U.S. census (pop. 1,031).
Woodville Farm Labor Camp	Tulare		729	x	x	x	x	
Woody	Kern		108	x	x	x	x	
Wrightwood	San Bernardino		4,720	4,525	3,837	3,308	2,511	
Yankee Hill	Butte		260	333	x	x	x	Formed from part of Concow CDP and additional area)
Yermo	San Bernardino		623	x	x	x	x	
Yettem	Tulare		201	211	x	x	x	
Yolo	Yolo		425	450	x	x	x	
Yosemite Lakes	Madera							
Yosemite Valley	Mariposa		337	1,035	200	x	x	
Yosemite West	Mariposa		47	x	x	x	x	
Zayante	Santa Cruz		729	705	x	x	x	

== Former census designated places in California ==
CDP	County	Location of County	Population (2020)	Population (2010)	Population (2000)	Population (1990)	Population (1980)	Notes
Bayview-Montalvin	Contra Costa		x	x	5,004	3,988	x	Split into the Bayview CDP and the Montalvin Manor CDP; and part annexed to the city of Pinole prior to the 2010 U.S. Census
Bonadelle Ranchos-Madera Ranchos	Madera		x	8,569	7,300	5,705	3,272	Split into Bonadelle Ranchos CDP and Madera Ranchos CDP prior to the 2010 U.S. census.
Buena Vista	Santa Clara		x	x	1,704	x	x	Annexed to the city of San Jose prior to the 2010 U.S. census
Calwa	Fresno		x	x	x	x	6,640	First listed as an unincorporated community in the 1970 U.S. census (pop 5,191) and as a CDP in the 1980 United States census (pop. 6,640); annexed by the city of Fresno prior to the 1990 U.S. census. Not to be confused with the existing Calwa CDP.
Crestmore Heights	Riverside		x	384	x	x	x	Incorporated into the city of Jurupa Valley in 2011
Crescent City North	Del Norte		x	x	4,028	3,853	2,846	First appeared as an unincorporated community in the 1960 U.S. census (pop. 3,086) under the name Crescent Northwest. The name was changed to Crescent North in the 1970 U.S. census (pop. 3,053). In the 1980 U.S. census, it was redesignated as a census designated place. It was deleted prior to the 2010 U.S. census after being partially annexed to Crescent City.
Eastvale	Riverside		x	53,668	x	x	x	Incorporated in 2010 after the census
El Toro Station	Orange		x	x	x	6,869	7,632	First appeared as an unincorporated community in the 1970 U.S. census (pop 6,970). Deleted prior to the 2000 U.S. census after the airbase was closed
Foothill Ranch	Orange		x	x	10,899	x	x	Annexed to Lake Forest city prior to the 2010 U.S. census)
Glen Avon	Riverside		x					Incorporated into the city of Jurupa Valley in 2011
Goleta	Santa Barbara		x	x	55,204	x	x	Incorporated into the city of Goleta in 2001
Greenacres	Kern		x	x	x			Deleted prior to the 2000 U.S. Census; part annexed to city of Bakersfield
Groveland-Big Oak Flat	Tuolumne		x	x	3,388	2,753	x	Split into the Groveland CDP and the Pine Mountain Lake CDP prior to the 2010 U.S. census.
Highlands-Baywood Park	San Mateo		x	4,027	4,210	2,644	x	Prior to the 2020 U.S. census, the CDP was split into the Highlands CDP and the Baywood Park CDP.
Laguna West-Lakeside	Sacramento		x	x	8,414	x	x	Annexed by Elk Grove city prior to the 2010 U.S. census
Mather AFB	Sacramento		x	x	x	4,885	5,245	Deleted; merged into the Rancho Cordova CDP prior to the 2000 U.S. census after the Mather Air Force Base was closed in 1993. Listed as an incorporated place in the 1970 U.S. census (pop. 7,027)
Mira Loma	Riverside		x					Incorporated into the city of Jurupa Valley in 2011
Newport Coast	Orange		x	x		x	x	Annexed to Newport Beach city prior to the 2010 U.S. census
North Woodbridge	San Joaquin		x	x	1,320	x	x	First appeared as a census designated place in the 2000 U.S. census; deleted prior to the 2010 U.S. census along with the South Woodbridge CDP to form ten new CDPS (Acampo, Collierville, Dogtown, Mountain House, Peters, Terminous, Thornton, Victor, Waterloo, and Woodbridge).
Palmdale East	Los Angeles		x	x	x			Annexed to the city of Palmdale prior to the 2000 U.S. census
Parkway–South Sacramento	Sacramento		x	x				
Pedley	Riverside		x					Incorporated into the city of Jurupa Valley in 2011
Phoenix Lake-Cedar Ridge	Tuolumne							
Point Dume	Los Angeles		x	x	x			Annexed to city of Mailbu
Portola Hills	Orange		x	x	6,391	x	x	Annexed to city of Lake Forest
Rancho Cordova	Sacramento		x	x	55,060	48,731	42,881	First appeared as an unincorporated place in the 1960 U.S. census (pop. 7,429) and 1970 U.S. census (pop. 30,451); Deleted prior to the 2010 U.S. census after being incorporated as a city. The Mather CDP was created at the same time as it was not part of the incorporation..
Romoland	Riverside		x	x	2,764	2,319	1,349	Annexed to city of Menifee; a new CDP was formed in the 2010 U.S. Census from area adjacent to the original CDP.
Rubidoux	Riverside		x					Incorporated into the city of Jurupa Valley in 2011
San Joaquin Hills	Orange		x	x	2,959	x	x	Annexed to Newport Beach city prior to the 2010 U.S. census
Seven Trees	Santa Clara		x	x	1,666	x	x	Annexed to the city of San Jose prior to the 2010 U.S. census
Shackelford	Stanislaus		x	3,371	5,170	x	x	Annexed to the city of Modesto in 2012
South Lake	Kern		x	x	x	1,059	x	Deleted prior to the 2000 U.S. Census; part absorbed by Weldon CDP
South Santa Rosa	Santa Clara		x	x	4,128	x	x	Annexed to the city of Santa Rosa prior to the 2010 U.S. census
South Woodbridge	San Joaquin		x	x	2,825	x	x	First appeared as a census designated place in the 2000 U.S. census; deleted prior to the 2010 U.S. census along with the North Woodbridge CDP to form ten new CDPS (Acampo, Collierville, Dogtown, Mountain House, Peters, Terminous, Thornton, Victor, Waterloo, and Woodbridge).
Storrie	Plumas		x	4	5	x	x	Deleted prior to 2020 U.S. census
Sugarloaf Mountain Park	Tulare		x	0	x	x	x	Listed as a CDP in the 2010 census with zero population; deleted prior to the 2020 census.
Sunnyslope	Riverside		x	5153	4437	3766	x	Incorporated into the city of Jurupa Valley in 2011
Sunol-Midtown	Santa Clara		x	x	748	x	x	Annexed to the city of San Jose prior to the 2010 U.S. census
Trabuco Highlands	Orange		x	x	x	3,191	x	Deleted prior to the 2000 U.S. census; part annexed to Rancho Santa Margarita city
