= Collierville =

Collierville may refer to:

- Collierville, California
- Collierville, Tennessee
