= Dogtown, San Joaquin County, California =

Dogtown
- census-designated place
- Position in California.
- Coordinates: 38°12′31″N 121°09′17″W
- Country: United States
- State: California
- County: San Joaquin

Area
  - Total: 12.989 sq mi (33.641 km^{2})
  - Land: 12.967 sq mi (33.584 km^{2})
  - Water: 0.022 sq mi (0.057 km^{2}) 0.17%
- Elevation: 115 ft (35 m)

Population (2020)
  - Total: 2,516
  - Density: 194.0/sq mi (74.92/km^{2})
- Time zone: UTC-8 (Pacific (PST))
  - Summer (DST): UTC-7 (PDT)
- GNIS feature ID: 2582997

Dogtown is a census-designated place in San Joaquin County, California. Dogtown sits at an elevation of 115 feet (35 m). The 2020 United States census reported Dogtown's population was 2,516, which is up from 2,506 in the 2010 United States census.

== Geography ==
According to the United States Census Bureau, the CDP covers an area of 13.0 square miles (33.6 km^{2}), 99.83% of it land and 0.17% of it water.

== Demographics ==
Historical population
Census	Pop.	Note	%±
2010	2,506		—
2020	2,516		0.4%
U.S. Decennial Census; 1860–1870 1880-1890; 1900 1910 1920; 1930 1940 1950; 1960 1970 1980; 1990 2000 2010

Dogtown first appeared as a census designated place in the 2010 U.S. census, one of ten CDPS (Acampo, Collierville, Dogtown, Mountain House, Peters, Terminous, Thornton, Victor, Waterloo, and Woodbridge) formed out of the deleted North Woodbridge CDP and South Woodbridge CDP.

The 2020 United States census reported that Dogtown had a population of 2,516. The population density was 194.0 inhabitants per square mile (74.9/km^{2}). The racial makeup of Dogtown was 69.1% White, 1.3% African American, 0.7% Native American, 2.7% Asian, 0.5% Pacific Islander, 11.6% from other races, and 14.2% from two or more races. Hispanic or Latino of any race were 26.0% of the population.

The whole population lived in households. There were 885 households, out of which 29.5% included children under the age of 18, 64.5% were married-couple households, 5.2% were cohabiting couple households, 15.7% had a female householder with no partner present, and 14.6% had a male householder with no partner present. 20.1% of households were one person, and 11.9% were one person aged 65 or older. The average household size was 2.84. There were 662 families (74.8% of all households).

The age distribution was 20.2% under the age of 18, 7.7% aged 18 to 24, 21.7% aged 25 to 44, 29.7% aged 45 to 64, and 20.8% who were 65 years of age or older. The median age was 45.3 years. For every 100 females, there were 99.8 males.

There were 933 housing units at an average density of 72.0 units per square mile (27.8 units/km^{2}), of which 885 (94.9%) were occupied. Of these, 80.7% were owner-occupied, and 19.3% were occupied by renters.

In 2023, the US Census Bureau estimated that the median household income was $126,042, and the per capita income was $52,405. About 1.8% of families and 5.9% of the population were below the poverty line.
