= Thornton, California =

Thornton
- census-designated place
- Location in San Joaquin County and the state of California

- Location within California Location within the United States
- Coordinates: 38°13′34″N 121°25′29″W
- Country: United States
- State: California
- County: San Joaquin

Area
  - Total: 2.184 sq mi (5.656 km^{2})
  - Land: 2.133 sq mi (5.525 km^{2})
  - Water: 0.051 sq mi (0.131 km^{2}) 2.31%
- Elevation: 13 ft (4.0 m)

Population (2020)
  - Total: 1,004
  - Density: 470.7/sq mi (181.7/km^{2})
- Time zone: UTC-8 (Pacific (PST))
  - Summer (DST): UTC-7 (PDT)
- ZIP code: 95686
- Area code: 209
- GNIS feature IDs: 236291; 2628795

Thornton is a census-designated place (CDP) in San Joaquin County, California, United States. Thornton is located along Interstate 5 7 miles (11 km) west-southwest of Galt. Thornton has a post office with ZIP code 95686. As of the 2020 census, Thornton had a population of 1,004.

== History ==
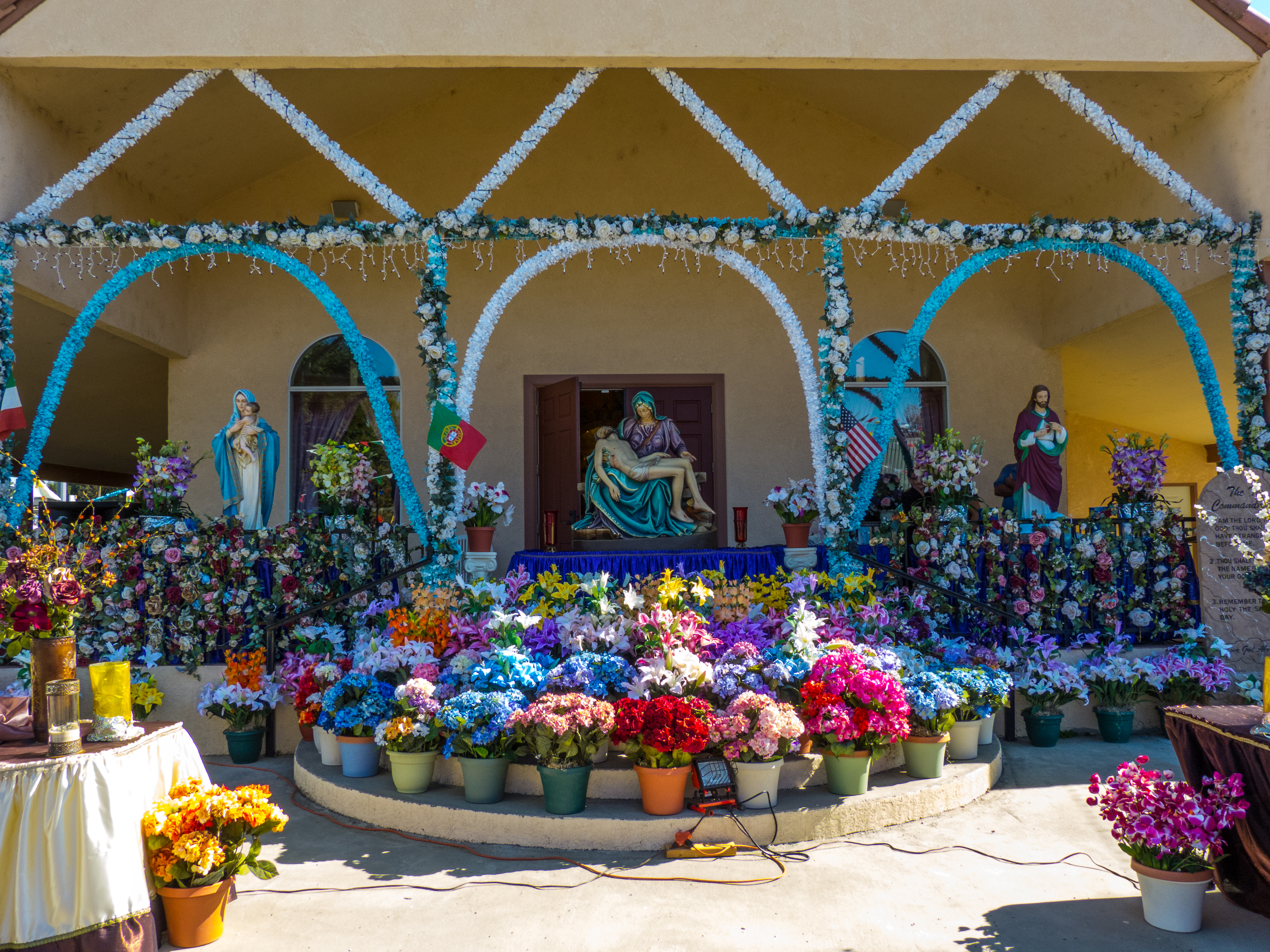
The local Portuguese festival of Our Lady of Fatima

The Western Pacific Railroad was extended to Thornton in 1907. A post office called Thornton has been in operation since 1910. The community was named for Arthur Thornton, the original owner of the town site.

== Geography ==
According to the United States Census Bureau, the CDP covers an area of 2.2 square miles (5.7 km^{2}), 97.69% of it land, and 2.31% of it water.

== Demographics ==
Historical population
Census	Pop.	Note	%±
2010	1,131		—
2020	1,004		−11.2%
U.S. Decennial Census; 1860–1870 1880-1890; 1900 1910 1920; 1930 1940 1950; 1960 1970 1980; 1990 2000 2010

Thornton first appeared as a census designated place in the 2010 U.S. census, one of ten CDPS (Acampo, Collierville, Dogtown, Mountain House, Peters, Terminous, Thornton, Victor, Waterloo, and Woodbridge) formed out of the deleted North Woodbridge CDP and South Woodbridge CDP.

=== 2020 census ===
As of the 2020 census, Thornton had a population of 1,004. The population density was 470.7 inhabitants per square mile (181.7/km^{2}).

Racial composition as of the 2020 census
Race	Number	Percent
White	307	30.6%
Black or African American	38	3.8%
American Indian and Alaska Native	7	0.7%
Asian	54	5.4%
Native Hawaiian and Other Pacific Islander	2	0.2%
Some other race	407	40.5%
Two or more races	189	18.8%
Hispanic or Latino (of any race)	654	65.1%

0.0% of residents lived in urban areas, while 100.0% lived in rural areas. The census reported that 995 people (99.1% of the population) lived in households, 9 (0.9%) lived in non-institutionalized group quarters, and no one was institutionalized.

There were 323 households, of which 115 (35.6%) had children under the age of 18 living in them. Of all households, 159 (49.2%) were married-couple households, 18 (5.6%) were cohabiting couple households, 80 (24.8%) had a female householder with no partner present, and 66 (20.4%) had a male householder with no partner present. 81 households (25.1%) were one person, and 36 (11.1%) were one person aged 65 or older. The average household size was 3.08. There were 223 families (69.0% of all households).

The age distribution was 260 people (25.9%) under the age of 18, 111 people (11.1%) aged 18 to 24, 246 people (24.5%) aged 25 to 44, 240 people (23.9%) aged 45 to 64, and 147 people (14.6%) who were 65 years of age or older. The median age was 35.2 years. For every 100 females, there were 101.6 males, and for every 100 females age 18 and over there were 92.7 males age 18 and over.

There were 337 housing units at an average density of 158.0 units per square mile (61.0 units/km^{2}), of which 323 (95.8%) were occupied. Of these, 167 (51.7%) were owner-occupied, and 156 (48.3%) were occupied by renters. The vacancy rate was 4.2%; the homeowner vacancy rate was 2.3%, and the rental vacancy rate was 4.3%.
