= Peters, California =

Peters
- census-designated place
- Location in San Joaquin County and the state of California

- Position in California.
- Coordinates: 37°58′33″N 121°02′36″W
- Country: United States
- State: California
- County: San Joaquin

Area
  - Total: 2.532 sq mi (6.558 km^{2})
  - Land: 2.526 sq mi (6.542 km^{2})
  - Water: 0.0062 sq mi (0.016 km^{2}) 0.24%
- Elevation: 112 ft (34 m)

Population (2020)
  - Total: 706
  - Density: 280/sq mi (108/km^{2})
- Time zone: UTC-8 (Pacific (PST))
  - Summer (DST): UTC-7 (PDT)
- GNIS feature ID: 2583111

Peters is a census-designated place in San Joaquin County, California. Peters sits at an elevation of 112 feet (34 m). The 2020 United States census reported Peters' population was 708, up from 672 at the 2010 United States census.

== Geography ==
According to the United States Census Bureau, the CDP covers an area of 2.5 square miles (6.6 km^{2}), 99.76% of it land and 0.24% of it water.

== Demographics ==
Historical population
Census	Pop.	Note	%±
2010	672		—
2020	708		5.4%
U.S. Decennial Census; 1860–1870 1880-1890; 1900 1910 1920; 1930 1940 1950; 1960 1970 1980; 1990 2000 2010

Peters first appeared as a census designated place in the 2010 U.S. census, one of ten CDPS (Acampo, Collierville, Dogtown, Mountain House, Peters, Terminous, Thornton, Victor, Waterloo, and Woodbridge) formed out of the deleted North Woodbridge CDP and South Woodbridge CDP.

The 2020 United States census reported that Peters had a population of 708. The population density was 280.3 inhabitants per square mile (108.2/km^{2}). The racial makeup of Peters was 490 (69.2%) White, 0 (0.0%) African American, 18 (2.5%) Native American, 16 (2.3%) Asian, 0 (0.0%) Pacific Islander, 77 (10.9%) from other races, and 107 (15.1%) from two or more races. Hispanic or Latino of any race were 182 persons (25.7%).

The whole population lived in households. There were 240 households, out of which 77 (32.1%) had children under the age of 18 living in them, 161 (67.1%) were married-couple households, 6 (2.5%) were cohabiting couple households, 27 (11.3%) had a female householder with no partner present, and 46 (19.2%) had a male householder with no partner present. 48 households (20.0%) were one person, and 19 (7.9%) were one person aged 65 or older. The average household size was 2.95. There were 184 families (76.7% of all households).

The age distribution was 142 people (20.1%) under the age of 18, 61 people (8.6%) aged 18 to 24, 155 people (21.9%) aged 25 to 44, 206 people (29.1%) aged 45 to 64, and 144 people (20.3%) who were 65 years of age or older. The median age was 44.5 years. For every 100 females, there were 93.4 males.

There were 245 housing units at an average density of 97.0 units per square mile (37.5 units/km^{2}), of which 240 (98.0%) were occupied. Of these, 184 (76.7%) were owner-occupied, and 56 (23.3%) were occupied by renters.
