= Acampo, California =

Acampo
- census-designated place
- Position in California. Acampo (California) Acampo (the United States)
- Coordinates: 38°10′19″N 121°16′49″W
- Country: United States
- State: California
- County: San Joaquin

Area
  - Total: 0.94 sq mi (2.43 km^{2})
  - Land: 0.94 sq mi (2.43 km^{2})
  - Water: 0 sq mi (0.00 km^{2}) 0%
- Elevation: 52 ft (16 m)

Population (2020)
  - Total: 334
  - Density: 356.2/sq mi (137.53/km^{2})
- Time zone: UTC-8 (Pacific (PST))
  - Summer (DST): UTC-7 (PDT)
- ZIP code: 95220
- Area code: 209
- GNIS feature ID: 2629758

Acampo (Spanish for "Pasture") is a small census-designated place (CDP) about 5 miles north of Lodi, California, United States. In the 1870s, Acampo was named as a Southern Pacific Railroad station. Acampo's population was 334 at the 2020 census.

== Name ==
Acampo was laid out in 1876 when the railroad was extended to that point. The name comes from a Spanish word for "portion of the common given to the herds for pasture". A post office called Acampo has been in operation since 1872.

== Geography ==
According to the United States Census Bureau, the CDP covers an area of 0.9 square mile (2.4 km^{2}), all land.

== Demographics ==
Historical population
Census	Pop.	Note	%±
2010	341		—
2020	334		−2.1%
U.S. Decennial Census; 1860–1870 1880-1890; 1900 1910 1920; 1930 1940 1950; 1960 1970 1980; 1990 2000 2010; 2020

Acampo first appeared as a census designated place in the 2010 U.S. census, one of ten CDPS (Acampo, Collierville, Dogtown, Mountain House, Peters, Terminous, Thornton, Victor, Waterloo, and Woodbridge) formed out of the deleted North Woodbridge CDP and South Woodbridge CDP.

=== Racial and ethnic composition ===
Acampo CDP, California – Racial and ethnic composition Note: the US Census treats Hispanic/Latino as an ethnic category. This table excludes Latinos from the racial categories and assigns them to a separate category. Hispanics/Latinos may be of any race.
Race / Ethnicity (NH = Non-Hispanic)	Pop 2010	Pop 2020	% 2010	% 2020
White alone (NH)	113	138	33.14%	41.32%
Black or African American alone (NH)	0	0	0.00%	0.00%
Native American or Alaska Native alone (NH)	0	0	0.00%	0.00%
Asian alone (NH)	3	0	0.88%	0.00%
Native Hawaiian or Pacific Islander alone (NH)	8	0	2.35%	0.00%
Other race alone (NH)	0	0	0.00%	0.00%
Mixed race or Multiracial (NH)	18	5	5.28%	1.50%
Hispanic or Latino (any race)	199	191	58.36%	57.19%
Total	341	334	100.00%	100.00%

=== 2020 census ===
As of the 2020 census, Acampo had a population of 334. The population density was 356.1 inhabitants per square mile (137.5/km^{2}). The median age was 33.9 years. 26.3% of residents were under the age of 18, 11.4% were aged 18 to 24, 20.7% were aged 25 to 44, 23.1% were aged 45 to 64, and 18.6% were 65 years of age or older. For every 100 females there were 111.4 males, and for every 100 females age 18 and over there were 101.6 males age 18 and over.

0.0% of residents lived in urban areas, while 100.0% lived in rural areas. The census reported that 100% of the population lived in households.

There were 102 households, of which 32.4% had children under the age of 18 living in them. Of all households, 56.9% were married-couple households, 5.9% were cohabiting couple households, 12.7% had a male householder with no partner present, and 24.5% had a female householder with no partner present. About 13.7% of all households were made up of individuals and 5.9% had someone living alone who was 65 years of age or older. The average household size was 3.27. There were 81 families (79.4% of all households).

There were 104 housing units at an average density of 110.9 units per square mile (42.8 units/km^{2}), of which 102 (98.1%) were occupied. Of these, 71.6% were owner-occupied, and 28.4% were occupied by renters. The homeowner vacancy rate was 0.0% and the rental vacancy rate was 0.0%.

== Education ==
Acampo students are zoned to Lodi Unified School District schools. Joe Serna Jr. Charter school is in Acampo. It is open to students of K-8th grade and specializes in teaching students in both English and Spanish. Serna shares the school campus with Houston Elementary school that operates in K-6th grades.

Oak View Elementary School District operates a single K-8 school in an unincorporated area near, but not in, Acampo. High school students in the Oak View area attend the Galt Joint Union High School District.
