= Waterloo, California =

Waterloo
- census-designated place
- Position in California.
- Coordinates: 38°02′24″N 121°10′52″W
- Country: United States
- State: California
- County: San Joaquin

Area
  - Total: 5.435 sq mi (14.076 km^{2})
  - Land: 5.435 sq mi (14.076 km^{2})
  - Water: 0 sq mi (0 km^{2}) 0%
- Elevation: 62 ft (19 m)

Population (2020)
  - Total: 534
  - Density: 98.3/sq mi (37.9/km^{2})
- Time zone: UTC-8 (Pacific (PST))
  - Summer (DST): UTC-7 (PDT)
- GNIS feature ID: 2628798

Waterloo is a census-designated place in San Joaquin County, California. Waterloo sits at an elevation of 62 feet (19 m). The 2020 United States census reported Waterloo's population was 534.

== Geography ==
According to the United States Census Bureau, the CDP covers an area of 5.4 square miles (14.1 km^{2}), all of it land.

== Demographics ==
Historical population
Census	Pop.	Note	%±
2010	572		—
2020	534		−6.6%
U.S. Decennial Census; 1860–1870 1880-1890; 1900 1910 1920; 1930 1940 1950; 1960 1970 1980; 1990 2000 2010

Waterloo first appeared as a census designated place in the 2010 U.S. census, one of ten CDPS (Acampo, Collierville, Dogtown, Mountain House, Peters, Terminous, Thornton, Victor, Waterloo, and Woodbridge) formed out of the deleted North Woodbridge CDP and South Woodbridge CDP.

The 2020 United States census reported that Waterloo had a population of 534. The population density was 98.3 inhabitants per square mile (38.0/km^{2}). The racial makeup of Waterloo was 335 (62.7%) White, 1 (0.2%) African American, 18 (3.4%) Native American, 16 (3.0%) Asian, 2 (0.4%) Pacific Islander, 100 (18.7%) from other races, and 62 (11.6%) from two or more races. Hispanic or Latino of any race were 193 persons (36.1%).

The whole population lived in households. There were 207 households, out of which 45 (21.7%) had children under the age of 18 living in them, 117 (56.5%) were married-couple households, 14 (6.8%) were cohabiting couple households, 39 (18.8%) had a female householder with no partner present, and 37 (17.9%) had a male householder with no partner present. 65 households (31.4%) were one person, and 38 (18.4%) were one person aged 65 or older. The average household size was 2.58. There were 131 families (63.3% of all households).

The age distribution was 89 people (16.7%) under the age of 18, 71 people (13.3%) aged 18 to 24, 97 people (18.2%) aged 25 to 44, 153 people (28.7%) aged 45 to 64, and 124 people (23.2%) who were 65 years of age or older. The median age was 47.0 years. For every 100 females, there were 122.5 males.

There were 217 housing units at an average density of 39.9 units per square mile (15.4 units/km^{2}), of which 207 (95.4%) were occupied. Of these, 132 (63.8%) were owner-occupied, and 75 (36.2%) were occupied by renters.
