= Terminous, California =

Terminous
- census-designated place
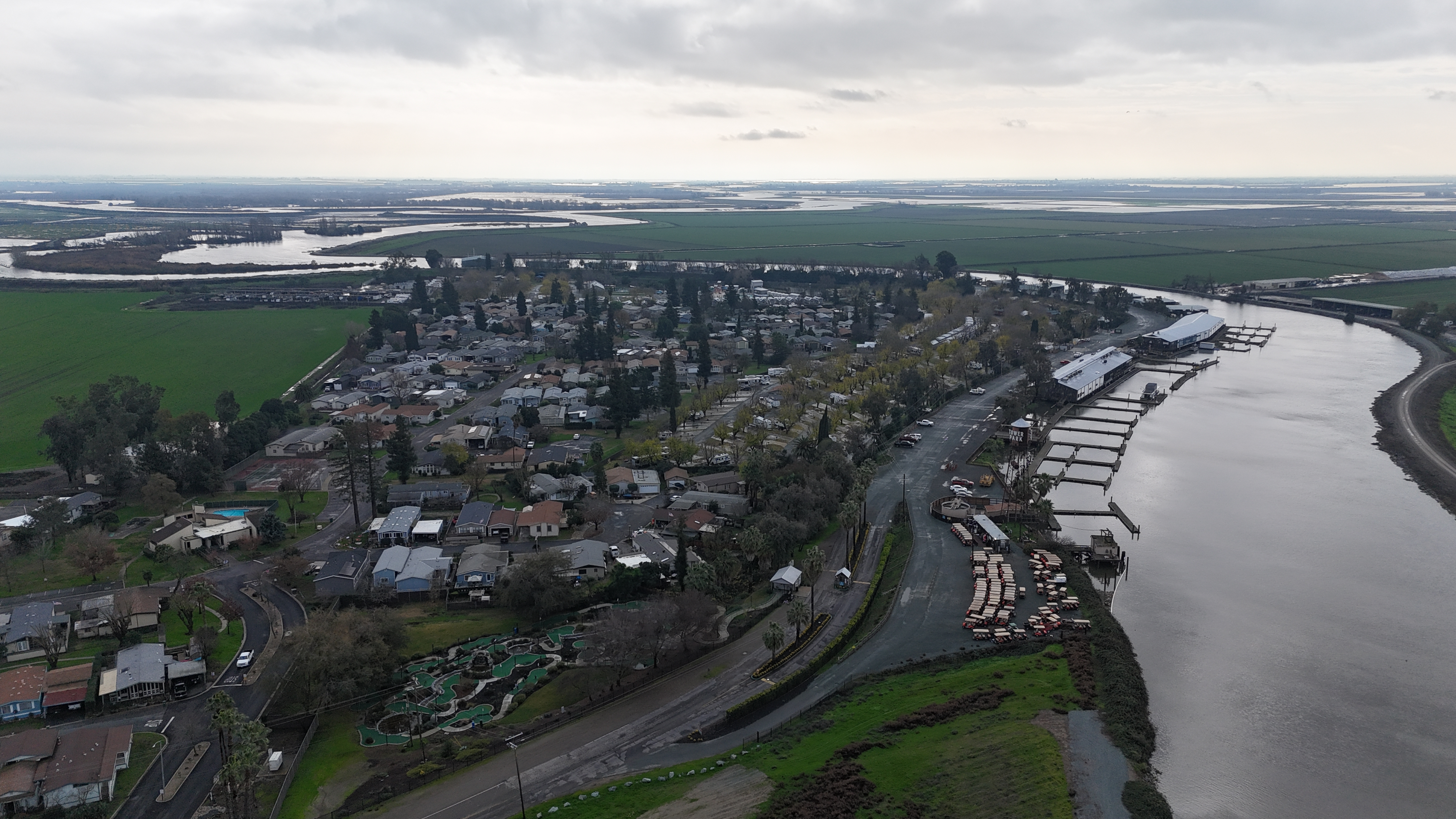
- Terminous viewed from above

- Position in California.
- Coordinates: 38°06′53″N 121°29′25″W
- Country: United States
- State: California
- County: San Joaquin

Area
  - Total: 0.977 sq mi (2.531 km^{2})
  - Land: 0.977 sq mi (2.531 km^{2})
  - Water: 0 sq mi (0 km^{2}) 0%
- Elevation: −7 ft (−2.1 m)

Population (2020)
  - Total: 429
  - Density: 439/sq mi (169/km^{2})
- Time zone: UTC-8 (Pacific (PST))
  - Summer (DST): UTC-7 (PDT)
- ZIP code: 95242
- Area code: 209
- GNIS feature ID: 2628794

Terminous is a census-designated place in San Joaquin County, California. Terminous sits at an elevation of 7 feet (2.1 m) below sea level. It is located on the Terminous Tract, an island of the Sacramento–San Joaquin River Delta. The 2020 United States census reported Terminous's population as 429.

Terminous was named from its location at the "terminus" of a road. Terminous was also the location of a Western Pacific Railroad branch for Delta growers to ship their goods.

== Geography ==
According to the United States Census Bureau, the CDP covers an area of 1.0 square miles (2.5 km^{2}), all of it land.

== Demographics ==
Historical population
| Census | Pop. | Note | %± |
|---|---|---|---|
| 2010 | 381 | | — |
| 2020 | 429 | | 12.6% |
U.S. Decennial Census; 1860–1870 1880-1890; 1900 1910 1920; 1930 1940 1950; 1960 1970 1980; 1990 2000 2010

Terminous first appeared as a census designated place in the 2010 U.S. census, one of ten CDPS (Acampo, Collierville, Dogtown, Mountain House, Peters, Terminous, Thornton, Victor, Waterloo, and Woodbridge) formed out of the deleted North Woodbridge CDP and South Woodbridge CDP.

The 2020 United States census reported that Terminous had a population of 429. The population density was 439.1 inhabitants per square mile (169.5/km^{2}). The racial makeup of Terminous was 327 (76.2%) White, 4 (0.9%) African American, 3 (0.7%) Native American, 16 (3.7%) Asian, 5 (1.2%) Pacific Islander, 32 (7.5%) from other races, and 42 (9.8%) from two or more races. Hispanic or Latino of any race were 60 persons (14.0%).

The whole population lived in households. There were 195 households, out of which 33 (16.9%) had children under the age of 18 living in them, 74 (37.9%) were married-couple households, 13 (6.7%) were cohabiting couple households, 52 (26.7%) had a female householder with no partner present, and 56 (28.7%) had a male householder with no partner present. 75 households (38.5%) were one person, and 45 (23.1%) were one person aged 65 or older. The average household size was 2.2. There were 101 families (51.8% of all households).

The age distribution was 51 people (11.9%) under the age of 18, 13 people (3.0%) aged 18 to 24, 57 people (13.3%) aged 25 to 44, 147 people (34.3%) aged 45 to 64, and 161 people (37.5%) who were 65 years of age or older. The median age was 60.4 years. For every 100 females, there were 94.1 males.

There were 221 housing units at an average density of 226.2 units per square mile (87.3 units/km^{2}), of which 195 (88.2%) were occupied. Of these, 149 (76.4%) were owner-occupied, and 46 (23.6%) were occupied by renters.
