= Choctaw Valley, California =

- Unincorporated community Census designated place
- Location within California
- Coordinates: 35°26′54.80″N 118°53′13.89″W
- Country: United States
- State: California
- County: Kern
- County Subdivision: Bakersfield CCD

Area
  - Total: 2.272 sq mi (5.88 km^{2})
  - Land: 2.272 sq mi (5.88 km^{2})
  - Water: 0 sq mi (0 km^{2})
- Elevation: 656 ft (200 m)

Population (2020)
  - Total: 237
  - Density: 104/sq mi (40.3/km^{2})
- Time zone: UTC-8 (PST)
  - Summer (DST): UTC-7 (PDT)
- GNIS feature ID: 2804111

Choctaw Valley is an unincorporated community and census-designated place (CDP) in Kern County, California, United States. It is also the name of neighborhoods in the cities of Bakersfield and Rivergrove. As of the 2020 census, Choctaw Valley had a population of 237.

Choctaw Valley sits mostly on the north bank of the Kern River, or straddles the river until it abuts the Alfred Harrell Hwy.

The area is in the Bakersfield CCD and ZIP Code Tabulation Area 93308.

== Demographics ==
Historical population
Census	Pop.	Note	%±
2020	237		—
U.S. Decennial Census; 1860–1870 1880-1890; 1900 1910 1920; 1930 1940 1950; 1960 1970 1980; 1990 2000 2010; 2020

The CDP of Choctaw Valley was first listed in the 2020 census.

=== 2020 census ===
As of the 2020 census, Choctaw Valley had a population of 237. The median age was 51.8 years. 21.9% of residents were under the age of 18 and 23.2% of residents were 65 years of age or older. For every 100 females there were 102.6 males, and for every 100 females age 18 and over there were 120.2 males age 18 and over.

0.0% of residents lived in urban areas, while 100.0% lived in rural areas.

There were 84 households in Choctaw Valley, of which 27.4% had children under the age of 18 living in them. Of all households, 65.5% were married-couple households, 20.2% were households with a male householder and no spouse or partner present, and 11.9% were households with a female householder and no spouse or partner present. About 20.3% of all households were made up of individuals and 7.2% had someone living alone who was 65 years of age or older.

There were 89 housing units, of which 5.6% were vacant. The homeowner vacancy rate was 3.7% and the rental vacancy rate was 0.0%.

Choctaw Valley CDP, California – Racial and ethnic composition Note: the US Census treats Hispanic/Latino as an ethnic category. This table excludes Latinos from the racial categories and assigns them to a separate category. Hispanics/Latinos may be of any race.
Race / Ethnicity (NH = Non-Hispanic)	Pop 2020	% 2020
White alone (NH)	172	72.57%
Black or African American alone (NH)	1	0.42%
Native American or Alaska Native alone (NH)	3	1.27%
Asian alone (NH)	10	4.22%
Native Hawaiian or Pacific Islander alone (NH)	0	0.00%
Other race alone (NH)	1	0.42%
Mixed race or Multiracial (NH)	10	4.22%
Hispanic or Latino (any race)	40	16.88%
Total	237	100.00%

== 93308 ==
In the larger ZIP Code Tabulation Area that encompasses the area, there was a population of 52,447 at the 2020 census and 54,857 for the 2021 American Community Survey 5-Year estimate.
