= Victor, California =

Victor
- census-designated place
- Position in California.
- Coordinates: 38°08′19″N 121°11′56″W
- Country: United States
- State: California
- County: San Joaquin

Area
  - Total: 1.263 sq mi (3.271 km^{2})
  - Land: 1.263 sq mi (3.271 km^{2})
  - Water: 0 sq mi (0 km^{2}) 0%
- Elevation: 79 ft (24 m)

Population (2020)
  - Total: 313
  - Density: 248/sq mi (95.7/km^{2})
- Time zone: UTC-8 (Pacific (PST))
  - Summer (DST): UTC-7 (PDT)
- ZIP code: 95253
- Area code: 209
- GNIS feature ID: 2583176

Victor is a census-designated place and community in San Joaquin County, California, United States. The population was 313 at the 2020 census, up from 293 at the 2010 census.

The ZIP Code is 95253, and the settlement is inside area code 209.

== Geography ==
According to the United States Census Bureau, the CDP covers an area of 1.3 square miles (3.3 km^{2}), all of it land.

== Demographics ==
Historical population
| Census | Pop. | Note | %± |
|---|---|---|---|
| 2010 | 293 | | — |
| 2020 | 313 | | 6.8% |
U.S. Decennial Census; 1860–1870 1880-1890; 1900 1910 1920; 1930 1940 1950; 1960 1970 1980; 1990 2000 2010

Victor first appeared as a census designated place in the 2010 U.S. census, one of ten CDPS (Acampo, Collierville, Dogtown, Mountain House, Peters, Terminous, Thornton, Victor, Waterloo, and Woodbridge) formed out of the deleted North Woodbridge CDP and South Woodbridge CDP.

The 2020 United States census reported that Victor had a population of 313. The population density was 247.8 inhabitants per square mile (95.7/km^{2}). The racial makeup was 148 (47.3%) White, 0 (0.0%) African American, 5 (1.6%) Native American, 8 (2.6%) Asian, 3 (1.0%) Pacific Islander, 79 (25.2%) from other races, and 70 (22.4%) from two or more races. Hispanic or Latino of any race were 185 persons (59.1%).

The whole population lived in households. There were 118 households, out of which 35 (29.7%) had children under the age of 18 living in them, 71 (60.2%) were married-couple households, 3 (2.5%) were cohabiting couple households, 23 (19.5%) had a female householder with no partner present, and 21 (17.8%) had a male householder with no partner present. 28 households (23.7%) were one person, and 9 (7.6%) were one person aged 65 or older. The average household size was 2.65. There were 87 families (73.7% of all households).

The age distribution was 93 people (29.7%) under the age of 18, 26 people (8.3%) aged 18 to 24, 69 people (22.0%) aged 25 to 44, 84 people (26.8%) aged 45 to 64, and 41 people (13.1%) who were 65 years of age or older. The median age was 39.2 years. For every 100 females, there were 101.9 males.

There were 123 housing units at an average density of 97.4 units per square mile (37.6 units/km^{2}), of which 118 (95.9%) were occupied. Of these, 113 (95.8%) were owner-occupied, and 5 (4.2%) were occupied by renters.

== Politics ==
In the state legislature, Victor is in the 5th senatorial district, represented by Democrat Jerry McNerney, and in the 9th Assembly district, represented by Republican Heath Flora.

Federally, Victor is in California's 9th congressional district, represented by Democrat Josh Harder.
