= North Woodbridge, California =

North Woodbridge
- former census-designated place
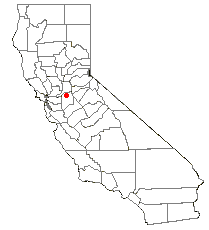
- Location of North Woodbridge, California
- Coordinates: 38°9′37″N 121°18′32″W
- Country: United States
- State: California
- County: San Joaquin

Government
  - Senate: Tom Berryhill (R)
  - Assembly: Alan Nakanishi (R)
  - U. S. Congress: Josh Harder (D)

Area
  - Total: 2.8 sq mi (7.2 km^{2})
  - Land: 2.7 sq mi (7.0 km^{2})
  - Water: 0.12 sq mi (0.3 km^{2})

Population (2000)
  - Total: 1,320
  - Density: 491/sq mi (189.4/km^{2})
- Time zone: UTC-8 (PST)
  - Summer (DST): UTC-7 (PDT)
- ZIP code: 95258
- Area code: 209
- FIPS code: 06-52452

North Woodbridge was a former census-designated place (CDP) in San Joaquin County, California, United States. The population was 1,320 at the 2000 census. For the 2010 census, the CDP's of South Woodbridge and North Woodbridge were merged into Woodbridge.

== Geography ==
North Woodbridge is located at 38°9′37″N 121°18′32″W (38.160369, -121.308981).

According to the United States Census Bureau, the CDP had a total area of 2.8 square miles (7.3 km^{2}), of which, 2.7 square miles (7.0 km^{2}) of it was land and 0.1 square miles (0.26 km^{2}) of it (3.58%) was water.

== Demographics ==
Historical population
Census	Pop.	Note	%±
2000	1,320		—
U.S. Decennial Census; 1860–1870 1880-1890; 1900 1910 1920; 1930 1940 1950; 1960 1970 1980; 1990 2000 2010

North Woodbridge first appeared as a census designated place in the 2000 U.S. census formed along with the South Woodbridge CDP out of the deleted Woodbridge CDP. It was deleted along with the South Woodbridge CDP prior to the 2010 U.S. census to form the Acampo CDP, Collierville CDP, Dogtown CDP, Mountain House CDP, Peters CDP, Terminous CDP, Thornton CDP, Victor CDP, Waterloo CDP, and Woodbridge CDP.

=== 2000 ===
As of the census of 2000, there were 1,320 people, 492 households, and 417 families residing in the CDP. The population density was 490.4 inhabitants per square mile (189.3/km^{2}). There were 498 housing units at an average density of 185.0 per square mile (71.4/km^{2}). The racial makeup of the CDP was 92.05% White, 0.08% African American, 0.76% Native American, 3.11% Asian, 0.08% Pacific Islander, 0.53% from other races, and 3.41% from two or more races. Hispanic or Latino of any race were 6.74% of the population.

There were 492 households, out of which 35.8% had children under the age of 18 living with them, 78.9% were married couples living together, 3.5% had a female householder with no husband present, and 15.2% were non-families. 11.6% of all households were made up of individuals, and 4.3% had someone living alone who was 65 years of age or older. The average household size was 2.68 and the average family size was 2.93.

In the CDP, the population was spread out, with 25.0% under the age of 18, 4.7% from 18 to 24, 22.6% from 25 to 44, 33.6% from 45 to 64, and 14.1% who were 65 years of age or older. The median age was 44 years. For every 100 females, there were 91.3 males. For every 100 females age 18 and over, there were 91.9 males.

The median income for a household in the CDP was $79,417, and the median income for a family was $87,285. Males had a median income of $62,250 versus $50,500 for females. The per capita income for the CDP was $45,693. About 2.8% of families and 3.8% of the population were below the poverty line, including 3.2% of those under age 18 and none of those age 65 or over.
