= Goodmanville, California =

Census-designated place near Bakersfield, US

- Unincorporated community Census-designated place
- Location in California Goodmanville, California (the United States)
- Coordinates: 35°20′37.12″N 118°56′37.39″W
- Country: United States
- State: California
- County: Kern

Area
  - Total: 0.677 sq mi (1.75 km^{2})
  - Land: 0.677 sq mi (1.75 km^{2})
  - Water: 0 sq mi (0 km^{2})
- Elevation: 541 ft (165 m)

Population (2020)
  - Total: 121
  - Density: 179/sq mi (69.0/km^{2})
- Time zone: UTC-8 (Pacific)
  - Summer (DST): UTC-7 (PDT)
- GNIS feature ID: 2804408

Goodmanville is an unincorporated community and census-designated place (CDP) in Kern County, California, United States. Goodmanville is within the Bakersfield's census county division, and is across the Alfred Harrell Highway from the city of Bakersfield. Its population was 121 at the 2020 census.

== Details ==
As listed in the Geographic Names Information System, its elevation is 541 feet.

== Demographics ==
Historical population
Census	Pop.	Note	%±
2020	121		—
U.S. Decennial Census; 1860–1870 1880-1890; 1900 1910 1920; 1930 1940 1950; 1960 1970 1980; 1990 2000 2010; 2020

Goodmanville first appeared as a census designated place in the 2020 U.S. census.

=== 2020 Census ===
Goodmanville CDP, California – Racial and ethnic composition Note: the US Census treats Hispanic/Latino as an ethnic category. This table excludes Latinos from the racial categories and assigns them to a separate category. Hispanics/Latinos may be of any race.
Race / Ethnicity (NH = Non-Hispanic)	Pop 2020	% 2020
White alone (NH)	98	80.99%
Black or African American alone (NH)	1	0.83%
Native American or Alaska Native alone (NH)	1	0.83%
Asian alone (NH)	4	3.31%
Native Hawaiian or Pacific Islander alone (NH)	0	0.00%
Other race alone (NH)	0	0.00%
Mixed race or Multiracial (NH)	3	2.48%
Hispanic or Latino (any race)	14	11.57%
Total	121	100.00%
