= Lakeside, Kern County, California =

Lakeside, California
- Unincorporated community Census designated place
- Location within California
- Coordinates: 35°14′4.80″N 119°4′58.29″W
- Country: United States
- State: California
- County: Kern

Area
  - Total: 1.805 sq mi (4.67 km^{2})
  - Land: 1.805 sq mi (4.67 km^{2})
  - Water: 0 sq mi (0 km^{2})
- Elevation: 331 ft (101 m)

Population (2020)
  - Total: 843
  - Density: 467/sq mi (180/km^{2})
- Time zone: UTC-8 (PST)
  - Summer (DST): UTC-7 (PDT)
- GNIS feature ID: 2804421

Lakeside is an unincorporated community and census designated place (CDP) in Kern County, California, United States. Per the 2020 census, the population was 843.

== Demographics ==
Historical population
Census	Pop.	Note	%±
2020	843		—
U.S. Decennial Census; 1860–1870 1880-1890; 1900 1910 1920; 1930 1940 1950; 1960 1970 1980; 1990 2000 2010; 2020

Lakeside first appeared as a census designated place in the 2020 U.S. census.

=== 2020 Census ===
Lakeside CDP (Kern County), California – Racial and ethnic composition Note: the US Census treats Hispanic/Latino as an ethnic category. This table excludes Latinos from the racial categories and assigns them to a separate category. Hispanics/Latinos may be of any race.
Race / Ethnicity (NH = Non-Hispanic)	Pop 2020	% 2020
White alone (NH)	527	62.51%
Black or African American alone (NH)	24	2.85%
Native American or Alaska Native alone (NH)	0	0.00%
Asian alone (NH)	10	1.19%
Native Hawaiian or Pacific Islander alone (NH)	3	0.36%
Other race alone (NH)	6	0.71%
Mixed race or Multiracial (NH)	32	3.80%
Hispanic or Latino (any race)	241	28.59%
Total	843	100.00%
