= El Monte Mobile Village, California =

El Monte Mobile Village
- Unincorporated community Census-designated place
- Location within California Location within the United States
- Coordinates: 36°32′49″N 119°25′30″W
- Country: United States
- State: California
- County: Tulare

Area
  - Total: 0.0077 sq mi (0.02 km^{2})
  - Land: 0.0077 sq mi (0.02 km^{2})
  - Water: 0 sq mi (0.0 km^{2})
- Elevation: 330 ft (100 m)

Population (2020)
  - Total: 156
- Time zone: UTC-8 (Pacific (PST))
  - Summer (DST): UTC-7 (PDT)
- ZIP Code: 93618 (Dinuba)
- Area code: 559
- FIPS code: 06-22235
- GNIS feature ID: 2805242

El Monte Mobile Village is an unincorporated community and census-designated place (CDP) comprising three census blocks in Tulare County, California, United States. It is on the north side of Avenue 416, 0.4 miles (0.64 km) west of the Dinuba city limits. The village was first listed as a CDP prior to the 2020 census. As of the 2020 census, El Monte Mobile Village had a population of 156.

== Demographics ==
Historical population
Census	Pop.	Note	%±
2020	156		—
U.S. Decennial Census; 1850–1870 1880-1890; 1900 1910 1920; 1930 1940 1950; 1960 1970 1980; 1990 2000 2010; 2020

El Monte Mobile Village first appeared as a census designated place in the 2020 U.S. census.

=== 2020 Census ===
El Monte Mobile Village CDP, California – Racial and ethnic composition Note: the US Census treats Hispanic/Latino as an ethnic category. This table excludes Latinos from the racial categories and assigns them to a separate category. Hispanics/Latinos may be of any race.
Race / Ethnicity (NH = Non-Hispanic)	Pop 2020	% 2020
White alone (NH)	5	3.21%
Black or African American alone (NH)	0	0.00%
Native American or Alaska Native alone (NH)	0	0.00%
Asian alone (NH)	1	0.64%
Pacific Islander alone (NH)	0	0.00%
Other race alone (NH)	0	0.00%
Mixed race or Multiracial (NH)	2	1.28%
Hispanic or Latino (any race)	148	94.87%
Total	156	100.00%

== Education ==
The CDP is served by the Dinuba Unified School District.
