= Collierville, California =

Collierville
- census-designated place
- Location of Collierville in San Joaquin County, California.

- Position in California.
- Coordinates: 38°12′47″N 121°15′54″W
- Country: United States
- State: California
- County: San Joaquin

Area
  - Total: 6.61 sq mi (17.11 km^{2})
  - Land: 6.59 sq mi (17.08 km^{2})
  - Water: 0.012 sq mi (0.03 km^{2}) 0.15%
- Elevation: 62 ft (19 m)

Population (2020)
  - Total: 2,094
  - Density: 317.5/sq mi (122.59/km^{2})
- Time zone: UTC-8 (Pacific (PST))
  - Summer (DST): UTC-7 (PDT)
- GNIS feature ID: 2582980

Collierville is a census-designated place in San Joaquin County, California. Collierville sits at an elevation of 62 feet (19 m). The 2020 United States census reported Collierville's population was 2,094.

== Geography ==
According to the United States Census Bureau, the CDP covers an area of 6.6 square miles (17.1 km^{2}), 99.85% of it land, and 0.15% of it water.

== Demographics ==
Historical population
Census	Pop.	Note	%±
2010	1,934		—
2020	2,094		8.3%
U.S. Decennial Census; 1860–1870 1880-1890; 1900 1910 1920; 1930 1940 1950; 1960 1970 1980; 1990 2000 2010

Collierville first appeared as a census designated place in the 2010 U.S. census.

=== 2020 census ===
As of the 2020 census, Collierville had a population of 2,094 and a population density of 317.5 inhabitants per square mile (122.6/km^{2}). The median age was 40.5 years. 23.3% of residents were under the age of 18, 9.8% were aged 18 to 24, 22.7% were aged 25 to 44, 26.6% were aged 45 to 64, and 17.5% were 65 years of age or older. For every 100 females there were 104.9 males, and for every 100 females age 18 and over there were 102.6 males age 18 and over.

65.7% of residents lived in urban areas, while 34.3% lived in rural areas.

The whole population lived in households. There were 699 households, of which 32.6% had children under the age of 18 living in them. Of all households, 63.5% were married-couple households, 6.4% were cohabiting couple households, 14.2% were households with a male householder and no spouse or partner present, and 15.9% were households with a female householder and no spouse or partner present. About 14.2% of all households were made up of individuals and 9.8% had someone living alone who was 65 years of age or older. The average household size was 3.0. There were 550 families (78.7% of all households).

There were 728 housing units at an average density of 110.4 units per square mile (42.6 units/km^{2}), of which 699 (96.0%) were occupied. Of occupied units, 71.4% were owner-occupied and 28.6% were occupied by renters. Of all housing units, 4.0% were vacant. The homeowner vacancy rate was 0.6% and the rental vacancy rate was 1.0%.

Racial composition as of the 2020 census
Race	Number	Percent
White	1,216	58.1%
Black or African American	17	0.8%
American Indian and Alaska Native	19	0.9%
Asian	81	3.9%
Native Hawaiian and Other Pacific Islander	10	0.5%
Some other race	441	21.1%
Two or more races	310	14.8%

=== 2010 census ===
Collierville first appeared as a census designated place in the 2010 U.S. census, one of ten CDPs (Acampo, Collierville, Dogtown, Mountain House, Peters, Terminous, Thornton, Victor, Waterloo, and Woodbridge) formed out of the deleted North Woodbridge CDP and South Woodbridge CDP.

== Climate ==
According to the Köppen Climate Classification system, Collierville has a warm-summer Mediterranean climate, abbreviated "Csa" on climate maps.
