= Tancred, California =

- Unincorporated community Census-designated place
- Location in California Tancred, California (the United States)
- Coordinates: 38°45′43″N 122°09′17″W
- Country: United States
- State: California
- County: Yolo

Area
  - Total: 1.611 sq mi (4.17 km^{2})
  - Land: 1.611 sq mi (4.17 km^{2})
  - Water: 0 sq mi (0 km^{2})
- Elevation: 289 ft (88 m)

Population (2020)
  - Total: 89
  - Density: 55/sq mi (21/km^{2})
- Time zone: UTC-8 (Pacific)
  - Summer (DST): UTC-7 (PDT)
- GNIS feature ID: 2805253

Tancred is an unincorporated community and census-designated place (CDP) in Yolo County, California, United States. As of the 2020 census, Tancred had a population of 89. It lies at an elevation of 299 feet (91 m).

== History ==
The community of Tancred, named for Prince Tancred of Galilee, was formed by the Western Cooperative Colonization and Improvement Company. The company enabled over 40 urban families to relocate to the area and acquire over 800 acres (3.2 km^{2}) of land. These families shared their resources in farming as well as constructing community areas such as a nursery and park. A post office in the town was open between 1892 and 1932. A frost in 1896 killed many of the fruit trees in the area, which led the company into bankruptcy and many of the coop farmers to lose their land. Future land owners were able to find grain and nuts to grow in this colder part of the county, but the community hasn't grown much since its inception.

== Demographics ==
Historical population
Census	Pop.	Note	%±
2020	89		—
U.S. Decennial Census; 1850–1870 1880-1890; 1900 1910 1920; 1930 1940 1950; 1960 1970 1980; 1990 2000 2010; 2020

Tancred first appeared as a census designated place in the 2020 U.S. census.

=== 2020 Census ===
Tancred CDP, California – Racial and ethnic composition Note: the US Census treats Hispanic/Latino as an ethnic category. This table excludes Latinos from the racial categories and assigns them to a separate category. Hispanics/Latinos may be of any race.
Race / Ethnicity (NH = Non-Hispanic)	Pop 2020	% 2020
White alone (NH)	42	47.19%
Black or African American alone (NH)	0	0.00%
Native American or Alaska Native alone (NH)	0	0.00%
Asian alone (NH)	0	0.00%
Pacific Islander alone (NH)	0	0.00%
Other race alone (NH)	0	0.00%
Mixed race or Multiracial (NH)	11	12.36%
Hispanic or Latino (any race)	36	40.45%
Total	89	100.00%

== Education ==
The CDP is served by the Esparto Unified School District.
