= Hypericum, California =

- Unincorporated community Census-designated place
- Location within California Location within the United States
- Coordinates: 36°15′22″N 119°13′0″W
- Country: United States
- State: California
- County: Tulare

Area
  - Total: 0.031 sq mi (0.08 km^{2})
  - Land: 0.031 sq mi (0.08 km^{2})
  - Water: 0 sq mi (0.0 km^{2})
- Elevation: 339 ft (103 m)

Population (2020)
  - Total: 125
- Time zone: UTC-8 (Pacific (PST))
  - Summer (DST): UTC-7 (PDT)
- ZIP Code: 93292 (Visalia)
- Area code: 559
- FIPS code: 06-36135
- GNIS feature ID: 2805906

Hypericum is an unincorporated community and census-designated place (CDP) in Tulare County, California, United States. It is on the north side of Avenue 256, 9 miles (14 km) southeast of Visalia, the county seat.

As of the 2020 census, Hypericum had a population of 125.

== Demographics ==
Historical population
| Census | Pop. | Note | %± |
|---|---|---|---|
| 2020 | 125 | | — |
U.S. Decennial Census; 1850–1870 1880-1890; 1900 1910 1920; 1930 1940 1950; 1960 1970 1980; 1990 2000 2010 2020

Hypericum first appeared as a census designated place in the 2020 U.S. census.

=== 2020 Census ===
Hypericum CDP, California – Racial and ethnic composition Note: the US Census treats Hispanic/Latino as an ethnic category. This table excludes Latinos from the racial categories and assigns them to a separate category. Hispanics/Latinos may be of any race.
| Race / Ethnicity (NH = Non-Hispanic) | Pop 2020 | % 2020 |
|---|---|---|
| White alone (NH) | 17 | 13.60% |
| Black or African American alone (NH) | 0 | 0.00% |
| Native American or Alaska Native alone (NH) | 0 | 0.00% |
| Asian alone (NH) | 0 | 0.00% |
| Pacific Islander alone (NH) | 0 | 0.00% |
| Other race alone (NH) | 0 | 0.00% |
| Mixed race or Multiracial (NH) | 1 | 0.80% |
| Hispanic or Latino (any race) | 107 | 85.60% |
| Total | 125 | 100.00% |

== Education ==
The CDP is served by the Outside Creek Elementary School District and by the Exeter Unified School District for grades 9-12.
