= Rivergrove, California =

- Unincorporated community Census-designated place
- Location in California Rivergrove, California (the United States)
- Coordinates: 35°26′25.06″N 118°56′27.90″W
- Country: United States
- State: California
- County: Kern

Area
  - Total: 0.658 sq mi (1.70 km^{2})
  - Land: 0.658 sq mi (1.70 km^{2})
  - Water: 0 sq mi (0 km^{2})
- Elevation: 512 ft (156 m)

Population (2020)
  - Total: 195
  - Density: 296/sq mi (114/km^{2})
- Time zone: UTC-8 (Pacific)
  - Summer (DST): UTC-7 (PDT)
- GNIS feature ID: 2804430

Rivergrove is a census-designated place (CDP) in Kern County, California, United States. As of the 2020 census, Rivergrove had a population of 195.

Although it is designated by the census as its own place, it is functionally a neighborhood of Bakersfield.

== Geography ==
Rivergrove sits at an elevation of 512 feet (156 m). Rivergrove borders Goodmanville to the south and east across the Kern River.

== Demographics ==
Historical population
Census	Pop.	Note	%±
2020	195		—
U.S. Decennial Census; 1860–1870 1880-1890; 1900 1910 1920; 1930 1940 1950; 1960 1970 1980; 1990 2000 2010; 2020

The CDP was first listed in the 2020 census, at which it had 195 people in 74 households.

=== 2020 Census ===
Rivergrove CDP, California – Racial and ethnic composition Note: the US Census treats Hispanic/Latino as an ethnic category. This table excludes Latinos from the racial categories and assigns them to a separate category. Hispanics/Latinos may be of any race.
Race / Ethnicity (NH = Non-Hispanic)	Pop 2020	% 2020
White alone (NH)	143	73.33%
Black or African American alone (NH)	0	0.00%
Native American or Alaska Native alone (NH)	10	5.13%
Asian alone (NH)	2	1.03%
Native Hawaiian or Pacific Islander alone (NH)	0	0.00%
Other race alone (NH)	0	0.00%
Mixed race or Multiracial (NH)	15	7.69%
Hispanic or Latino (any race)	25	12.82%
Total	195	100.00%
