= South Woodbridge, California =

Unincorporated community in California, United States

South Woodbridge
- former census-designated place
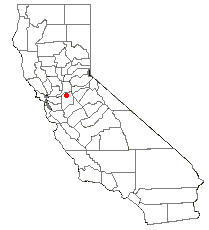
- Location of South Woodbridge, California
- Coordinates: 38°9′15″N 121°18′22″W
- Country: United States
- State: California
- County: San Joaquin

Government
  - Senate: Tom Berryhill (R)
  - Assembly: Alan Nakanishi (R)
  - U. S. Congress: Josh Harder (D)

Area
  - Total: 0.39 sq mi (1.0 km^{2})
  - Land: 0.39 sq mi (1.0 km^{2})
  - Water: 0 sq mi (0.0 km^{2})

Population (2000)
  - Total: 2,825
  - Density: 7,675/sq mi (2,963.4/km^{2})
- Time zone: UTC-8 (PST)
  - Summer (DST): UTC-7 (PDT)
- ZIP code: 95258
- Area code: 209
- FIPS code: 06-73461

South Woodbridge was a former census-designated place (CDP) in San Joaquin County, California, United States. The population was 2,825 at the 2000 census. For the 2010 census, the CDP's of South Woodbridge and North Woodbridge were merged into Woodbridge.

== Geography ==
South Woodbridge is located at 38°9′15″N 121°18′22″W (38.154118, -121.306008).

According to the United States Census Bureau, the CDP had a total area of 0.4 square miles (1.0 km^{2}), of which, 0.4 square miles (1.0 km^{2}) of it was land and 2.63% was water.

== Demographics ==
Historical population
Census	Pop.	Note	%±
2000	2,825		—
U.S. Decennial Census; 1860–1870 1880-1890; 1900 1910 1920; 1930 1940 1950; 1960 1970 1980; 1990 2000 2010

South Woodbridge first appeared as a census designated place in the 2000 U.S. census formed along with the North Woodbridge CDP out of the deleted Woodbridge CDP. It was deleted along with the North Woodbridge CDP prior to the 2010 U.S. census to form the Acampo, Collierville, Dogtown, Mountain House, Peters, Terminous, Thornton, Victor, Waterloo, and Woodbridge CDPs.

=== 2000 ===
As of the census of 2000, there were 2,825 people, 891 households, and 733 families residing in the CDP. The population density was 7,675.2 inhabitants per square mile (2,963.4/km^{2}). There were 914 housing units at an average density of 2,483.2 per square mile (958.8/km^{2}). The racial makeup of the CDP was 76.21% White, 0.14% African American, 0.99% Native American, 4.85% Asian, 0.04% Pacific Islander, 13.73% from other races, and 4.04% from two or more races. Hispanic or Latino of any race were 27.40% of the population.

There were 891 households, out of which 47.9% had children under the age of 18 living with them, 64.4% were married couples living together, 12.9% had a female householder with no husband present, and 17.7% were non-families. 13.8% of all households were made up of individuals, and 3.9% had someone living alone who was 65 years of age or older. The average household size was 3.15 and the average family size was 3.46.

In the CDP, the population was spread out, with 33.5% under the age of 18, 7.5% from 18 to 24, 29.6% from 25 to 44, 22.1% from 45 to 64, and 7.3% who were 65 years of age or older. The median age was 33 years. For every 100 females, there were 103.8 males. For every 100 females age 18 and over, there were 98.3 males.

The median income for a household in the CDP was $48,476, and the median income for a family was $51,810. Males had a median income of $40,427 versus $31,354 for females. The per capita income for the CDP was $19,067. About 4.5% of families and 7.1% of the population were below the poverty line, including 11.5% of those under age 18 and none of those age 65 or over.
