= Upper North Fork Feather River Project =

Hydroelectric power project in California

Coordinates: 40.1725°N 121.1432°W

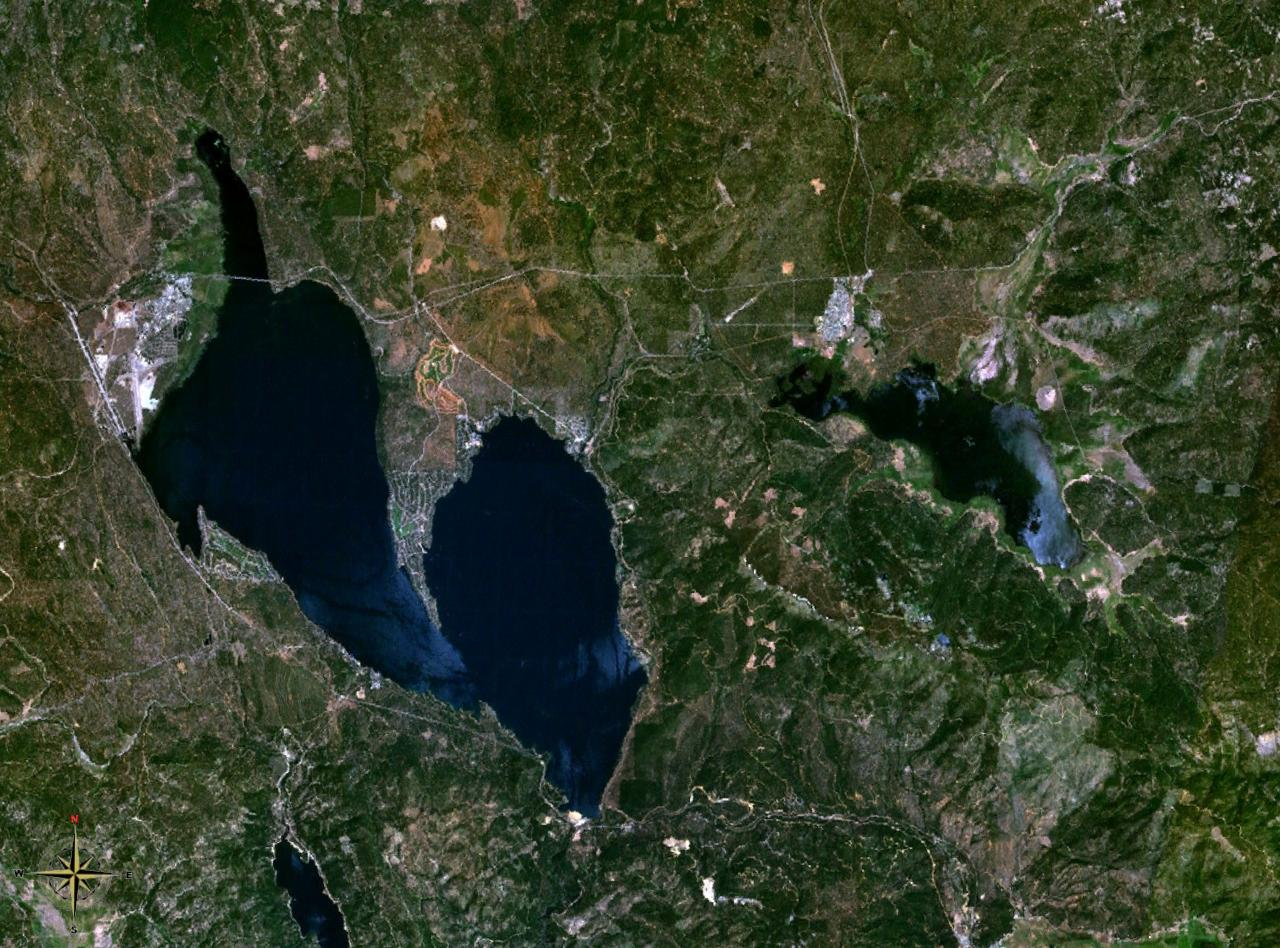
Satellite view of Lake Almanor (center left); Butt Valley Reservoir is partly visible at bottom left. The large body of water at right is Mountain Meadows Reservoir, part of PG&E's separate Hamilton Branch Project.

The Upper North Fork Feather River Project is a hydroelectric scheme in the Sierra Nevada of California, within Lassen and Plumas Counties. The project consists of three dams, five power plants, and multiple conduits and tunnels in the headwaters of the North Fork Feather River, a major tributary of the Feather—Sacramento River systems. The total installed capacity is 362.3 megawatts (MW), producing an annual average of 1,171.9 gigawatt hours (GWh). The project is also contracted for the delivery of irrigation water between March 31 and October 31 of each year. The project is owned and operated by Pacific Gas and Electric Company.

The project is one of several on the North Fork and its tributaries, forming a hydroelectric system so extensive it has been dubbed the "Stairway of Power".

== Background ==
The project was conceived in the early 1900s under the Great Western Power Company to provide hydroelectricity and water storage for irrigation in the Sacramento Valley. In 1908, the Big Bend or Las Plumas powerhouse was completed on the North Fork southeast of Paradise, generating 40 MW (later uprated to 70 MW) of hydroelectricity, which was sent as far away as Oakland, 154 miles (248 km) away. The power station replaced an earlier 1880 plant built by the Big Bend Tunnel and Mining Company for gold mining operations in the area which ultimately were unprofitable. In 1910, the Big Bend Dam, first permanent dam on the Feather River, was completed to increase the hydraulic head available to the powerhouse.

During the early years of the project, few roads existed in this rugged section of the Sierra, so construction supplies were delivered via the Western Pacific Railroad, which was also under construction at the time. At its completion, the Big Bend power plant had the largest turbines, transformers and penstocks of any hydroelectric plant in the world. However, year-round generation at the plant was an impossibility due to seasonal fluctuations in the flow of the river.

A large storage reservoir was first proposed to be built at Big Meadows, about 40 miles (64 km) upstream from Big Bend, by engineer Julius M. Howells. Great Western Power Company began to buy land in the valley for the future reservoir, but encountered bitter local opposition. The small town of Prattville in Big Meadows was burned to the ground July 4, 1909; arson was suspected, but has never been proven.

Construction of the Canyon Dam to impound Lake Almanor at Big Meadows began in 1910. A rough one-way road was blazed from Greenville in the same year to transport workers and construction materials to the site, where a company town called Canyondam was established. Although originally conceived as a multiple-arch dam by its designers John S. Eastwood and H.H. Sinclair, concerns over the safety of this relatively new construction technique led to a change in the design. In March 1913, with over 40 percent of the dam completed, a state commission declared the structure unsafe. The partly completed dam was dynamited and a new earthfill structure, containing over 250,000 cubic yards (190,000 m^{3}) of material, was built. The reservoir's name is a combination of the names of the daughters of Guy C. Earl, the vice president of Great Western.

The construction of this reservoir, which at the time, had a capacity of 220,000 acre-feet (270,000,000 m^{3}), ensured a steady water supply for the powerhouse and for irrigation during the summer. A Great Western Power Company subsidiary, the Western Canal Company, would manage the distribution of water to farmers on the lower Feather River near Oroville in Butte County. Between 1919 and 1921, the first Caribou Powerhouse was built on the tributary Butt Creek, and a tunnel was excavated from Lake Almanor to the creek to provide water for the powerhouse. A high dam on Butt Creek was built in 1924 to increase the total water storage and power capacity. Between 1925 and 1927, the Canyon Dam was expanded, increasing Lake Almanor's capacity to 880,000 acre-feet (1.09 km^{3}).

In 1930, Pacific Gas and Electric Company (PG&E) acquired the Great Western Power Company and the Upper North Fork Project. However, the Western Canal Company (now known as the Western Canal Water District) continued to hold water rights to Lake Almanor and other PG&E reservoirs along the Feather River, ensuring the continuation of irrigation deliveries. The third project dam, Belden Forebay, was built on the North Fork in 1958 to serve as an afterbay for the Caribou powerplant. The Caribou No. 2 powerplant was also built in 1958 to increase the total project generating capacity. In 1962, the Canyon Dam was raised again, enlarging the lake to its present capacity of 1,308,000 acre-feet (1.613×10^{9} m^{3}).

Six years later, in 1968, the giant Oroville Dam was completed on the Feather River as part of the California State Water Project, forming Lake Oroville, which flooded out most of the lower North Fork, including Big Bend Powerhouse and the Big Bend Dam. PG&E completed the Belden Powerhouse in 1969 to replace the lost capacity.

The last component of the project, Oak Flat Powerhouse, was built in 1985 to generate power from fishery releases, as federal law requires a minimum flow to be maintained in the otherwise dewatered river stretches between the dams.

== Infrastructure ==
=== Canyon Dam, Lake Almanor, and Butt Valley Powerhouse ===
Located southeast of Chester, Lake Almanor, formed by the 130-foot (40 m) high, 1,250-foot (380 m) long earthfill Canyon Dam (also known as Almanor Dam), is the primary storage facility for the project, with a capacity of 1,308,000 acre-feet (1.613 km^{3}) of water. At 28,160 acres (11,400 ha), Almanor is one of California's largest artificial lakes by surface area. The dam and reservoir control runoff from a watershed of 503 square miles (1,300 km^{2}), whose headwaters lie in Lassen Volcanic National Park to the northwest.

Water from Lake Almanor is diverted southwest through the short Prattville Tunnel to Butt Valley Powerhouse, completed in 1958. The powerhouse is located on Butt Creek just above Butt Valley Reservoir. The 41 MW powerhouse has a gross hydraulic head of 362 feet (110 m) and a maximum flow capacity of 2,118 cubic feet per second (60.0 m^{3}/s). The powerhouse generates about 156.1 GWh per year.

=== Butt Valley Dam and the Caribou Powerhouses ===
The dam on Butt Creek, a tributary of the North Fork Feather River located south of Lake Almanor, was completed in 1924. The 84-foot (26 m) high, 1,370-foot (420 m) long dam forms a reservoir of 49,891-acre-foot (0.061540 km^{3}) which serves as an afterbay for the Butt Valley Powerhouse. Water from Butt Creek as well as North Fork water diverted through the Butt Valley Powerhouse is fed through tunnels from Butt Valley Reservoir to two powerhouses on the North Fork near Caribou.

The 75 MW Caribou No. 1 powerhouse, completed in 1921, has an average head of 1,150 feet (350 m) and a flow capacity of 1,114 cubic feet per second (31.5 m^{3}/s), generating 171.4 GWh annually. The larger Caribou No. 2 powerhouse, completed in 1958, has a capacity of 120 MW, with the same hydraulic head as No. 1 but a larger flow capacity, 1,464 cubic feet per second (41.5 m^{3}/s). The plant generates 442.2 GWh per year.

Because Caribou No. 2 has more efficient, newer turbines than No. 1, it is run throughout the year while No. 1 is now only operated in times of higher demand or when service is required at No. 2.

=== Belden Dam and Belden Powerhouse ===
Belden Dam (also known as Caribou Afterbay Dam) is a small earthfill diversion dam located on the North Fork Feather River, about 6 miles (9.7 km) downstream from Canyon Dam. Completed in 1958, the dam is 84 feet (26 m) high and 400 feet (120 m) long, with a storage capacity of 2,477 acre-feet (3,055,000 m^{3}). The dam and reservoir serve as an afterbay for the Caribou 1 and 2 powerhouses and operate as a run-of-the-river facility, meaning that inflows from the powerhouses and the North Fork must be passed downstream at approximately the same rate.

Oak Flat Powerhouse is located at Belden Dam and generates power from water released into the North Fork for fish and wildlife conservation purposes, as the river would otherwise be dry because of the diversion to Belden Powerhouse. Completed in 1985, the 1.3 MW plant generates about 6.7 GWh per year from a maximum flow of 140 cubic feet per second (4.0 m^{3}/s).

Most of the water, however, is diverted through a 5-mile (8.0 km) long tunnel to the Belden Powerhouse, which is located on Rock Creek Reservoir, another small reservoir on the North Fork. Rock Creek Reservoir is not part of the Upper North Fork project, but rather part of PG&E's separate Rock Creek-Cresta Hydroelectric Project. The 125 MW Belden Powerhouse, completed in 1969, has an average head of 770 feet (230 m) and a flow capacity of 2,410 cu ft/s (68 m^{3}/s). The plant generates about 395.5 GWh per year.

== See also ==
- Poe Dam
- Brighton Substation
