= Canyon Dam =

The term Canyon Dam may refer to the following:

== Dams ==
- Canyon Dam (Sri Lanka), a dam in Sri Lanka.
- Canyon Dam (California), a dam in the U.S. State of California.
- Canyon Dam (Texas), a dam in the U.S. State of Texas.

== Places ==
- Canyondam, California, a community in the U.S. State of California.
