= Forest Ranch, California =

- Unincorporated community
- Location of Forest Ranch in Butte County, California.

- Location in California
- Coordinates: 39°52′56″N 121°40′22″W
- Country: United States
- State: California
- County: Butte

Area
  - Total: 13.934 sq mi (36.090 km^{2})
  - Land: 13.934 sq mi (36.090 km^{2})
  - Water: 0 sq mi (0 km^{2}) 0%
- Elevation: 2,415 ft (736 m)

Population (2020)
  - Total: 1,304
  - Density: 93.58/sq mi (36.13/km^{2})
- Time zone: UTC-8 (Pacific (PST))
  - Summer (DST): UTC-7 (PDT)
- ZIP Code: 95942
- Area codes: 530, 837
- GNIS feature IDs: 260256; 2612481

Forest Ranch is an unincorporated community and census-designated place in Butte County, California, United States. It includes Forest Ranch Charter School (K-8), its own post office, and a CDF and Volunteer fire stations. The community's ZIP code is 95942, and is shared with the community of Butte Meadows. The area code is 530. Forest Ranch's population was 1,304 at the 2020 census.

In late July 2024, the community was affected by the Park Fire. Several structures were destroyed, but the majority of the community was left standing.

The US Geological Survey reports the town's elevation as 2,415 feet (736 m) above mean sea level. The eastern end of the community is about 3,500 feet (1,067 m): about 1,000 feet (305 m) higher. This is high enough that residents occasionally get "snowed in." Residents east of the center of the community report the snowfall is heavy enough to prevent driving about one to three days each year. This is only true of homes not located along State Route 32. Some residents commute to work in Chico, about fifteen driving miles west on SR32.

== History ==
Forest Ranch post office was opened in 1878, closed in 1926, and re-established in 1932, and moved several times in 1938 to its present location. The town once was the site of a lumber mill, established around 1873 and operated by Elias Findley. In the mid-1870s, Findley's residence was taken over by a Mr. and Mrs. Weld, who provided accommodations for teams and travelers on the Humboldt Wagon Road. In the 1890s, Forest Ranch had an active literary society and its school hosted regular performances and athletic events for the general community. The town is now mostly a bedroom community for nearby Chico.

== Demographics ==
Historical population
Census	Pop.	Note	%±
2010	1,184		—
2020	1,304		10.1%
U.S. Decennial Census; 2010

=== 2020 census ===
As of the 2020 census, Forest Ranch had a population of 1,304 and a population density of 93.6 inhabitants per square mile (36.1/km^{2}). 0.0% of residents lived in urban areas, while 100.0% lived in rural areas.

The whole population lived in households. There were 555 households, out of which 127 (22.9%) had children under the age of 18 living in them. Of all households, 301 (54.2%) were married-couple households, 48 (8.6%) were cohabiting couple households, 131 (23.6%) were households with a male householder and no spouse or partner present, and 75 (13.5%) were households with a female householder and no spouse or partner present. About 150 households (27.0%) were made up of individuals and 83 (14.9%) had someone living alone who was 65 years of age or older. The average household size was 2.35, and there were 367 families (66.1% of all households).

The age distribution was 238 people (18.3%) under the age of 18, 45 people (3.5%) aged 18 to 24, 279 people (21.4%) aged 25 to 44, 392 people (30.1%) aged 45 to 64, and 350 people (26.8%) who were 65 years of age or older. The median age was 51.8 years. For every 100 females, there were 112.4 males, and for every 100 females age 18 and over there were 115.4 males age 18 and over.

There were 601 housing units at an average density of 43.1 units per square mile (16.6 units/km^{2}), of which 555 (92.3%) were occupied. Of these, 499 (89.9%) were owner-occupied and 56 (10.1%) were occupied by renters. 7.7% of housing units were vacant. The homeowner vacancy rate was 1.8% and the rental vacancy rate was 1.7%.

Racial composition as of the 2020 census
Race	Number	Percent
White	1,085	83.2%
Black or African American	12	0.9%
American Indian and Alaska Native	12	0.9%
Asian	16	1.2%
Native Hawaiian and Other Pacific Islander	1	0.1%
Some other race	33	2.5%
Two or more races	145	11.1%
Hispanic or Latino (of any race)	108	8.3%

=== 2010 census ===
Forest Ranch first appeared as a census designated place in the 2010 U.S. census.

== Education ==
The CDP is served by the Chico Unified School District.
