= Lomo, Butte County, California =

Unincorporated community in California, United States

Lomo
- Unincorporated community
- Location in California Lomo (the United States)
- Coordinates: 40°02′19″N 121°36′58″W
- Country: United States
- State: California
- County: Butte
- Elevation: 3,780 ft (1,152 m)

Lomo (Spanish for 'Hill') is an unincorporated community in Butte County, California, United States. It lies 4.5 miles (7.2 km) southwest of Butte Meadows, at an elevation of 3779 feet (1152 m).

== History ==
A post office operated at Lomo from 1878 to 1881. It was previously known as Wakefields Station, for Henry Wakefield, who established a homestead on the site in 1864 and provided accommodations for teams and stages on the Humboldt Wagon Road.

Lomo once had a lumber mill, a school, and a hotel. The hotel burned down in 1882 and again in 1885. Today, Lomo is little more than an intersection, with "a few occupied dwellings" in the surrounding forest.
