= Montreal Bar =

Montreal Bar may refer to:

- Bar of Montreal, group of lawyers
- Montreal Bar, former name of Big Bar, Butte County, California
