= Humboldt Wagon Road =

Historical wagon road in California

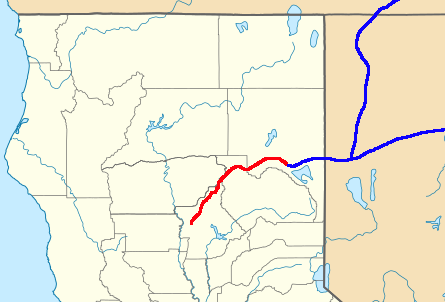
Approximate routes of the Humboldt Wagon Road (red) in California, and connecting roads to Silver City, Idaho and Star City, Nevada (blue)

The Humboldt Wagon Road, or the Humboldt Road, was a freight wagon road in northern California. Constructed in the 1860s, it connected Chico, near the Sacramento River, with Susanville, near Honey Lake, east of the Sierra Nevada crest. From there, extensions continued to the Humboldt silver mines in Nevada and the Owyhee Mines near Silver City, Idaho. The road was surveyed and financed by prominent settler John Bidwell and carried passengers, mail, and freight between logging and ranching communities of northeastern California. It also contributed to the settlement of the region and the displacement of the native Maidu population. Portions of the Humboldt Road are now followed by California State Route 32 and California State Route 36.

== Route description ==
The Humboldt Road began in Chico at a site called The Junction, at the present-day intersection of 9th and Main Streets. It followed Little Chico Creek eastward, then climbed into the Sierra Nevada foothills along the ridge separating the Big and Little Chico Creek drainages. It ascended the mountains, passing through the communities of Forest Ranch, Lomo, Butte Meadows, and Jonesville, then crested the "Big Summit” at 6,600 feet (2,012 m) elevation near the Butte-Plumas County line. It then merged with the Humbug Stagecoach Road from Oroville and descended to Prattville, at the Big Meadows (now Lake Almanor). From there it proceeded eastward over rolling, forested terrain, crossing into the Great Basin at Fredonyer Pass, and into Susanville. At Susanville, the road connected with an existing road extending eastward into Nevada, from which it was possible to head northward to the Idaho Territory along the Idaho Stage Company's road to Ruby City.

The road got its name from the mining district in Humboldt County, Nevada, a source of much of its early traffic. Between 1865 and 1867, it passed through portions of Butte, Tehama, Plumas, and Lassen counties.

== Early history ==
In the early 1860s, deposits of silver were discovered in the Humboldt Range of Nevada and in southwest Idaho. The transit of workers and supplies between these mining districts and California was difficult, due to isolation and the lack of wagon roads and railroads: To reach California, freight either had to be hauled over the dangerous and often snowed-in passes of the high Sierra Nevada, or shipped northward by a circuitous route down the Snake and Columbia Rivers, to the Pacific Ocean and down the coast to San Francisco.

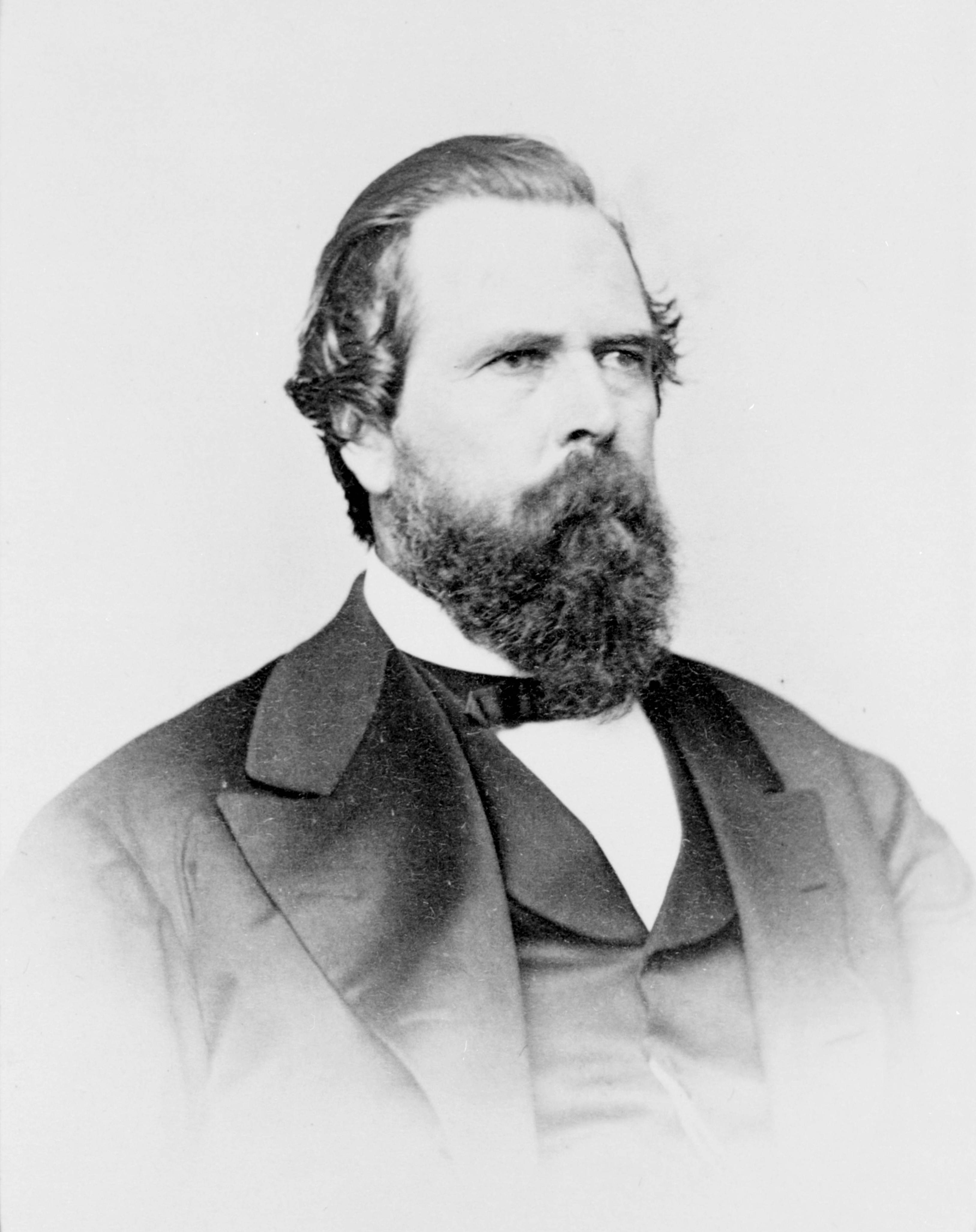
John Bidwell in 1866

Almost due west of the Humboldt Mines lay the city of Chico, California, which had easy access to steamboat shipping on the Sacramento River. Chico's founder, California Representative John Bidwell, recognized that his city could function as a hub for freight traffic to and from the mines, if a road could be built directly eastward to Nevada. Already wealthy from successful ventures in gold mining and logging, Bidwell aligned with other California financiers and put forth some $40,000 to construct the road, and in 1863 received a franchise to operate the highway as a toll road; the group incorporated the following year as the Chico and Humboldt Wagon Road Company. Construction on the road used white, Maidu, and Chinese laborers, who generally earned around $1 per day of work. Construction was complete by late 1864. The first tollbooth was about 14 miles (23 km) east of Chico, near modern Forest Ranch, and charged $1 for a single horseman, $2 for a one-horse buggy, and $1 for each additional horse; the toll was later decreased to $0.75 for a two-horse wagon.

The mining boom proved short-lived, but passenger traffic via stagecoach quickly became popular on the Humboldt Road. Early attempts at stagecoach travel proved slow and dangerous, but in 1866 the newly-formed Chico and Idaho Stage and Fast Freight Company established rapid service, and by late 1866, stagecoaches could make the 400-mile (644 km) trip from Chico to Ruby City in under four days, if weather was favorable—albeit at the steep fare of $60 per passenger (equivalent to $1,350 in 2024). The establishment of way stations for coach lines encouraged settlement in once-remote portions of California. This increased settlement put growing pressure on the native Maidu and Yana, whose numbers were plummeting due to disease and direct persecution by white settlers.

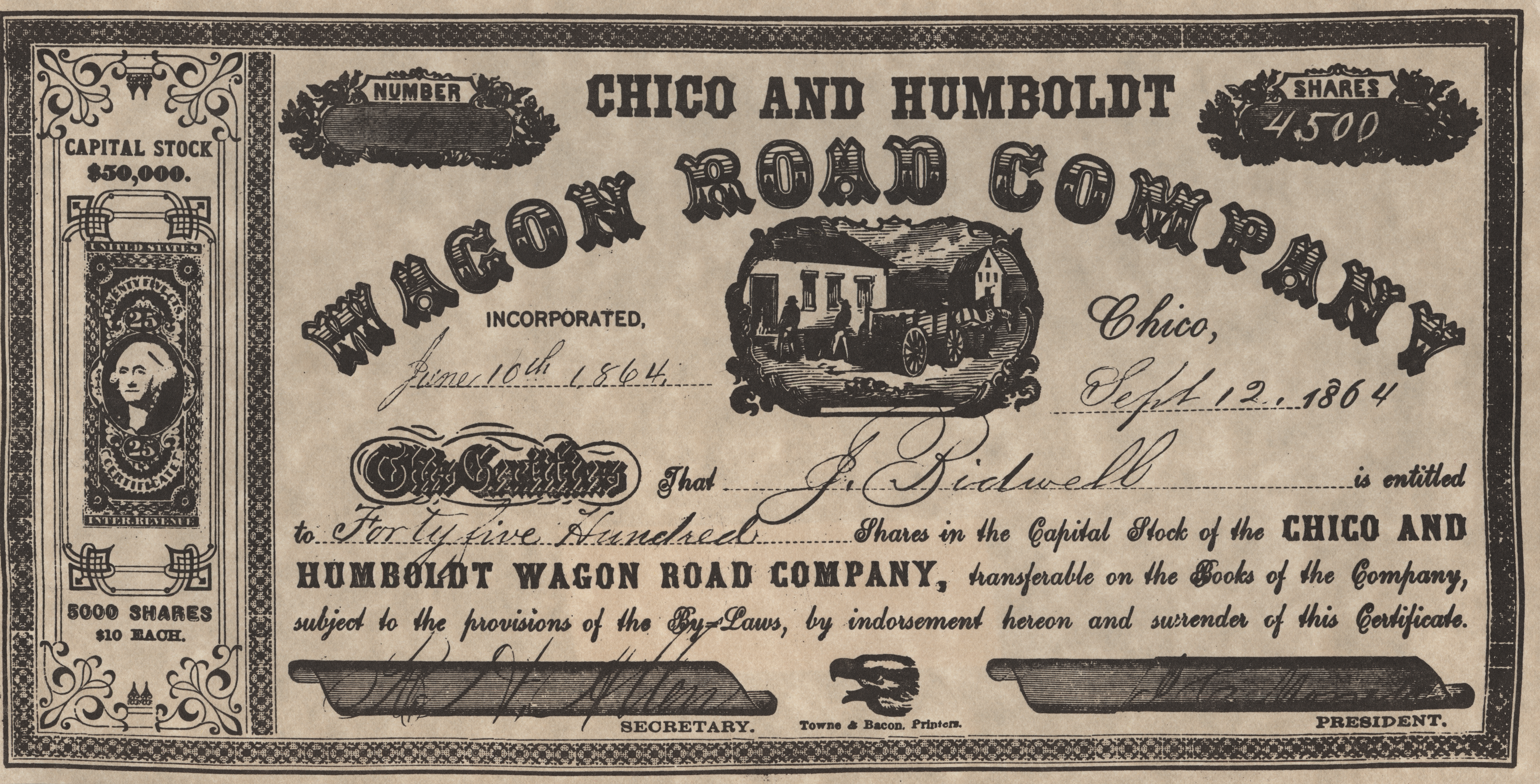
Chico and Humboldt Wagon Road Company stock certificate issued to John Bidwell

After the first transcontinental railroad was completed in 1869, the Humboldt Wagon Road lost its importance as a long-distance route. It remained important as a regional highway, particularly to service the many sawmills and turpentine operations in the pine forests of Butte and Plumas Counties. A summer tourism industry also sprang up along the Humboldt Road, with mountain communities such as Butte Meadows, Jonesville, and (later) Lake Almanor building facilities for vacationers seeking to escape the severe summer heat of the Central Valley.

Although the Humboldt Road avoided the highest elevations of the Sierra Nevada, it was still subject to heavy winter snowfalls that could block traffic for weeks at a time. The severe winters of 1873–1874 and 1875–1876, and a tremendous blizzard in February 1887, all caused significant property loss in the mountain communities along the road. In heavy snow, wagon freight had to be transferred to sleighs, drawn by horses fitted with wooden snowshoes.

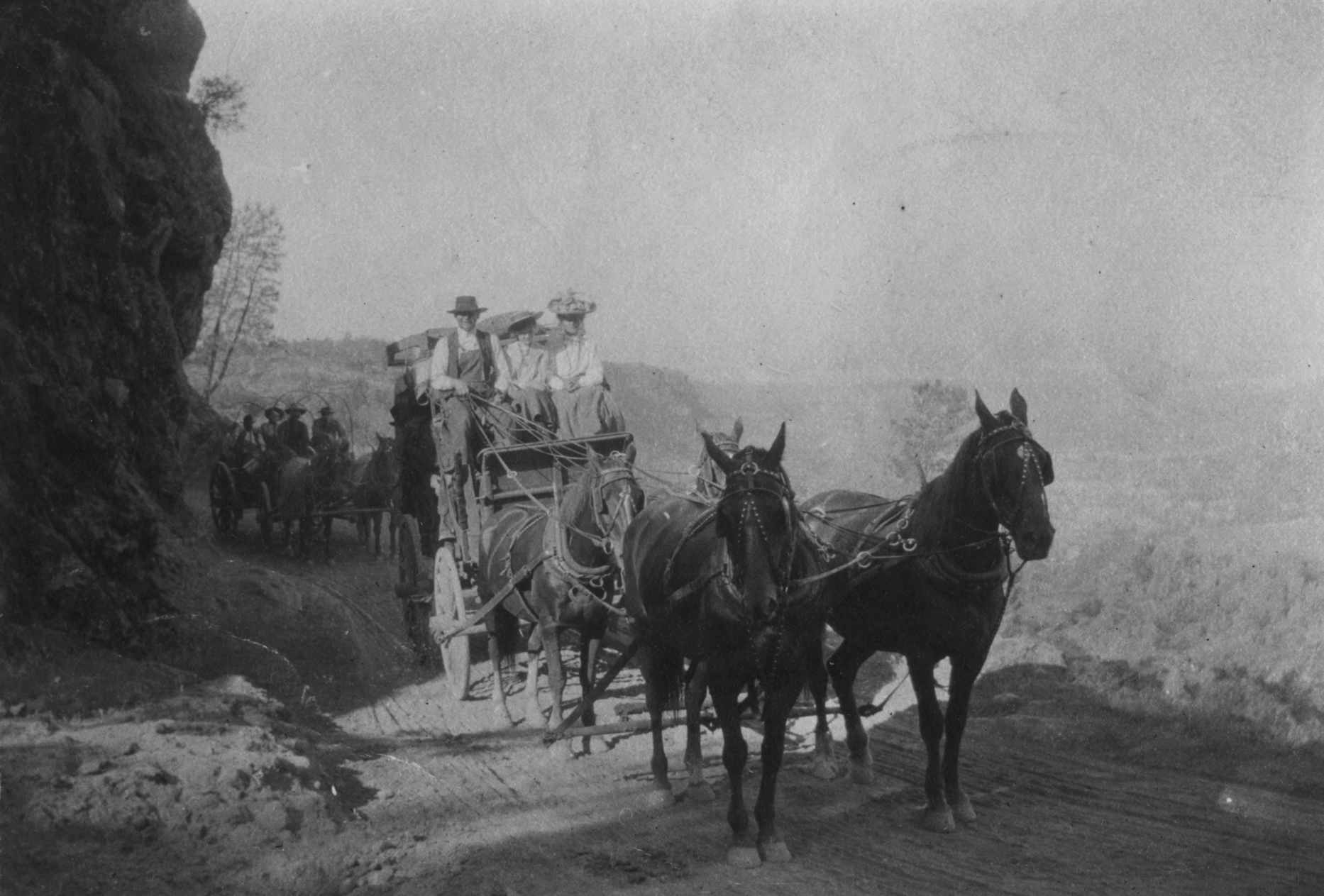
Stagecoach on Humboldt Wagon Road above Big Chico Creek Canyon, 1890s. Courtesy CSU Chico Meriam Library Special Collections.

In April 1883, the Chico and Humboldt Wagon Road Company’s operating lease expired. Responsibility for the road was then handed over to the county and it soon became a free public highway.

In 1897–1898, a major road improvement project was implemented, supported by county funds and citizen contributions. Though he no longer had an ownership interest in the Humboldt Wagon Road, Bidwell maintained involvement in the road's operations through the remainder of his life, and personally worked at construction projects along the road even into old age.

== Later history and present status ==
The Humboldt Road remained an important highway into the automobile era. However, a segment of the road was destroyed when Lake Almanor was created in 1914, along with the original Prattville townsite and countless Maidu cultural sites. When the California state highway system was adopted in 1934, the portion of the Humboldt Road from Chico to Lake Almanor became part of State Highway 32 (Legislative Route No. 47), and the segment from Lake Almanor to Susanville became part of State Highway 36 (Legislative Routes No. 29, 83, and 86). The current routing of Highway 32 via Deer Creek Canyon opened in 1935, and the Humboldt Road from Lomo to Lake Almanor via the Big Summit became a county road once again. Highway 32 between Chico and Lomo was widened and straightened in stages between 1955 and 1970, moving the highway off the original Humboldt Road alignment onto a much safer routing.

Parts of the original Humboldt Wagon Road are still accessible to motor vehicles. The pre-1955 routing of the Humboldt Road remains a public road in the Chico area, and the route over the summit near Jonesville is a forest route that is open in summer and autumn months. Stone retaining walls dating to the 1800s and even wagon wheel ruts can still be found in the hills east of Chico, but are threatened by vandalism and growing residential development in the area.

== See also ==
- California Genocide
- Nobles Emigrant Trail
- Peter Lassen
