= Jonesville, California =

Unincorporated community in California, United States

Jonesville
- Unincorporated community
- Location in California Jonesville (the United States)
- Coordinates: 40°06′45″N 121°28′02″W
- Country: United States
- State: California
- County: Butte
- Elevation: 5,049 ft (1,539 m)

Jonesville is an unincorporated community in Butte County, California, United States. It is situated on Jones Creek, 5 miles (8.0 km) east-northeast of Butte Meadows, at an elevation of 5049 feet (1539 m).

Jonesville was established in the 1860s as a hotel and way station on the Humboldt Wagon Road that connected Chico to silver mines in Idaho and Nevada. Traffic on the Humboldt Road declined after the completion of railroads, but Jonesville continued as a successful mountain resort community for vacationers escaping the severe summer heat of the Sacramento Valley. The Jonesville Hotel remains standing today and was restored in 2019.
