= Brighton Substation =

Historic electrical substation in Sacramento, California

Coordinates: 38.5478°N 121.4080°W

General information
- Type: Electrical substation
- Location: Sacramento, California, United States, 8180 Folsom Blvd
- Completed: 1909
- Owner: Pacific Gas and Electric Company (PG&E)

Design and construction
- Main contractor: Great Western Power Company

Brighton Substation is a historic electrical substation in Sacramento, California. It was constructed by the Great Western Power Company in 1908–09 as part of a pioneering transmission system that carried hydroelectric power generated on the North Fork Feather River to the Sacramento Valley and the San Francisco Bay Area. Brighton substation remains a critical transmission station in active operation by Pacific Gas and Electric Company (PG&E) more than a century later.

== History ==
=== Big Bend–Oakland system ===
Great Western Power Company constructed the Brighton substation as a component of the unprecedented "Stairway of Power" transmission system. In 1908, Great Western completed the Big Bend hydroelectric plant, the first powerhouse in the project. When completed, the Big Bend powerhouse was the most powerful in the world.

To deliver power from the new Big Bend powerhouse, Great Western constructed a 100kV transmission line on newly erected steel towers running approximately 155 miles from the Big Bend powerhouse, through Oroville, Marysville, Sacramento via Brighton substation, and ultimately to Oakland. When completed, the transmission line was the highest capacity and longest distance in the world.

Brighton substation was constructed east of Sacramento in Brighton, California, near a former Pony Express station. In November 1908, Great Western ordered $156,000 in machinery for the substation and spent another $28,000 on its building. Brighton substation was designed to reduce the transmission voltage from 100 kV to 23 kV. Great Western built a second substation closer to downtown Sacramento, at Eighth and R streets, to step down power from 23 kV to 2 kV before being distributed throughout Sacramento. Great Western completed the Brighton substation in 1909 and the Eighth and R substation in 1910.

=== Expansion ===
As Great Western continued to expand the power generation and transmission capacity in its system, it continually expanded capacity at the Brighton substation.

During the 1920s, the Brighton substation also became a connection source for the San Joaquin Valley with the addition of a 103-mile 220 kV transmission line from Brighton substation to the San Joaquin Light and Power system at Wilson substation near Merced. The 220 kV Brighton–Merced line was the highest transmission voltage in commercial use in the United States at the time. In its 1926 survey of advances in electric transmission, the Encyclopædia Britannica noted that the maximum line voltage had risen from 110 kV to 220 kV and identified only four American 220 kV systems operating or under construction at that capacity: Big Creek, PG&E's Pit River–Vaca line, Great Western's 103-mile Brighton–Merced line, and Pennsylvania Power and Light's Wallenpaupack–Allentown line.

PG&E acquired control of Great Western in 1930.

=== Mid-century fires and expansion ===
In March 1943, a lightning strike caused a fire at the Brighton substation, partially destroying it and interrupting electrical service throughout Sacramento. In March 1952, the main transformer at Brighton substation exploded due to an overload, causing another fire.

PG&E quickly repaired the substation after the fires and has continually expanded capacity at Brighton substation since 1930. In 1946, PG&E spent $270,000 on a bank of three new transformers and 22 kV switching equipment. In 1950, PG&E added a new bank of four transformers at a cost of $1.4 million, and updated equipment for "additional regulation and stabilization of the voltage of power supplied from the substation."

In the 1950s, Sacramento's municipal utility company, SMUD, connected two new underground 23 kV lines from Brighton substation to two new local substations.

== Modern facility ==
Brighton remains an important high-voltage transmission substation in PG&Es distribution system.

PG&E's 2009 transmission plan called for replacement of Brighton's No. 9 transformer bank with a 420 MVA, 230/115 kV transformer. The project's diagram identifies the No. 10 bank as 420 MVA and shows Brighton connected toward Rio Oso and Bellota at 230 kV and toward West Sacramento, Davis, and Grand Island at 115 kV.

PG&E's current capital program includes reconstruction of the two Brighton–Grand Island 115 kV lines, including replacement of their remaining lattice steel towers and reconductoring of both circuits.

In 2026, community groups collaborated with PG&E to install new fencing around the substation with vinyl wall mural art celebrating the history of transportation on and around Folsom Boulevard.

== Historic legacy ==
Around 1920, a service station directly across the street from the Brighton substation operated by Louis Basso rebranded itself the Power Inn, a reference to the substation. Basso's Power Inn gained notoriety in the 1920s after two robberies. In November 1923, Basso used a shotgun to ward off an attempted robber at the Power Inn; the robber was later tried for a murder arising from the same crime spree in a heavily publicized trial that featured Basso as a witness. In September 1924, Basso and his wife were tied up during another robbery, and the robbers dangled the Bassos' infant child at gunpoint; Mrs. Basso broke free and chased after the assailants in her nightgown. The Power Inn was also frequently in the newspapers in the 1930s with Basso regularly hosting Turkey hunts, and in 1935 Basso made news when he was charged with selling alcohol in violation of Prohibition. After Basso's death in 1941, Brighton Road was renamed Power Inn Road.

In 2010, the neighborhood acquired recognition as the Power Inn district.

The State of California has included Brighton substation in the California Historical Resources Information System as P-34-000889. The City of Sacramento has listed Brighton substation in its Historic Properties file as Record 048937.

== See also ==
- History of electric power transmission
