= Lake Almanor =

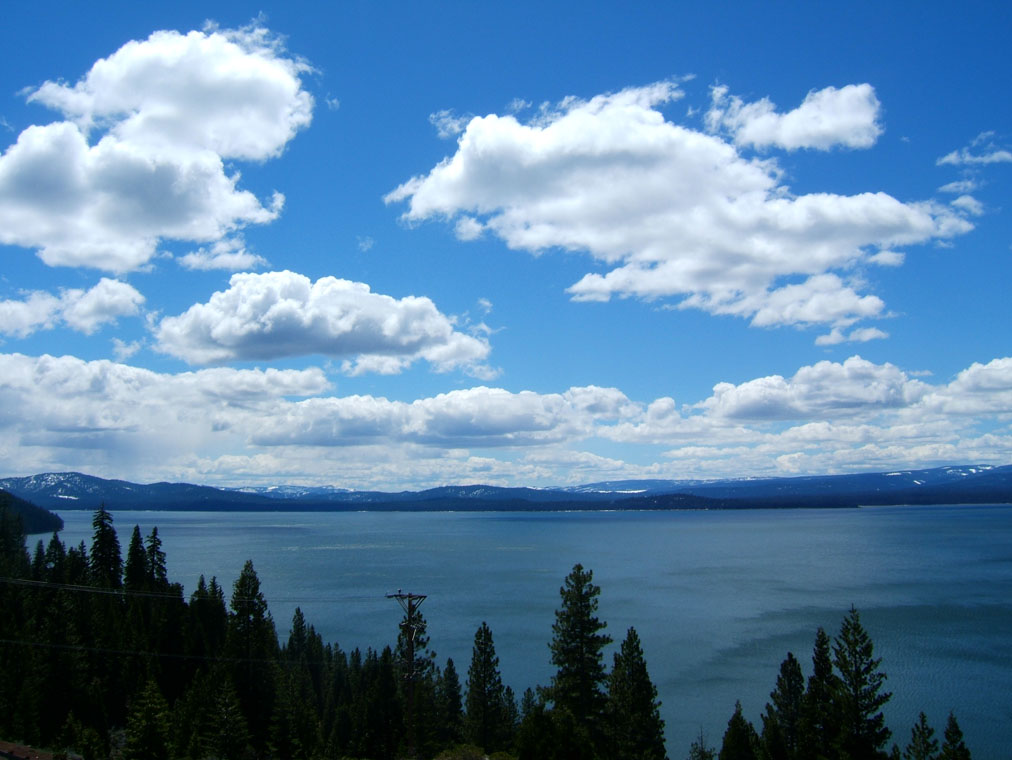
- Lake Almanor from Johnson's Grade

- Location within California Location within the United States
- Location: Plumas County, California
- Coordinates: 40.252778°N 121.160278°W
- Type: Reservoir
- Primary inflows: North Fork of the Feather River, Hamilton Branch, Benner and Last Chance creeks
- Primary outflows: North Fork of the Feather River
- Basin countries: United States
- Managing agency: Pacific Gas and Electric Company
- Max. depth: 90 ft (27 m)
- Surface elevation: 4,505 ft (1,373 m)

Lake Almanor is a large reservoir in northwestern Plumas County, northeastern California, United States. The reservoir has a capacity of 1,308,000 acre-feet (1.613×10^{9} m^{3}) and a maximum depth of about 90 feet (27 meters). The surface area is 43.75 square miles (11,331.2 hectares). It is formed by Canyon Dam on the North Fork of the Feather River, as well as Benner and Last Chance Creeks, Hamilton Branch, and various natural springs.

== Creation ==
The dam is 130 feet (40 m) tall and composed of hydraulic fill.

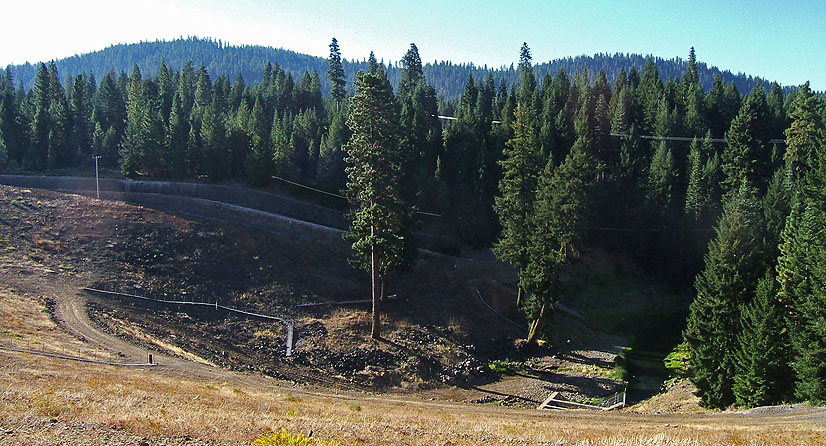
Lake Almanor Dam, spillway, and release point for the North Fork Feather River

The first dam was completed by Great Western Power in 1914 as part of the Upper North Fork Feather River Project, damming the North Fork of the Feather River and flooding the meadow-filled valley generally known as Nakam Koyo/Big Meadows/Big Springs, a longstanding Yamani Maidu village site. When the dam was built, Maidu families still living in the vicinity were displaced, while parts of the town of Prattville had to be moved to higher ground, leaving multiple structures flooded over and cutting off the Humboldt Wagon Road. The reservoir was named for the three daughters of Guy C. Earl, Vice President of Great Western Power: Alice, Martha and Eleanor. The present dam, which more than doubled the lake's size, was constructed by Great Western Power from 1926 to 1927.

The dam is now owned by Pacific Gas and Electric Company. PG&E uses it for hydroelectricity production, but the lake is also a popular recreation area, with fishing, boating, water skiing, swimming and camping available.

The California Office of Environmental Health Hazard Assessment has issued safe eating advice based on mercury for fish caught from Lake Almanor.

== Geography ==
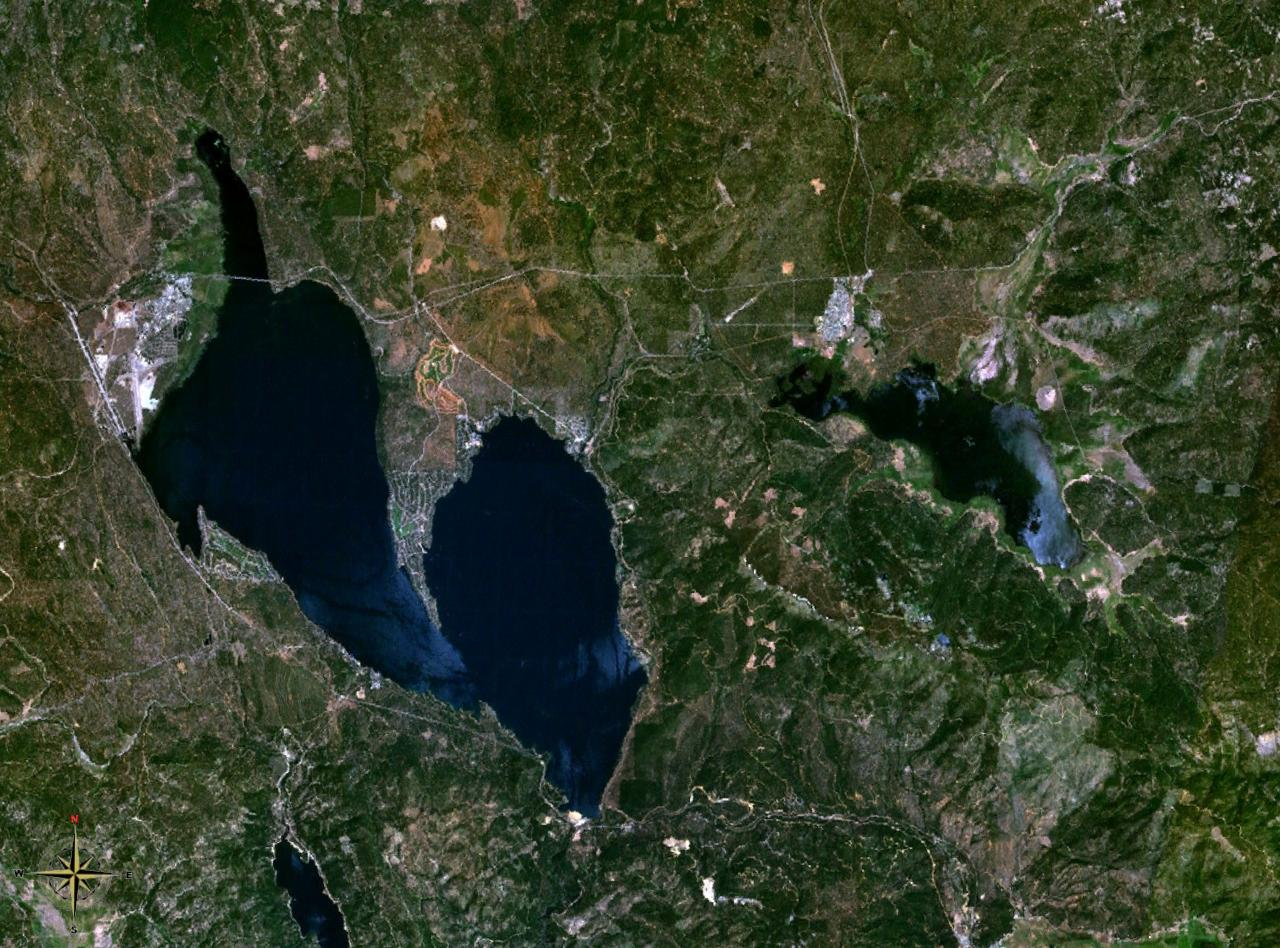
Satellite photo of Lake Almanor (left) and Mountain Meadows Reservoir (right)

The lake-front and immediate surroundings are, either officially or unofficially, divided into a series of regions:

- North Shore, typically referring to the north-east shoreline and the campground of the same name
- The Peninsula, the major east-side peninsula bisecting the lake and largely taken up by the Lake Almanor Country Club, the community of Almanor, and the more recent residential developments known as Bailey Creek and Foxwood
- Hamilton Branch, the east-side community next south of the Peninsula, named for the river of the same name
- East Shore, both the developed and undeveloped areas between Hamilton Branch and the dam itself
- Canyon Dam (also known as Canyondam), the community just southeast of the dam
- South Shore, the southwest shoreline taken up largely by PG&E managed campgrounds and undeveloped grounds
- Prattville, the small resort community on the southwest shoreline; retains the same name as the town that was once in Big Meadows (now underwater)
- West Shore, on the upper southwest shore and more formally referred to as Lake Almanor West, itself an un-gated country-club
- The generally nameless western shoreline from Lake Almanor West to the town of Chester, starting at Goose Bay and ending at the termination of the large diversion channel that mitigates high-waters in the Feather River above Chester
- The northern shoreline from Chester, running northeast then southwest, and back to Hwy 36; includes the mouth of Benner and Last Chance creeks and seasonal springs

Much of the southern shore of the lake is in the Lassen National Forest, so recreation management is shared by PG&E and the United States Forest Service.

Large areas along the northern shore of the lake are seasonal pastures used for summer and fall cattle grazing; some areas of these grazing grounds are underwater in wetter years. The wetlands at the north end also serve as breeding grounds for a variety of migratory waterfowl, most prominently Canada geese and various species of ducks including mallard, teal, and wigeon. Other large birds to be viewed around the lake are heron, osprey, and occasionally bald eagles, which nest on the Peninsula and West Shore. Each year in late June and early July, large insect hatches occur on the lake during dusk. The insects on which the fish feed attract local fly fishermen who use imitation flies to catch the feeding fish.

The Almanor Basin Watershed Advisory Committee Group (ABWAC) received funding for a Watershed Assessment Project under California Prop 12, and one deliverable from this project was in an online map-based database of watershed information that runs on Google Earth. A tour can be downloaded.

== Thermal curtain ==
PG&E's 50-year license to use the waters of Lake Almanor was set to expire in 2004, when the State Water Board explored requests to install a thermal curtain at the bottom of the lake, to control the temperature of the Feather River downstream. This was ostensibly to create better habitat for trout in the river, up to 40 miles downstream. However, residents near Lake Almanor became concerned that the curtain would help the downstream fish population at the expense of raising the water temperature of the relatively shallow Lake Almanor itself, thus harming its fish population, and causing potential adverse impacts on recreational fishing in the lake.

== Power production ==
There is no powerhouse at the dam. A tunnel (and finally a penstock) from the powerhouse outlet tower, in the lake between Prattville and the Plumas Pines Resort, delivers water to the Butt Valley Powerhouse at the north end of Butt Valley Reservoir, which has a capacity of 41 MW. From there, the water is sent by tunnel to either the Caribou 1 (74 MW) or Caribou 2 (120 MW) powerhouses. Caribou 2 is favored because it is newer and more efficient. Their tailraces flow into Belden Reservoir. A portion of the water goes through the 1.3-MW Oak Flat Powerhouse, which is located at the bottom of Belden Dam. The rest goes to the 125-MW Belden Powerhouse by another tunnel. The water is then released into Rock Creek Reservoir. As of 2008, all of these powerhouse facilities were owned and operated by the Pacific Gas and Electric Company (PG&E), a major investor-owned California utility.

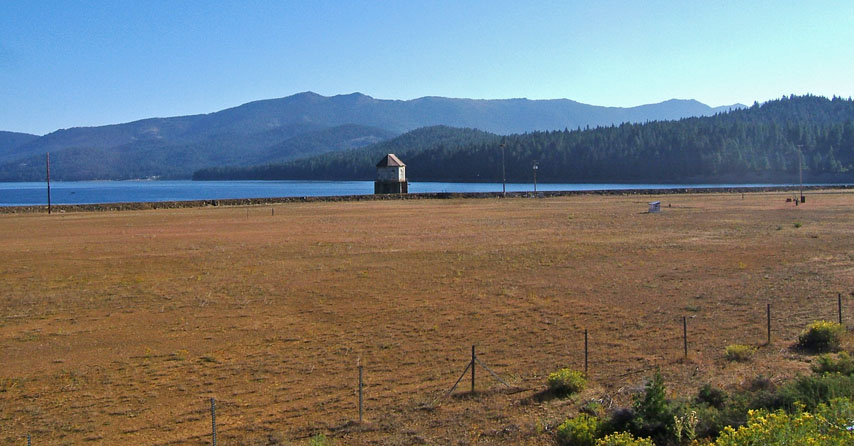
Intake tower at Almanor dam, supplying a year-round flow to the continuation of the North Fork of the Feather River

== Seismic Activity ==
Lake Almanor was struck by two(2) >5 Magnitude earthquakes in May 2023: 5.2 Time(UTC): 2023/05/12 10:18:41 Time(Local): 2023/05/12 03:18:41 PDT Depth: 6.1 km (3.8 miles) Event Id: 73887046.

== See also ==
- List of lakes in California
- List of dams and reservoirs in California
- List of largest reservoirs in the United States
- List of largest reservoirs of California
- Indigenous peoples of California
