= Flea Valley, California =

Flea Valley
- Former settlement
- Location in California
- Coordinates: 39°49′47″N 121°28′59″W
- Country: United States
- State: California
- County: Butte
- Elevation: 3,684 ft (1,123 m)

Flea Valley (also, Flea Valley House) is a former settlement and mining camp in Butte County, California, United States. It was located northeast of Magalia, at an elevation of 3684 feet (1123 m) and east of Pulga (Pulga is the Spanish word for flea). Flea Valley still appeared on USGS maps as of 1897.

Flea Valley had a saloon, grocery and hotel. The hotel was operated by Gus Fairbanks, then his wife. From 1867 until 1907, Betty Duensing operated the hotel. By 1931, Flea Valley consisted of a few abandoned buildings.
