= Lake Almanor West, California =

Lake Almanor West
- Unincorporated Community; Census Designated Place
- Location in Plumas County and the state of California

- Location in the United States
- Coordinates: 40°14′7″N 121°12′15″W
- Country: United States
- State: California
- County: Plumas

Area
  - Total: 2.286 sq mi (5.920 km^{2})
  - Land: 2.286 sq mi (5.920 km^{2})
  - Water: 0 sq mi (0 km^{2}) 0%

Population (2020)
  - Total: 211
  - Density: 92.3/sq mi (35.6/km^{2})
- Time zone: UTC-8 (Pacific (PST))
  - Summer (DST): UTC-7 (PDT)
- ZIP code: 96020
- Area code: 530
- FIPS code: 06-39425

Lake Almanor West is a census-designated place (CDP) in Plumas County, California, United States. The population was 211 at the 2020 census, down from 270 at the 2010 census.

== Geography ==
Lake Almanor West is located at 40°14′7″N 121°12′15″W (40.235246, -121.204180), along the southwestern shore of Lake Almanor. It is locally referred to as "West Shore."

According to the United States Census Bureau, the CDP has a total area of 2.3 square miles (6.0 km^{2}), all land.

== Demographics ==
Historical population
| Census | Pop. | Note | %± |
|---|---|---|---|
| 2000 | 329 | | — |
| 2010 | 270 | | −17.9% |
| 2020 | 211 | | −21.9% |
U.S. Decennial Census; 1860–1870 1880-1890; 1900 1910 1920; 1930 1940 1950; 1960 1970 1980; 1990 2000 2010

Lake Almanor West first appeared as a census designated place in the 2000 U.S. census.

=== 2020 ===
Lake Almanor West CDP, California – Racial and ethnic composition Note: the US Census treats Hispanic/Latino as an ethnic category. This table excludes Latinos from the racial categories and assigns them to a separate category. Hispanics/Latinos may be of any race.
| Race / Ethnicity (NH = Non-Hispanic) | Pop 2000 | Pop 2010 | Pop 2020 | % 2000 | % 2010 | % 2020 |
|---|---|---|---|---|---|---|
| White alone (NH) | 320 | 250 | 190 | 97.26% | 92.59% | 90.05% |
| Black or African American alone (NH) | 0 | 1 | 0 | 0.00% | 0.37% | 0.00% |
| Native American or Alaska Native alone (NH) | 0 | 1 | 0 | 0.00% | 0.37% | 0.00% |
| Asian alone (NH) | 0 | 0 | 1 | 0.00% | 0.00% | 0.47% |
| Native Hawaiian or Pacific Islander alone (NH) | 0 | 1 | 1 | 0.00% | 0.37% | 0.47% |
| Other race alone (NH) | 0 | 0 | 0 | 0.00% | 0.00% | 0.00% |
| Mixed race or Multiracial (NH) | 3 | 6 | 17 | 0.91% | 2.22% | 8.06% |
| Hispanic or Latino (any race) | 6 | 11 | 2 | 1.82% | 4.07% | 0.95% |
| Total | 329 | 270 | 211 | 100.00% | 100.00% | 100.00% |

The 2020 United States census reported that Lake Almanor West had a population of 211. The population density was 92.3 inhabitants per square mile (35.6/km^{2}). The racial makeup of Lake Almanor West was 191 (90.5%) White, 0 (0.0%) African American, 0 (0.0%) Native American, 1 (0.5%) Asian, 1 (0.5%) Pacific Islander, 1 (0.5%) from other races, and 17 (8.1%) from two or more races. Hispanic or Latino of any race were 2 persons (0.9%).

The whole population lived in households. There were 114 households, out of which 16 (14.0%) had children under the age of 18 living in them, 73 (64.0%) were married-couple households, 9 (7.9%) were cohabiting couple households, 16 (14.0%) had a female householder with no partner present, and 16 (14.0%) had a male householder with no partner present. 26 households (22.8%) were one person, and 16 (14.0%) were one person aged 65 or older. The average household size was 1.85. There were 84 families (73.7% of all households).

The age distribution was 15 people (7.1%) under the age of 18, 17 people (8.1%) aged 18 to 24, 25 people (11.8%) aged 25 to 44, 49 people (23.2%) aged 45 to 64, and 105 people (49.8%) who were 65 years of age or older. The median age was 64.8 years. For every 100 females, there were 108.9 males.

There were 498 housing units at an average density of 217.8 units per square mile (84.1 units/km^{2}), of which 114 (22.9%) were occupied. Of these, 91 (79.8%) were owner-occupied, and 23 (20.2%) were occupied by renters.

=== 2010 ===
The 2010 United States census reported that Lake Almanor West had a population of 270. The population density was 118.1 inhabitants per square mile (45.6/km^{2}). The racial makeup of Lake Almanor West was 259 (95.9%) White, 1 (0.4%) African American, 1 (0.4%) Native American, 0 (0.0%) Asian, 1 (0.4%) Pacific Islander, 1 (0.4%) from other races, and 7 (2.6%) from two or more races. Hispanic or Latino of any race were 11 persons (4.1%).

The Census reported that 270 people (100% of the population) lived in households, 0 (0%) lived in non-institutionalized group quarters, and 0 (0%) were institutionalized.

There were 134 households, out of which 8 (6.0%) had children under the age of 18 living in them, 108 (80.6%) were opposite-sex married couples living together, 3 (2.2%) had a female householder with no husband present, 2 (1.5%) had a male householder with no wife present. There were 3 (2.2%) unmarried opposite-sex partnerships, and 0 (0%) same-sex married couples or partnerships. 20 households (14.9%) were made up of individuals, and 13 (9.7%) had someone living alone who was 65 years of age or older. The average household size was 2.01. There were 113 families (84.3% of all households); the average family size was 2.17.

The population was spread out, with 12 people (4.4%) under the age of 18, 3 people (1.1%) aged 18 to 24, 16 people (5.9%) aged 25 to 44, 99 people (36.7%) aged 45 to 64, and 140 people (51.9%) who were 65 years of age or older. The median age was 65.4 years. For every 100 females, there were 107.7 males. For every 100 females age 18 and over, there were 106.4 males.

There were 475 housing units at an average density of 207.8 per square mile (80.2/km^{2}), of which 129 (96.3%) were owner-occupied, and 5 (3.7%) were occupied by renters. The homeowner vacancy rate was 7.2%; the rental vacancy rate was 40.0%. 261 people (96.7% of the population) lived in owner-occupied housing units and 9 people (3.3%) lived in rental housing units.

== Politics ==
In the state legislature, Lake Almanor West is in the 1st senatorial district, represented by Republican Megan Dahle, and the 1st Assembly district, represented by Republican Heather Hadwick.

Federally, Lake Almanor West is in California's 3rd congressional district, represented by Independent Kevin Kiley.

== Education ==
The school district is Plumas Unified School District.
