= Canyondam, California =

Canyondam
- Unincorporated Community; Census Designated Place
- Location in Plumas County and the state of California

- Location in the United States
- Coordinates: 40°10′12″N 121°4′32″W
- Country: United States
- State: California
- County: Plumas

Area
  - Total: 0.77 sq mi (1.99 km^{2})
  - Land: 0.77 sq mi (1.99 km^{2})
  - Water: 0 sq mi (0.00 km^{2}) 0%
- Elevation: 4,600 ft (1,400 m)

Population (2020)
  - Total: 30
  - Density: 39.1/sq mi (15.11/km^{2})
- Time zone: UTC-8 (Pacific (PST))
  - Summer (DST): UTC-7 (PDT)
- ZIP code: 95923
- Area codes: 530, 837
- FIPS code: 06-10914
- GNIS feature IDs: 1658212; 2407959

Canyondam (formerly, Canyon Dam) is a census-designated place (CDP) in Plumas County, California, United States. Canyondam is located near the dam that forms Lake Almanor, 6.25 miles (10.1 km) east-southeast of Almanor. The population was 30 at the 2020 census, down from 31 as of the 2010 census. On August 6, 2021, the community was destroyed in the Dixie Fire.

== History ==
The Canyondam post office opened in 1940, closed in 1944, and reopened in 1952.

An earthquake measuring 5.7 Mw struck on May 23, 2013, and was felt over much of Northern California with a maximum Mercalli intensity of VII (Very strong). Its epicenter was about 1.6 miles (2.6 km) from Canyondam.

=== Dixie Fire ===
On August 6, 2021, the Dixie Fire burned through the town on its path to Lake Almanor. Around 95% of the structures were destroyed, including the post office.

== Geography ==
Canyondam is located at 40°10′12″N 121°4′32″W (40.169921, -121.075586).

According to the United States Census Bureau, the CDP has a total area of 0.8 square miles (2.1 km^{2}), all land.

=== Climate ===
This region experiences warm (but not hot) and dry summers, with no average monthly temperatures above 71.6 °F. According to the Köppen Climate Classification system, Canyondam has a warm-summer Mediterranean climate, abbreviated "Csb" on climate maps.

Climate data for Canyondam (1991–2020 normals, extremes 1914–2021)
| Month | Jan | Feb | Mar | Apr | May | Jun | Jul | Aug | Sep | Oct | Nov | Dec | Year |
|---|---|---|---|---|---|---|---|---|---|---|---|---|---|
| Record high °F (°C) | 67 (19) | 72 (22) | 84 (29) | 87 (31) | 95 (35) | 102 (39) | 104 (40) | 104 (40) | 98 (37) | 95 (35) | 74 (23) | 69 (21) | 104 (40) |
| Mean daily maximum °F (°C) | 41.8 (5.4) | 45.3 (7.4) | 50.9 (10.5) | 57.8 (14.3) | 68.0 (20.0) | 77.8 (25.4) | 86.3 (30.2) | 85.2 (29.6) | 78.9 (26.1) | 65.5 (18.6) | 50.1 (10.1) | 41.0 (5.0) | 62.4 (16.9) |
| Daily mean °F (°C) | 33.5 (0.8) | 35.8 (2.1) | 39.8 (4.3) | 44.8 (7.1) | 53.5 (11.9) | 61.2 (16.2) | 68.3 (20.2) | 67.0 (19.4) | 61.3 (16.3) | 50.8 (10.4) | 39.8 (4.3) | 33.0 (0.6) | 49.1 (9.5) |
| Mean daily minimum °F (°C) | 25.2 (−3.8) | 26.2 (−3.2) | 28.6 (−1.9) | 31.8 (−0.1) | 38.9 (3.8) | 44.6 (7.0) | 50.3 (10.2) | 48.7 (9.3) | 43.8 (6.6) | 36.2 (2.3) | 29.6 (−1.3) | 25.1 (−3.8) | 35.8 (2.1) |
| Record low °F (°C) | −16 (−27) | −14 (−26) | −4 (−20) | 6 (−14) | 19 (−7) | 26 (−3) | 31 (−1) | 25 (−4) | 22 (−6) | 13 (−11) | 4 (−16) | −14 (−26) | −16 (−27) |
| Average precipitation inches (mm) | 6.36 (162) | 6.36 (162) | 5.66 (144) | 2.86 (73) | 1.94 (49) | 0.82 (21) | 0.14 (3.6) | 0.17 (4.3) | 0.35 (8.9) | 1.95 (50) | 3.64 (92) | 6.84 (174) | 37.09 (942) |
| Average snowfall inches (cm) | 28.5 (72) | 22.3 (57) | 17.1 (43) | 7.3 (19) | 0.5 (1.3) | 0.1 (0.25) | 0.0 (0.0) | 0.0 (0.0) | 0.0 (0.0) | 0.8 (2.0) | 7.1 (18) | 25.6 (65) | 109.3 (278) |
| Average precipitation days (≥ 0.01 in) | 11.4 | 10.8 | 10.7 | 8.6 | 7.1 | 3.3 | 0.8 | 0.8 | 2.1 | 5.4 | 8.4 | 11.5 | 80.9 |
| Average snowy days (≥ 0.1 in) | 6.5 | 6.0 | 4.9 | 2.3 | 0.3 | 0.0 | 0.0 | 0.0 | 0.0 | 0.3 | 2.4 | 5.4 | 28.1 |
Source 1: NOAA
Source 2: WRCC (extremes)

== Demographics ==
Historical population
| Census | Pop. | Note | %± |
|---|---|---|---|
| 2000 | 37 | | — |
| 2010 | 31 | | −16.2% |
| 2020 | 30 | | −3.2% |
U.S. Decennial Census; 1850–1870 1880-1890; 1900 1910 1920; 1930 1940 1950; 1960 1970 1980; 1990 2000 2010

Canyondam first appeared as a census designated place in the 2000 U.S. census.

=== Racial and ethnic composition ===
Canyondam CDP, California – Racial and ethnic composition Note: the US Census treats Hispanic/Latino as an ethnic category. This table excludes Latinos from the racial categories and assigns them to a separate category. Hispanics/Latinos may be of any race.
| Race / Ethnicity (NH = Non-Hispanic) | Pop 2000 | Pop 2010 | Pop 2020 | % 2000 | % 2010 | % 2020 |
|---|---|---|---|---|---|---|
| White alone (NH) | 33 | 26 | 22 | 89.19% | 83.87% | 73.33% |
| Black or African American alone (NH) | 0 | 0 | 0 | 0.00% | 0.00% | 0.00% |
| Native American or Alaska Native alone (NH) | 4 | 1 | 0 | 10.81% | 3.23% | 0.00% |
| Asian alone (NH) | 0 | 2 | 3 | 0.00% | 6.45% | 10.00% |
| Native Hawaiian or Pacific Islander alone (NH) | 0 | 0 | 0 | 0.00% | 0.00% | 0.00% |
| Other race alone (NH) | 0 | 0 | 0 | 0.00% | 0.00% | 0.00% |
| Mixed race or Multiracial (NH) | 0 | 0 | 0 | 0.00% | 0.00% | 0.00% |
| Hispanic or Latino (any race) | 0 | 2 | 5 | 0.00% | 6.45% | 16.67% |
| Total | 37 | 31 | 30 | 100.00% | 100.00% | 100.00% |

=== 2020 census ===
As of the 2020 census, Canyondam had a population of 30. The median age was 71.6 years. 6.7% of residents were under the age of 18 and 70.0% of residents were 65 years of age or older. For every 100 females there were 200.0 males, and for every 100 females age 18 and over there were 211.1 males age 18 and over.

0.0% of residents lived in urban areas, while 100.0% lived in rural areas.

There were 22 households in Canyondam, of which 18.2% had children under the age of 18 living in them. Of all households, 27.3% were married-couple households, 22.7% were households with a male householder and no spouse or partner present, and 45.5% were households with a female householder and no spouse or partner present. About 63.6% of all households were made up of individuals and 31.8% had someone living alone who was 65 years of age or older.

There were 22 housing units, of which 0.0% were vacant. The homeowner vacancy rate was 0.0% and the rental vacancy rate was 0.0%.

=== 2010 census ===
At the 2010 census Canyondam had a population of 31. The population density was 40.0 inhabitants per square mile (15.4/km^{2}). The racial makeup of Canyondam was 26 (83.9%) White, 0 (0.0%) African American, 3 (9.7%) Native American, 2 (6.5%) Asian, 0 (0.0%) Pacific Islander, 0 (0.0%) from other races, and 0 (0.0%) from two or more races. Hispanic or Latino of any race were 2 people (6.5%).

The whole population lived in households, no one lived in non-institutionalized group quarters and no one was institutionalized.

There were 17 households, 4 (23.5%) had children under the age of 18 living in them, 6 (35.3%) were opposite-sex married couples living together, 2 (11.8%) had a female householder with no husband present, 1 (5.9%) had a male householder with no wife present. There were 1 (5.9%) unmarried opposite-sex partnerships, and 0 (0%) same-sex married couples or partnerships. 7 households (41.2%) were one person and 2 (11.8%) had someone living alone who was 65 or older. The average household size was 1.82. There were 9 families (52.9% of households); the average family size was 2.44.

The age distribution was 4 people (12.9%) under the age of 18, 2 people (6.5%) aged 18 to 24, 5 people (16.1%) aged 25 to 44, 16 people (51.6%) aged 45 to 64, and 4 people (12.9%) who were 65 or older. The median age was 48.5 years. For every 100 females, there were 121.4 males. For every 100 females age 18 and over, there were 107.7 males.

There were 27 housing units at an average density of 34.8 per square mile, of the occupied units 11 (64.7%) were owner-occupied and 6 (35.3%) were rented. The homeowner vacancy rate was 0%; the rental vacancy rate was 14.3%. 18 people (58.1% of the population) lived in owner-occupied housing units and 13 people (41.9%) lived in rental housing units.

=== 2000 census ===
At the 2000 census there were 37 people, 21 households, and 11 families in the CDP. The population density was 48.0 inhabitants per square mile (18.5/km^{2}). There were 62 housing units at an average density of 80.5 per square mile (31.1/km^{2}). The racial makeup of the CDP was 89.19% White, and 10.81% Native American. Of the 21 households 14.3% had children under the age of 18 living with them, 33.3% were married couples living together, 4.8% had a female householder with no husband present, and 47.6% were non-families. 42.9% of households were one person and none had someone living alone who was 65 or older. The average household size was 1.76 and the average family size was 2.18.

The age distribution was 13.5% under the age of 18, 5.4% from 18 to 24, 16.2% from 25 to 44, 43.2% from 45 to 64, and 21.6% 65 or older. The median age was 50 years. For every 100 females, there were 117.6 males. For every 100 females age 18 and over, there were 128.6 males.

The median household income was $40,104 and the median family income was $35,000. Males had a median income of $0 versus $41,250 for females. The per capita income for the CDP was $22,620. None of the population and none of the families were below the poverty line.

== Politics ==
In the state legislature, Canyondam is in the 1st senatorial district, represented by Republican Megan Dahle, and the 1st Assembly district, represented by Republican Heather Hadwick.

Federally, Canyondam is in California's 3rd congressional district, represented by Independent Kevin Kiley.

== Education ==
The school district is Plumas Unified School District.
