= North Fork Feather River =

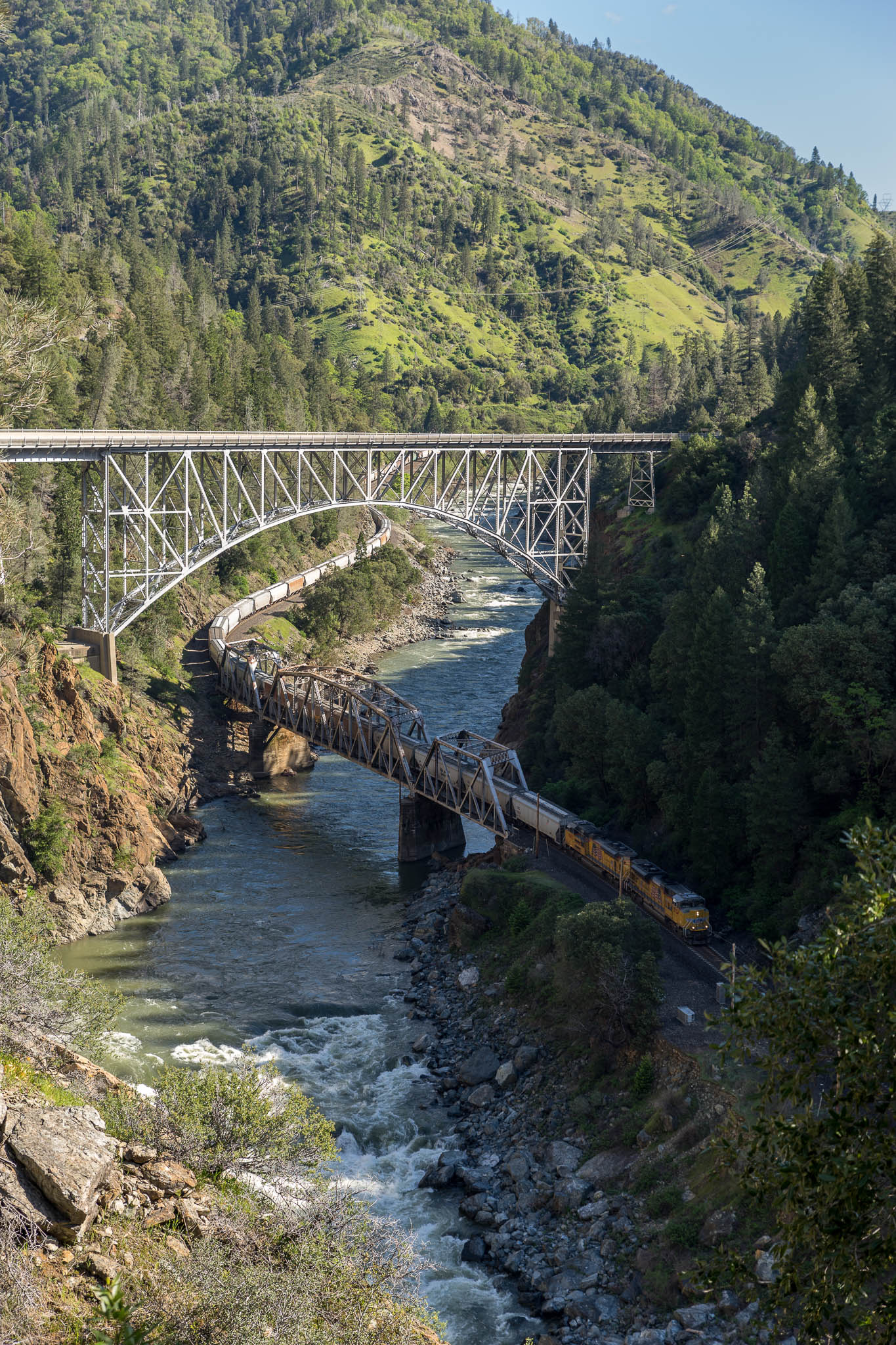
- Freight train crossing the North Fork, 2017

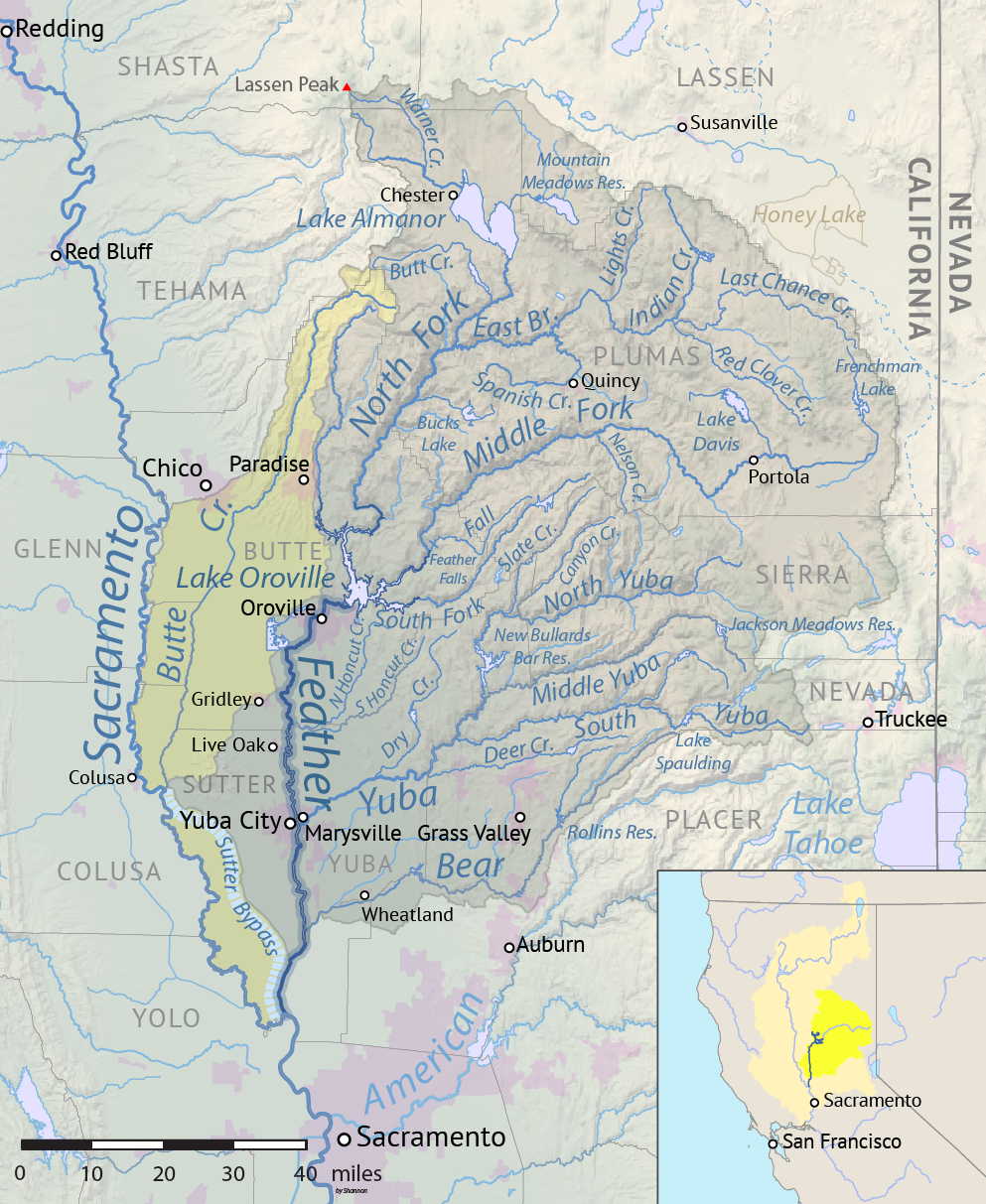
- Map of the Feather River drainage basin. The North Fork flows from Lassen Peak southward to Lake Oroville.

Location
- Country: United States
- State: California
- Region: North Fork Feather Watershed; 1,090 sq mi (2,800 km^{2}), including the West Fork but not East Branch Watershed

Physical characteristics
- Source confluence: Rice Creek (Feather River) & South Arm Rice Creek
  - location: Feather River Meadows
- Mouth: Lake Oroville, North Arm^{A}
- Length: 70 mi (110 km)
- Basin size: 2,100 sq mi (5,400 km^{2})
- Discharge
  - location: mouth at north arm, Lake Oroville; max and min at Pulga
  - average: 2,930 cu ft/s (83 m^{3}/s)
  - minimum: 5.4 cu ft/s (0.15 m^{3}/s)
  - maximum: 105,400 cu ft/s (2,980 m^{3}/s)

The North Fork Feather River is a watercourse of the northern Sierra Nevada and southern Cascades in the U.S. state of California. It flows generally southwards from its headwaters near Lassen Peak to Lake Oroville, a reservoir formed by Oroville Dam in the foothills of the Sierra, where it runs into the Feather River. The river drains about 2,100 square miles (5,400 km^{2}) of the western slope of the Sierras. By discharge, it is the largest tributary of the Feather.

== Course ==
It rises at the confluence of Rice Creek and a smaller unnamed stream in the southern part of the Lassen Volcanic National Park. The North Fork Feather River starts with streams tributary to Lake Almanor, and after joining the East Branch North Fork, continues downstream to Lake Oroville. The East Branch of North Fork Feather River watershed area includes two major tributaries from the east side of Plumas County, Spanish Creek, and Indian Creek, which is joined by Last Chance and Red Clover Creeks. Both drain to the North Fork Feather River. Kings Creek, which is a source of one of four watersheds arising on Mt. Lassen, also ends up feeding into the Upper Feather watershed. Kings Creek drains a small section, approximately 1.0×106 m^{2}, on the southeast side of Lassen Peak. It joins with Hot Springs Creek to form Warner Creek, as the two creeks enter Warner Valley. The North Fork flows east, receiving Warner Creek from the left, and passes the town of Chester. It then empties into Lake Almanor, which is formed by the Canyon Dam. After leaving the dam the river cuts south into a gorge, and turns southwest to receive Butt Creek from the right. The East Branch North Fork Feather River, the North Fork's largest tributary, comes in next to Caribou Rd (40°00′49.9″N 121°13′32.4″W). It then flows southwards, through several hydroelectric dams, into the north arm of Lake Oroville.

== River modifications ==
The fork's portion of the Feather River Canyon is notable as part of the Feather River Route, and the railroad's North Fork Bridge near the river's mouth is the longest reinforced concrete bridge in the US.

The North Fork is heavily developed for hydroelectricity generation and is impounded by five dams, as part of three hydroelectric projects – the Upper North Fork Feather River Project, the Rock Creek-Cresta Hydroelectric Project and the Poe Hydroelectric Project. The system is so extensive that it has been dubbed the "Stairway of Power".

== Meteorology ==
The Feather River Canyon is well known for high winds. The "Jarbo Winds", named for nearby Jarbo Gap, often blow down the canyon from the northeast. These katabatic winds are caused by high-pressure air over the Great Basin seeking a path through the Sierra Nevada to the low-pressure voids on the California coast. The 2018 Camp Fire, the deadliest wildfire in California's history, was driven into Paradise by these winds. Meteorological records show 36 days since 2003 with gusts of 100 mph or more, up to 200 mph.

== Watershed ==
The North Fork Feather Watershed (USGS Huc 18020121) extends from the North Fork headwaters south-southwest to the Lower Feather Watershed. The headwaters are in the Shasta Cascades and the northern Sierras along the Pit River and Eagle-Honey watersheds. The drainage divide for the headwaters begins in Shasta County at the Lassen Peak quadruple watershed point of East Sulpher Creek (Mill-Big Chico), Manzanita Creek (Upper Cow-Battle watershed), Lost Creek (Lower Pit River), and Kings Creek (North Fork Feather). The headwater divide extends in an arc east to Lassen County, then to the Great Basin Divide triple point of the Feather, Pit, and Susan Rivers. The divide arcs southeast to Pegleg Mountain and along 13 mi (21 km) of the Sierra Crest to the triple point with the East Branch North Fork Feather River on the east slope of Indicator Peak (40.012069°N 120.187554°W).

Downstream of Shasta and Lassen counties, the majority of the North Fork Feather Watershed area is in Plumas County. The west divide of the watershed is along the Mill-Big Chico Watershed, southward to the West Branch Feather River triple point. The southeast divide of the North Fork Feather Watershed is the watershed of the East Branch to the triple point with the Middle Fork Feather River. The lowest elevations of the North Fork Feather Watershed are in Butte County, with the emergency weir crest at 901 ft (275 m) and, at average storage capacity, the Lake Oroville level of 812 ft (247 m) .

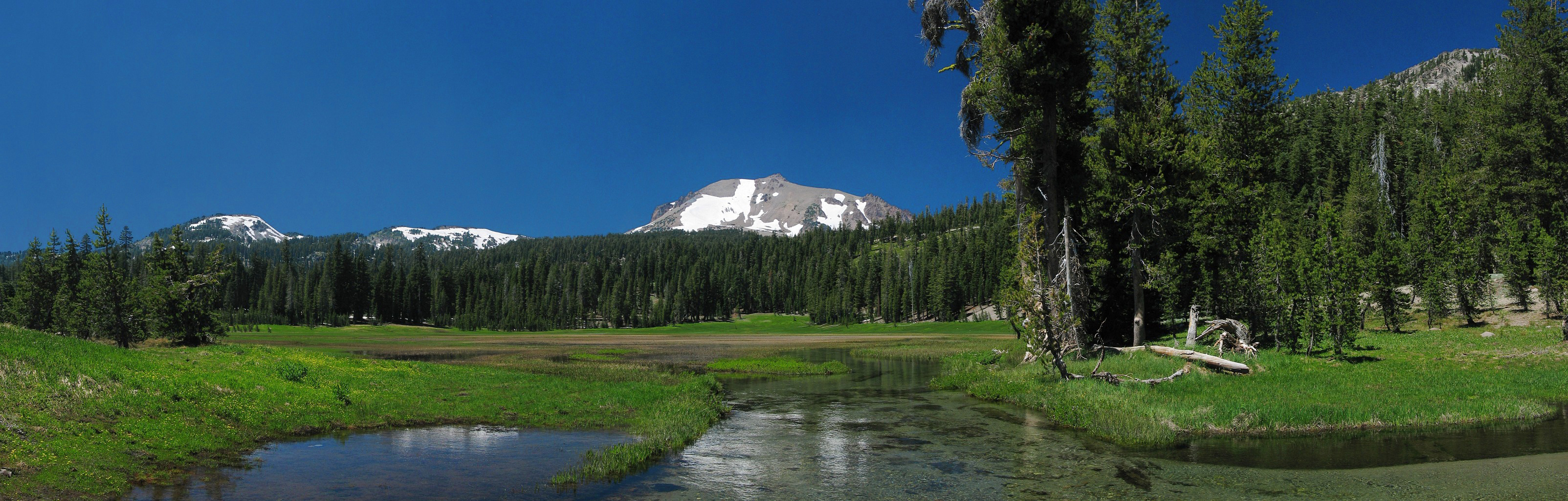
Kings Creek (foreground) headwaters flow >11 mi (18 km) from the SE slope of Lassen Peak (background), >7 mi (11 km) in Warner Creek, and >63 mi (101 km) in the North Fork to Lake Oroville's northern arm.
