= North Fork Bridge (California) =

Coordinates: 39°43′00″N 121°28′13″W

The North Fork Bridge is a railroad bridge over the North Fork Feather River in the Feather River Canyon, located in Plumas County, California at the approximate coordinates of 39°42'60" N, 121°28'14" W.

It is the longest reinforced concrete bridge in the United States.

It was built after the June 1957 groundbreaking for two rail tunnels on the Feather River Route of the Western Pacific Railroad, to join them in bypassing the planned new Oroville Reservoir.

== See also ==
- Railroad bridges in California
