= Mountain Meadows Reservoir =

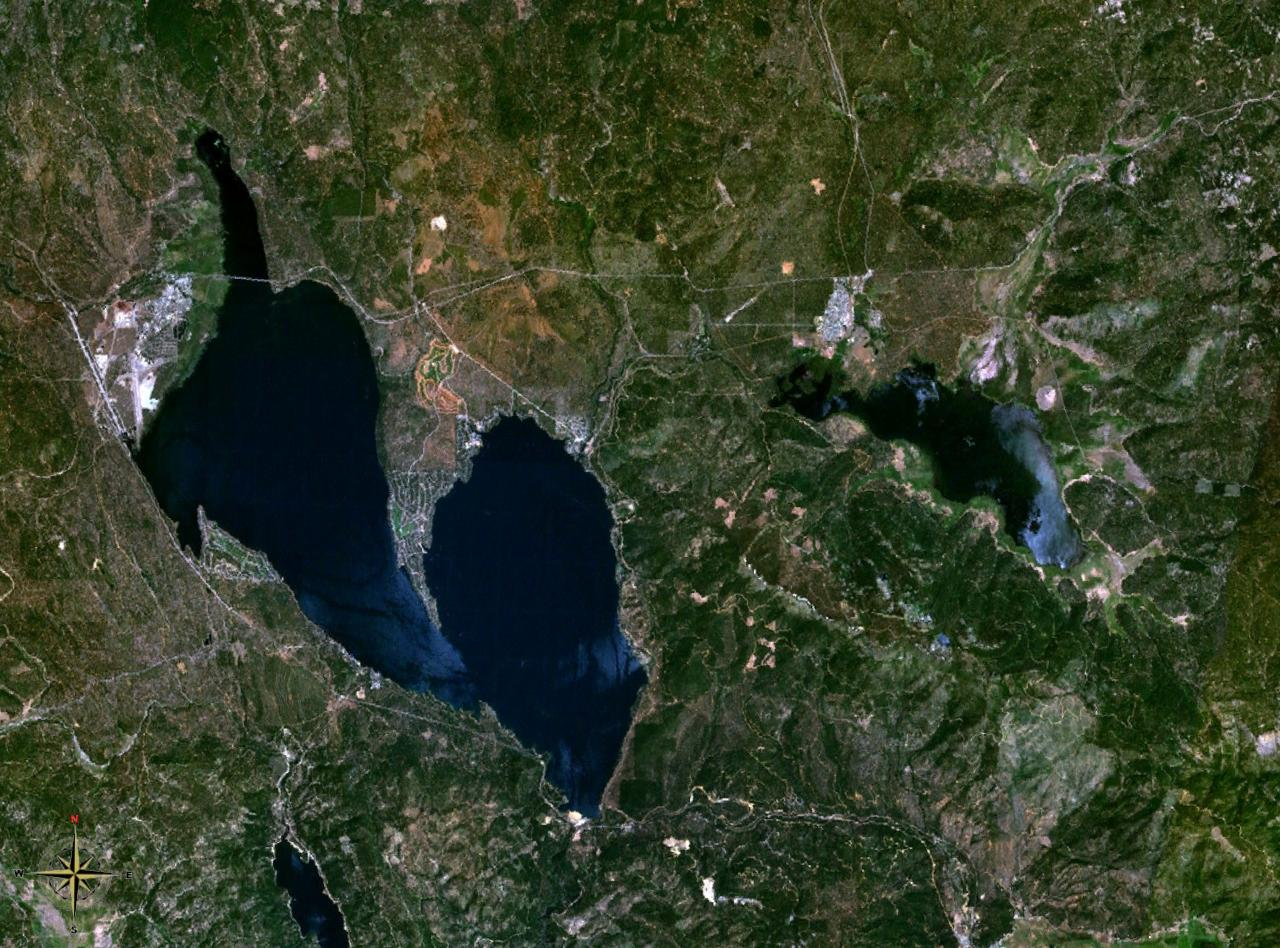
- Mountain Meadows Reservoir can be seen at right in this satellite image. Lake Almanor at left.

- Location within California Location within the United States
- Location: Lassen County, California
- Coordinates: 40°16′11″N 120°57′38″W
- Type: reservoir
- Primary outflows: Hamilton Creek
- Catchment area: 163.1 square miles (422 km^{2})
- Basin countries: United States
- Max. length: 5 miles (8.0 km)
- Max. width: 2 miles (3.2 km)
- Surface area: 5,800 acres (2,300 ha)
- Water volume: 24,800 acre-feet (30,600,000 m^{3})
- Surface elevation: 5,046 feet (1,538 m)
- Settlements: Westwood, California

Mountain Meadows Reservoir is an artificial lake, located in Lassen County, California. The lake is also known as Walker Lake. Its waters are impounded by the Indian Ole Dam, which was completed in 1924 (102 years ago).

== Hydrology ==
The lake is fed by Robbers Creek, Goodrich Creek, Duffy Creek, Cottonwood Creek, Mountain Meadows Creek, Greenville Creek, and Deerheart Creek. It discharges into Hamilton Creek, which feeds Lake Almanor.

== Indian Ole Dam ==
Indian Ole Dam is a flashboard and buttress dam, it is 264 feet (80 m) long and 26 feet (7.9 m) high, with 8 feet (2.4 m) of freeboard. Pacific Gas and Electric Company owns the dam and manages the surrounding lands.

== History ==
Cultural remnants of both the American pioneers and the Maidu exist near the reservoir and other sites are believed to exist beneath its waters.

As of September 13, 2015, the reservoir was completely dry, resulting in the death of perhaps thousands of fish.

== Recreation ==
Recreational uses of the lake include duck hunting, bird watching, fishing, and ice-skating. Near the dam there is a boat ramp, which is accessible by way of a County-maintained gravel road.

== See also ==
- List of dams and reservoirs in California
- List of lakes in California
- Moonlight Fire
