= Almanor, California =

Almanor
- Unincorporated Community; Census Designated Place
- Location in Plumas County and the state of California

- Location in the United States
- Coordinates: 40°13′1″N 121°10′38″W
- Country: United States
- State: California
- County: Plumas

Area
  - Total: 0.88 sq mi (2.29 km^{2})
  - Land: 0.88 sq mi (2.29 km^{2})
  - Water: 0 sq mi (0.00 km^{2}) 0%
- Elevation: 4,554 ft (1,388 m)

Population (2020)
  - Total: 3
  - Density: 3.4/sq mi (1.31/km^{2})
- Time zone: UTC-8 (Pacific (PST))
  - Summer (DST): UTC-7 (PDT)
- ZIP code: 95947
- Area codes: 530, 837
- FIPS code: 06-01094
- GNIS feature IDs: 256193; 2407722

Almanor (formerly, Plumas Pines) is a census-designated place (CDP) in Plumas County, California, United States. The population was 0 at the 2010 Census, but as of 2020, the population was reported as 3. Almanor is located 7 miles (11.3 km) south-southeast of Chester.

== History ==
The name comes from three daughters of Guy C. Earl, president of the Great Western Power Co.: "Alice", "Martha", and "Elinor". The Almanor post office opened in 1926.

== Geography ==
Almanor is located at 40°13′1″N 121°10′38″W (40.216857, -121.177325), on the south-western shoreline of Lake Almanor.

According to the United States Census Bureau, the CDP has a total area of 0.9 square miles (2.3 km^{2}), all land.

== Demographics ==
Historical population
Census	Pop.	Note	%±
2000	0		—
2010	0		—
2020	3		—
U.S. Decennial Census; 1860–1870 1880-1890; 1900 1910 1920; 1930 1940 1950; 1960 1970 1980; 1990 2000 2010

=== Racial and ethnic composition ===
Almanor CDP, California – Racial and ethnic composition Note: the US Census treats Hispanic/Latino as an ethnic category. This table excludes Latinos from the racial categories and assigns them to a separate category. Hispanics/Latinos may be of any race.
Race / Ethnicity (NH = Non-Hispanic)	Pop 2000	Pop 2010	Pop 2020	% 2000	% 2010	% 2020
White alone (NH)	0	0	0	0.00%	0.00%	0.00%
Black or African American alone (NH)	0	0	0	0.00%	0.00%	0.00%
Native American or Alaska Native alone (NH)	0	0	0	0.00%	0.00%	0.00%
Asian alone (NH)	0	0	0	0.00%	0.00%	0.00%
Pacific Islander alone (NH)	0	0	1	0.00%	0.00%	33.33%
Other Race alone (NH)	0	0	0	0.00%	0.00%	0.00%
Mixed race or Multiracial (NH)	0	0	0	0.00%	0.00%	0.00%
Hispanic or Latino (any race)	0	0	2	0.00%	0.00%	66.67%
Total	0	0	3	100.00%	100.00%	100.00%

=== 2020 census ===
As of the 2020 census, Almanor had a population of 3. The median age was 59.5 years. 0.0% of residents were under the age of 18 and 0.0% of residents were 65 years of age or older. For every 100 females there were 50.0 males, and for every 100 females age 18 and over there were 50.0 males age 18 and over.

0.0% of residents lived in urban areas, while 100.0% lived in rural areas.

Almanor had 1 household, and it did not include children under the age of 18. The household was headed by a male householder with no spouse or partner present. There were no one-person households, including anyone living alone who was 65 years of age or older.

There were 72 housing units, of which 98.6% were vacant. The single occupied housing unit was owner-occupied. There were no renter-occupied units. The homeowner vacancy rate was 0.0% and the rental vacancy rate was 100.0%.

=== 2010 census ===
As of the 2010 Census, there were no people living in the CDP.

=== 2000 census ===
Almanor was first listed as a census designated place in the 2000 U.S. census with 74 housing units although with zero population.

== Education ==
The school district is Plumas Unified School District.
