= Canyon Dam (California) =

Dam in California, United States

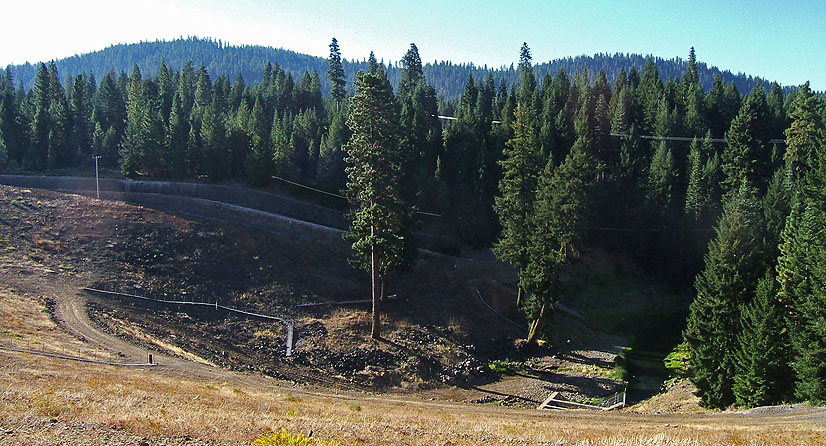
- Spillway of Canyon Dam

- Location within California
- Country: United States
- Location: Plumas County, near Westwood, California
- Coordinates: 40°10′24″N 121°05′25″W
- Opening date: 1927; 99 years ago
- Owner: PG&E

Dam and spillways
- Type of dam: Earthfill
- Impounds: North Fork Feather River
- Height: 130 ft (40 m)
- Length: 1,250 ft (380 m)

Reservoir
- Creates: Lake Almanor
- Total capacity: 1,308,000 acre⋅ft (1.613×10^{9} m^{3})
- Catchment area: 503 mi^{2} (1,300 km^{2})
- Surface area: 28,160 acres (11,400 ha)

Power Station
- Hydraulic head: 356 ft (109 m)
- Installed capacity: 41 MW
- Annual generation: 156,100,000 KWh

Canyon Dam (National ID # CA00327m also known as Lake Almanor Dam) is an embankment dam on the North Fork Feather River in northern California, 16 mi (26 km) southwest of Westwood. Located about 8 miles (13 km) southeast of Chester, the dam forms Lake Almanor, a large and shallow reservoir surrounded by the Cascade mountains.

First constructed in 1910 by the Great Western Power Company as part of the Upper North Fork Feather River Project, the dam was originally planned to be built of masonry but was later changed to an earthfill design. The dam's primary purpose was to store water for the Western Canal Company, an irrigation district in the Central Valley and a subsidiary of Great Western. The dam provided flows for a hydroelectric plant about 40 miles (64 km) downstream at the Big Bend Powerhouse, today submerged by the reservoir behind Oroville Dam. Canyon Dam was modified in 1927 and 1962 to increase its usable storage. Today the dam and reservoir, owned by Pacific Gas and Electric, supply water to the 41 megawatt Butt Valley Powerhouse and provide summer flow for six hydroelectric plants on the North Fork Feather River downstream.

== See also ==
- List of dams and reservoirs in California
- List of power stations in California
