= Poe Dam =

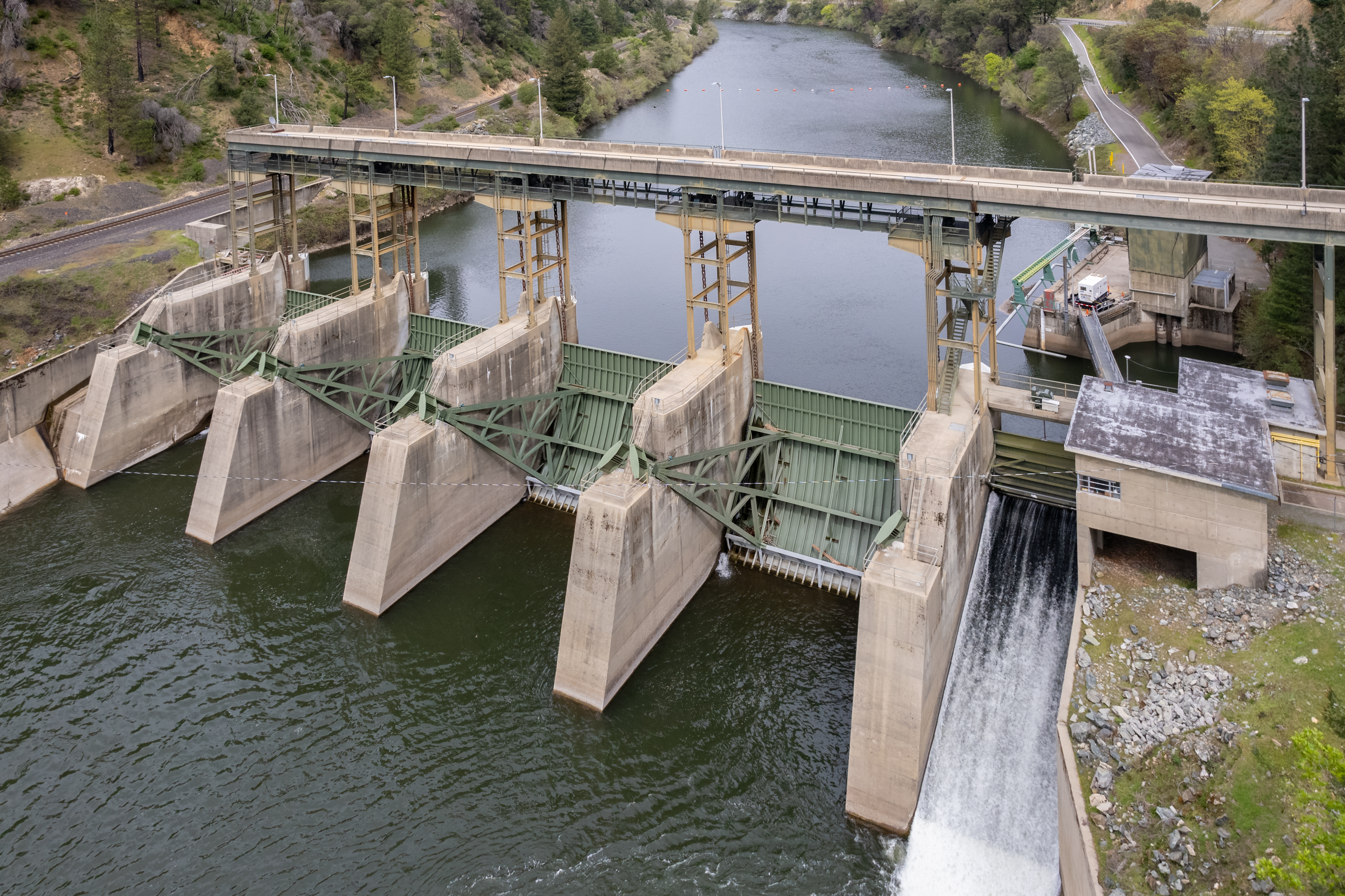
- The Poe Dam in March 2022

- Location of Poe Dam in California
- Location: Butte County, California, United States
- Coordinates: 39°48′34″N 121°25′57″W
- Opening date: 1953; 73 years ago

Dam and spillways
- Type of dam: Gated overflow dam
- Impounds: North Fork Feather River
- Height: 62 ft (19 m)
- Length: 441 ft (134 m)

Reservoir
- Total capacity: 1,150 acre⋅ft (1,420,000 m^{3})
- Catchment area: 1,950 mi^{2} (5,100 km^{2})

Power Station
- Installed capacity: 120 MW
- Annual generation: 536,397,000 KWh (2001–2012)

Poe Dam is a concrete gravity diversion dam on the North Fork Feather River, about 5 miles (8.0 km) north of Lake Oroville in Butte County, California in the United States. Completed in 1959, the dam is the lowermost component of the Pacific Gas and Electric Company's Feather River Canyon Power Project, a system of 10 hydroelectric stations along the North Fork. The dam is 60 ft (18 m) high and 440 ft (130 m) long, with water flows controlled by four 50 ft × 41 ft (15 m × 12 m) radial gates.

The dam diverts water through an 6.3-mile (10.1 km) tunnel to the 120 megawatt Poe Powerhouse, located on the upper reaches of Lake Oroville. The powerhouse has a rated hydraulic head of 477 ft (145 m), generating about 500 million kilowatt hours annually.

On November 8, 2018, the Camp Fire, a destructive wildfire that destroyed the nearby community of Concow and the town of Paradise and caused multiple deaths, originated close to Poe Dam at the location of downed power lines across the Feather River. In an initial comment, PG&E stated that a cause of the fire had not been determined yet and that there would be an investigation.

Poe Dam is a popular kayaking site.

== See also ==
- List of dams and reservoirs in California
