= Pulga, California =

Unincorporated community in California, United States

- Unincorporated community
- Location in California Pulga, California (the United States)
- Coordinates: 39°48′11″N 121°26′55″W
- Country: United States
- State: California
- County: Butte
- Elevation: 1,398 ft (426 m)

Pulga is an unincorporated community in Butte County, California, United States. It is located along the west slope of the Feather River canyon. A variant name for the community is Big Bar.

== History ==
The land was once inhabited by Konkow Maidu tribes. In 1885, the town of Pulga was founded by William King, a sawmill owner and railroad geologist. A post office was opened in 1906. The area had attracted gold miners and miners of vesuvianite, also known as "Pulga Jade". The town was always small, and peaked in size in the 1930s and 1940s with a few hundred people. The Western Pacific Railroad's Feather River Route line ran through the town and offered Vista Dome cars, designed and built with the scenery on this route in mind. By the late-1960s, this was no longer a train route and the mining business had dried up.

In 1994, the William King estate sold the town property, on which the Mystic Valley Retreat and School of Hypnotism was erected; most of the buildings have fallen into disrepair.

In 2015, the 64-acre (26 ha) town was purchased by Betsy Ann Cowley. Crowley opened it as a feminist artist retreat and event venue, also named Pulga.

In 2018, high tension lines near the Poe Dam, north of Pulga, were the cause of the Camp Fire. Two buildings in Pulga were destroyed and others were damaged.

== Geography ==
Pulga is at the mouth of Flea Valley Creek, which gives rise to the toponym.

A Union Pacific Railroad passes through the settlement.

== See also ==
- Pulga Bridges
