= Prattville, California =

Prattville
- Unincorporated Community; Census Designated Place
- Location in Plumas County and the state of California

- Location in the United States
- Coordinates: 40°12′29″N 121°9′24″W
- Country: United States
- State: California
- County: Plumas

Area
  - Total: 0.603 sq mi (1.562 km^{2})
  - Land: 0.603 sq mi (1.562 km^{2})
  - Water: 0 sq mi (0 km^{2}) 0%
- Elevation: 4,534 ft (1,382 m)

Population (2020)
  - Total: 24
  - Density: 40/sq mi (15/km^{2})
- Time zone: UTC-8 (Pacific (PST))
  - Summer (DST): UTC-7 (PDT)
- ZIP code: 95923
- Area code: 530
- FIPS code: 06-58618
- GNIS feature ID: 0265028

Prattville is a census-designated place (CDP) in Plumas County, California, United States. The population was 24 at the 2020 census, down from 33 at the 2010 census.

== Geography ==
Prattville is located at 40°12′29″N 121°9′24″W (40.208022, -121.156603).

According to the United States Census Bureau, the CDP has a total area of 0.6 square miles (1.6 km^{2}), all land.

== Demographics ==
Historical population
Census	Pop.	Note	%±
2000	28		—
2010	33		17.9%
2020	24		−27.3%
U.S. Decennial Census; 1860–1870 1880-1890; 1900 1910 1920; 1930 1940 1950; 1960 1970 1980; 1990 2000 2010

Prattville first appeared as a census designated place in the 2000 U.S. census.

=== 2020 ===
Prattville CDP, California – Racial and ethnic composition Note: the US Census treats Hispanic/Latino as an ethnic category. This table excludes Latinos from the racial categories and assigns them to a separate category. Hispanics/Latinos may be of any race.
Race / Ethnicity (NH = Non-Hispanic)	Pop 2000	Pop 2010	Pop 2020	% 2000	% 2010	% 2020
White alone (NH)	28	33	22	100.00%	100.00%	91.67%
Black or African American alone (NH)	0	0	0	0.00%	0.00%	0.00%
Native American or Alaska Native alone (NH)	0	0	0	0.00%	0.00%	0.00%
Asian alone (NH)	0	0	0	0.00%	0.00%	0.00%
Native Hawaiian or Pacific Islander alone (NH)	0	0	1	0.00%	0.00%	4.17%
Other race alone (NH)	0	0	0	0.00%	0.00%	0.00%
Mixed race or Multiracial (NH)	0	0	1	0.00%	0.00%	4.17%
Hispanic or Latino (any race)	0	0	0	0.00%	0.00%	0.00%
Total	28	33	24	100.00%	100.00%	100.00%

The 2020 United States census reported that Prattville had a population of 24. The population density was 39.8 inhabitants per square mile (15.4/km^{2}). The racial makeup of Prattville was 22 (92%) White, 1 (4%) Pacific Islander, and 1 (4%) from two or more races. No residents were Hispanic or Latino.

There were 8 households, and the average household size was 3.0. The median age was 66.8 years.

There were 101 housing units at an average density of 167.5 units per square mile (64.7 units/km^{2}), of which 8 (8%) were occupied year round and 86 (85%) were used seasonally.

At the 2000 census, the median household income was $70,313 and the median family income was $71,250. Males had a median income of $71,250 versus $36,250 for females. The per capita income for the CDP was $37,786. None of the population and none of the families were below the poverty line.

== Politics ==
In the state legislature, Prattville is in the 1st senatorial district, represented by Republican Megan Dahle, and the 1st Assembly district, represented by Republican Heather Hadwick.

Federally, Prattville is in California's 3rd congressional district, represented by Independent Kevin Kiley.

== Education ==
The school district is Plumas Unified School District.
