= Butte Meadows, California =

Butte Meadows
- census-designated place
- Location of Butte Meadows in Butte County, California.

- Location in California
- Coordinates: 40°04′53″N 121°33′04″W
- Country: United States
- State: California
- County: Butte

Area
  - Total: 2.15 sq mi (5.56 km^{2})
  - Land: 2.14 sq mi (5.55 km^{2})
  - Water: 0 sq mi (0.00 km^{2}) 0.02%
- Elevation: 4,341 ft (1,323 m)

Population (2020)
  - Total: 74
  - Density: 34.5/sq mi (13.32/km^{2})
- Time zone: UTC-8 (Pacific (PST))
  - Summer (DST): UTC-7 (PDT)
- Area codes: 530, 837
- GNIS feature IDs: 257772; 2612474

Butte Meadows is a census-designated place in Butte County, California, United States, five miles off State Route 32 on Humboldt Road. The area is about 45 minutes or 33 miles (53 km) east of Chico on SR32. Its elevation is listed at 4,340 feet (1,323 m) above sea level: certain to get snow in winter of any year. The area code is Area code 530. The area is just over one mile (1.6 km) from the Tehama County line. The post office that served Butte Meadows moved back and forth across the county line several times from 1878 to 1888. Butte Meadows' population was 74 at the 2020 census.

== Demographics ==
Historical population
Census	Pop.	Note	%±
2010	40		—
2020	74		85.0%
U.S. Decennial Census; 2010

=== 2020 census ===
As of the 2020 census, Butte Meadows had a population of 74. The population density was 34.5 inhabitants per square mile (13.3/km^{2}). The median age was 40.3 years. 12.2% of residents were under the age of 18, 13.5% were aged 18 to 24, 31.1% were aged 25 to 44, 14.9% were aged 45 to 64, and 28.4% of residents were 65 years of age or older. For every 100 females there were 105.6 males, and for every 100 females age 18 and over there were 109.7 males age 18 and over.

0.0% of residents lived in urban areas, while 100.0% lived in rural areas.

There were 38 households in Butte Meadows, of which 31.6% had children under the age of 18 living in them. Of all households, 55.3% were married-couple households, 15.8% were cohabiting couple households, 13.2% were households with a male householder and no spouse or partner present, and 15.8% were households with a female householder and no spouse or partner present. About 15.8% of all households were made up of individuals and 10.5% had someone living alone who was 65 years of age or older. The average household size was 1.95. There were 27 families (71.1% of all households).

There were 213 housing units at an average density of 99.3 units per square mile (38.3 units/km^{2}), of which 38 (17.8%) were occupied and 82.2% were vacant. Of occupied units, 78.9% were owner-occupied and 21.1% were renter-occupied. The homeowner vacancy rate was 0.0% and the rental vacancy rate was 0.0%.

Racial composition as of the 2020 census
Race	Number	Percent
White	55	74.3%
Black or African American	2	2.7%
American Indian and Alaska Native	2	2.7%
Asian	1	1.4%
Native Hawaiian and Other Pacific Islander	0	0.0%
Some other race	8	10.8%
Two or more races	6	8.1%
Hispanic or Latino (of any race)	14	18.9%

=== 2010 census ===
Butte Meadows first appeared as a census designated place in the 2010 U.S. census.

== Education ==
Butte Meadows is served by the Paradise Unified School District.

== See also ==
- Chester, California
- Humboldt Wagon Road
- Plumas National Forest
- Lassen National Forest
- Plumas County, California
