= Pack Fire =

2025 California wildfire

- Part of the 2025 California wildfires
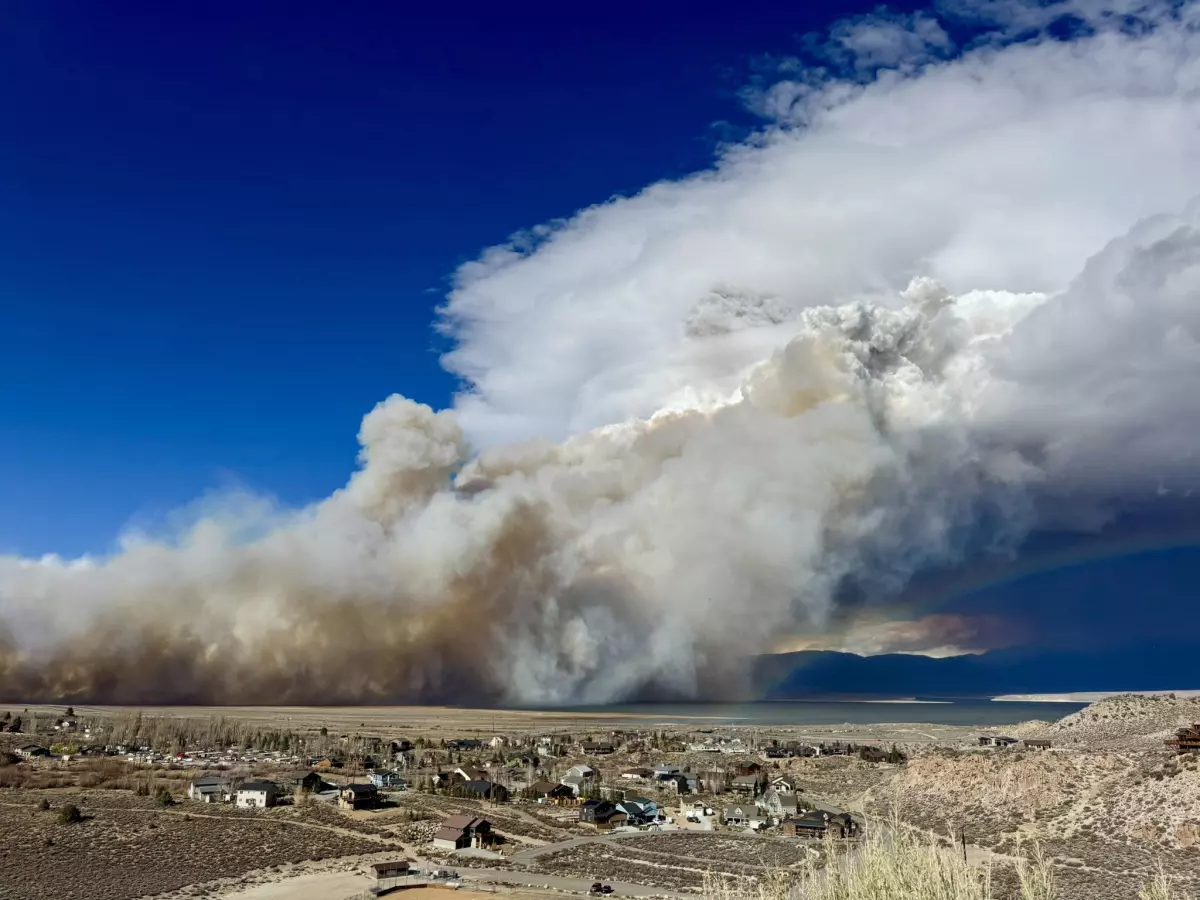
- The Pack Fire viewed on November 13
- Date: November 13 –; December 3, 2025 (20 days)
- Location: McGee Creek, Mono County, California
- Coordinates: 37.562°N 118.788°W

Statistics
- Perimeter: 100% contained
- Burned area: 1,974 acres (799 ha; 3.084 sq mi)

Impacts
- Deaths: 0
- Injuries: 0
- Evacuated: About 1,800 people
- Structures destroyed: 30 destroyed 6 damaged
- Cost: $4.97 million (2025 USD)

Ignition
- Cause: Under investigation

Map
- General location of the Pack Fire

The Pack Fire was a wildfire that burned in Mono County, California, United States. After igniting on November 13, 2025, the blaze quickly spread, driven by winds gusting over 50 miles per hour (80 km/h) resulting from an atmospheric river passing nearby. Rain from a storm passing through the state helped firefighters gain control the fire. Over 1,800 people were evacuated at the peak of the fire that destroyed thirty structures and damaged six others. The fire reached 100% containment on December 3, at a size of 1,974 acres (799 ha; 3.084 sq mi).

== Background ==
The southern Sierra Nevada in California laid in the outer bands of a low-pressure area over the Pacific Ocean, off the coasts of California and Oregon, with pressure levels between 1012 and 1016 millibars. A warm front over the Pacific Ocean was pushing east near the coast of Central and Southern California.

Strong winds over 50 miles per hour (80 km/h) contributed to the Pack Fire's rapid spread, as well as grounding aerial suppression planes. The winds were a result of an atmospheric river moving throughout the area. However, a storm passing through the state brought moisture that helped firefighters control the Pack Fire.

== Cause ==
The Pack Fire ignited around 11:15 am on November 13. The cause if under investigation, with the investigation led by personnel of Inyo National Forest. A smaller, less-documented fire started in the same area as the Pack Fire roughly 12 hours earlier. However, the fires are viewed as separate incidents.

== Progression ==
After starting around 11:15 am on November 13 originally reported at 10 acres (4.0 ha), evacuations were ordered in the Long Valley Caldera and Crowley Lake areas. Evacuation warnings were issued in and near Aspen Springs, Hilton Creek, Convict Lake, and Sunny Slopes. U.S. Route 395 was closed in both directions, and Benton Crossing Road briefly closed. While the evacuation order was downgraded to a warning at 8 pm near Crowley Lake, the Pack Fire had grown to approximately 3,400 acres (1,400 ha). Escorts were available along northbound and southbound U.S. 395. Precipitation significantly decreased fire activity. An McGee Creek RV Park was impacted, and fifteen structures had been damaged. Damage assessments remained ongoing into the next morning as the estimated size was lowered to 3,000 acres (1,200 ha) and containment increased to 5%. Fifteen structures were confirmed destroyed. A storm began moving through the Eastern Sierra Nevada, bringing possible moisture, despite strong wind gusting up to 50 miles per hour (80 km/h) complicating suppression efforts.

By November 15, rain continued to fall over the burn area with snow nearby, and containment increased to 32%. Evacuation centers were closed. U.S. 395 reopened. Twenty-eight structures were destroyed, including about fifteen residential structures in McGee Creek RV Park, and five others were damaged. Fire activity decreased as temperatures decreased and humidity levels rose overnight with fire activity limited to smoldering in heavy fuel. Containment increased to 69% on November 16 while size decreased to 1,974 acres (799 ha). All evacuation orders were lifted. An evacuation warning remained in areas within the fire perimeter.

All evacuation warnings were lifted on November 18, and containment increased to 96% the next day. Crowley Town Hall hosted a meeting discussing the possible cause of the fire on November 20. A local assistance center operated at Crowley Lake Community Center on November 21 to support residents impacted by the fire.

The fire reached 100% containment on December 3.

== Effects ==
Thirty structures were destroyed by the Pack Fire, including about six homes in a mobile home park. Six other structures were damaged. Several vehicles left behind by evacuees were either destroyed or heavily damaged. The fire has cost about $4.97 million in suppression efforts. Several state and county agencies are providing free recovery resources.

Evacuations were ordered near McGee Creek and Crowley Lake on November 13, with evacuation warnings prompted in Aspen Springs, Hilton Creek, Convict Lake, and Sunny Slopes. The final evacuation warnings within the fire's perimeter were lifted on November 18. At the fire's peak, over 1,800 people were under evacuation orders. U.S. 395 was closed from Tom's Place to Benton Crossing Road. Until February 28, 2026, portions of Inyo National Forest will be closed.

== Growth and containment table ==
Fire containment status Gray: contained; Red: active; %: percent contained;
Date	Area	Personnel	Containment
November 13	3,400 acres (1,400 ha)	368	
November 14	3,000 acres (1,200 ha)	675	
November 15	3,000 acres (1,200 ha)	675	
November 16	3,000 acres (1,200 ha)	795	
November 17	1,974 acres (799 ha)	614	
November 18-19	1,974 acres (799 ha)	614	
December 3	1,974 acres		100%

== Gallery ==
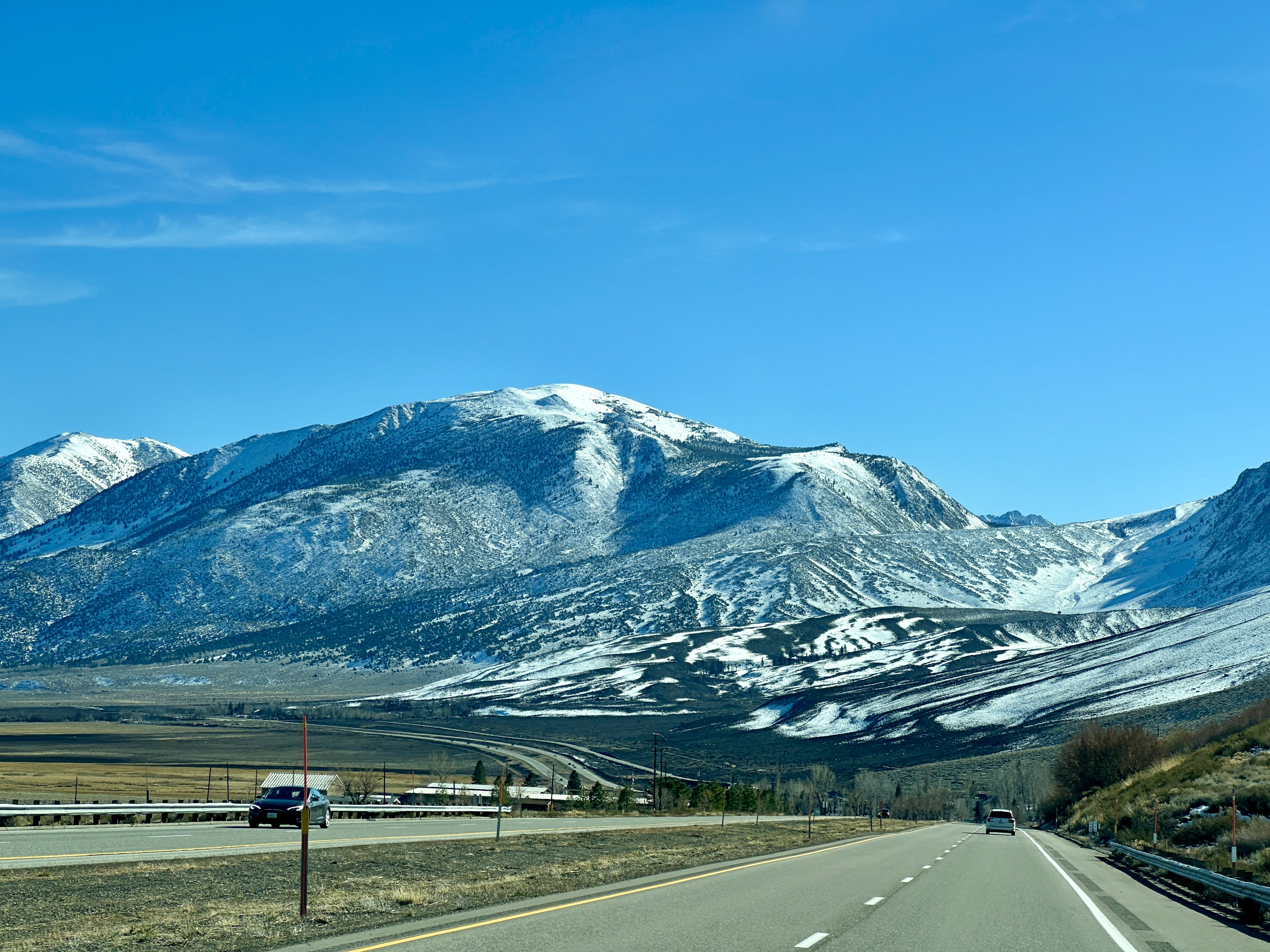
Burn scar from the fire, focusing on where it jumped US 395, viewed on the left

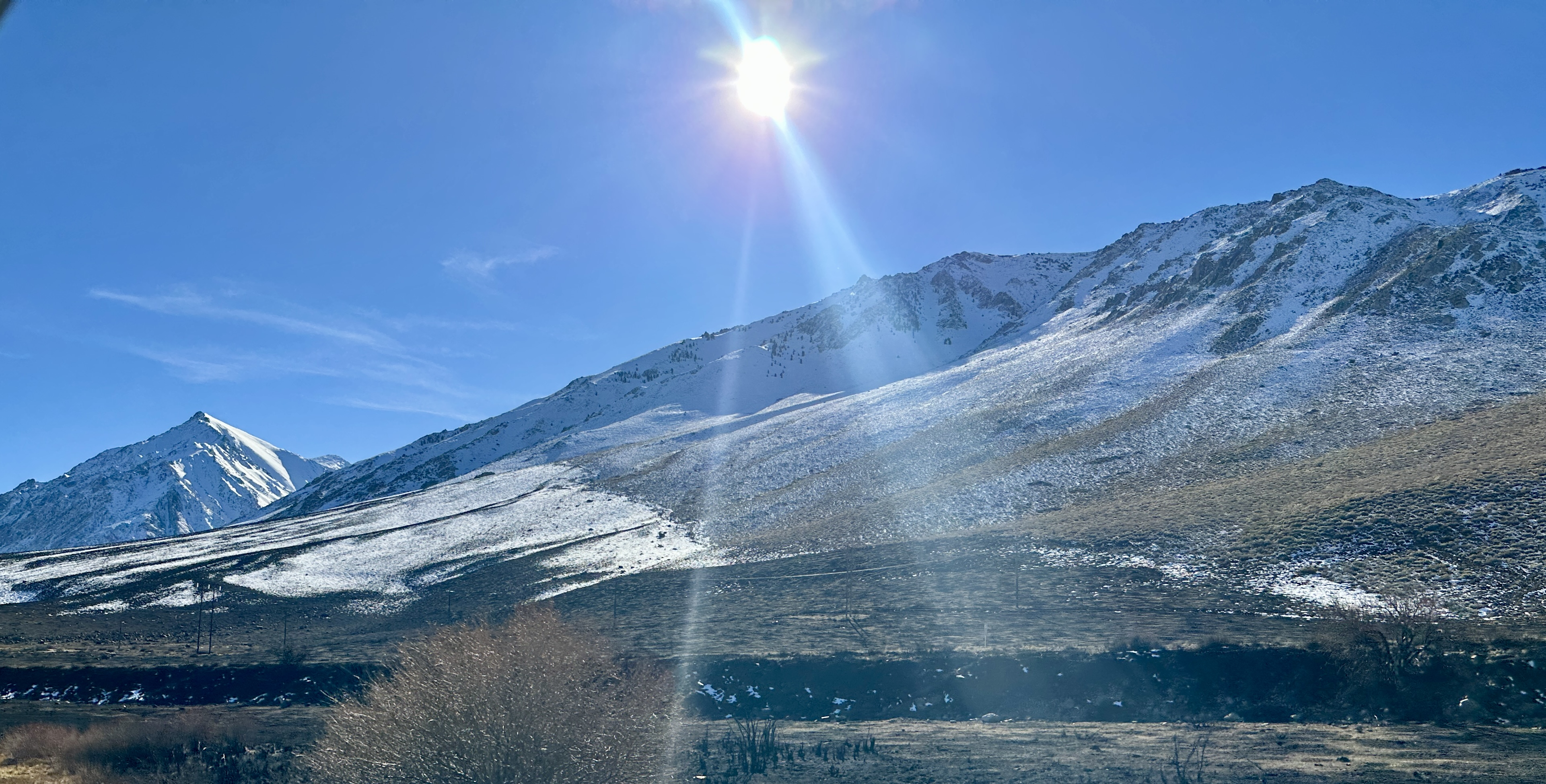
Burned hill from where the fire spread along US 395

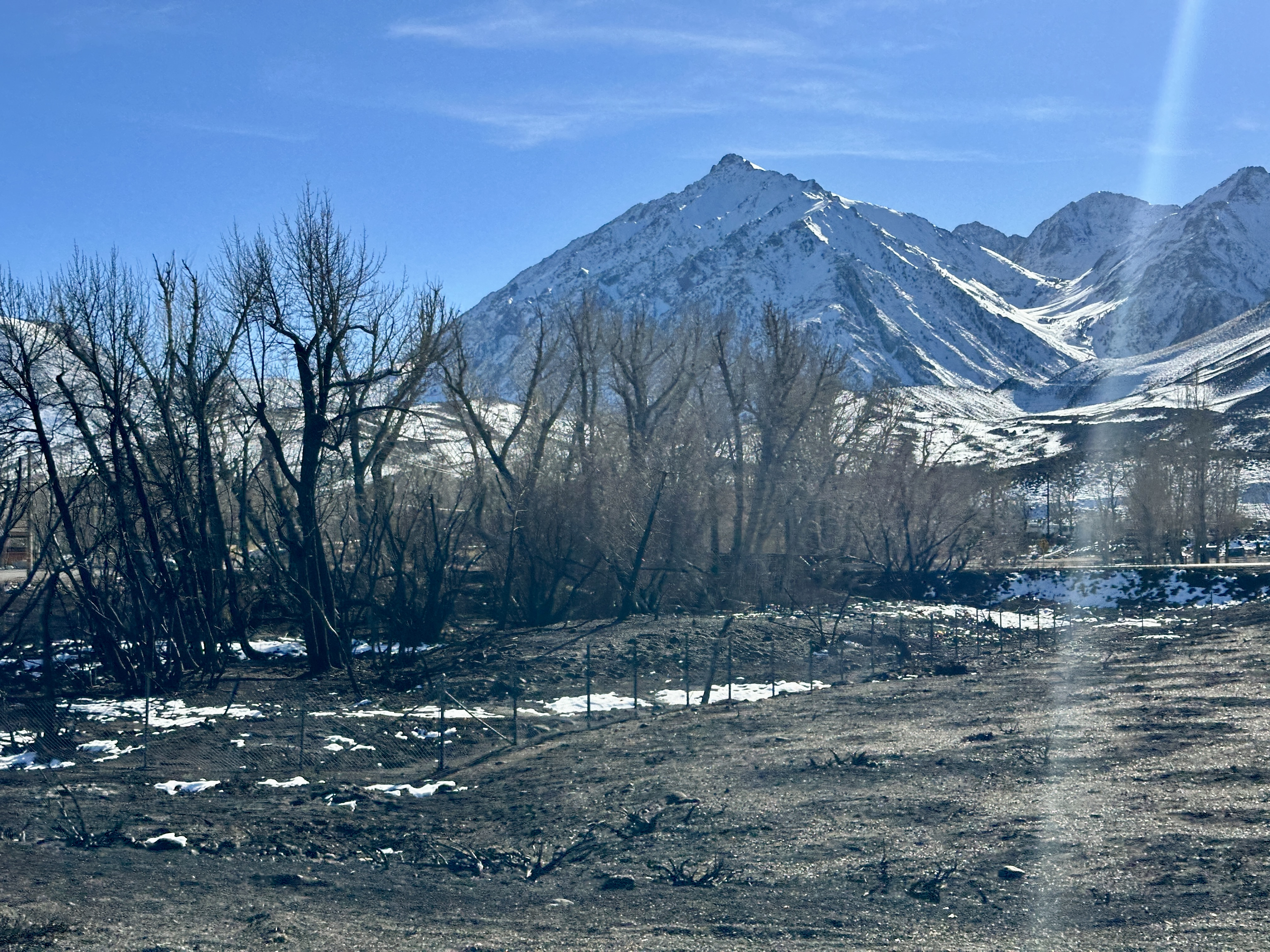
Burned trees further down southbound US 395

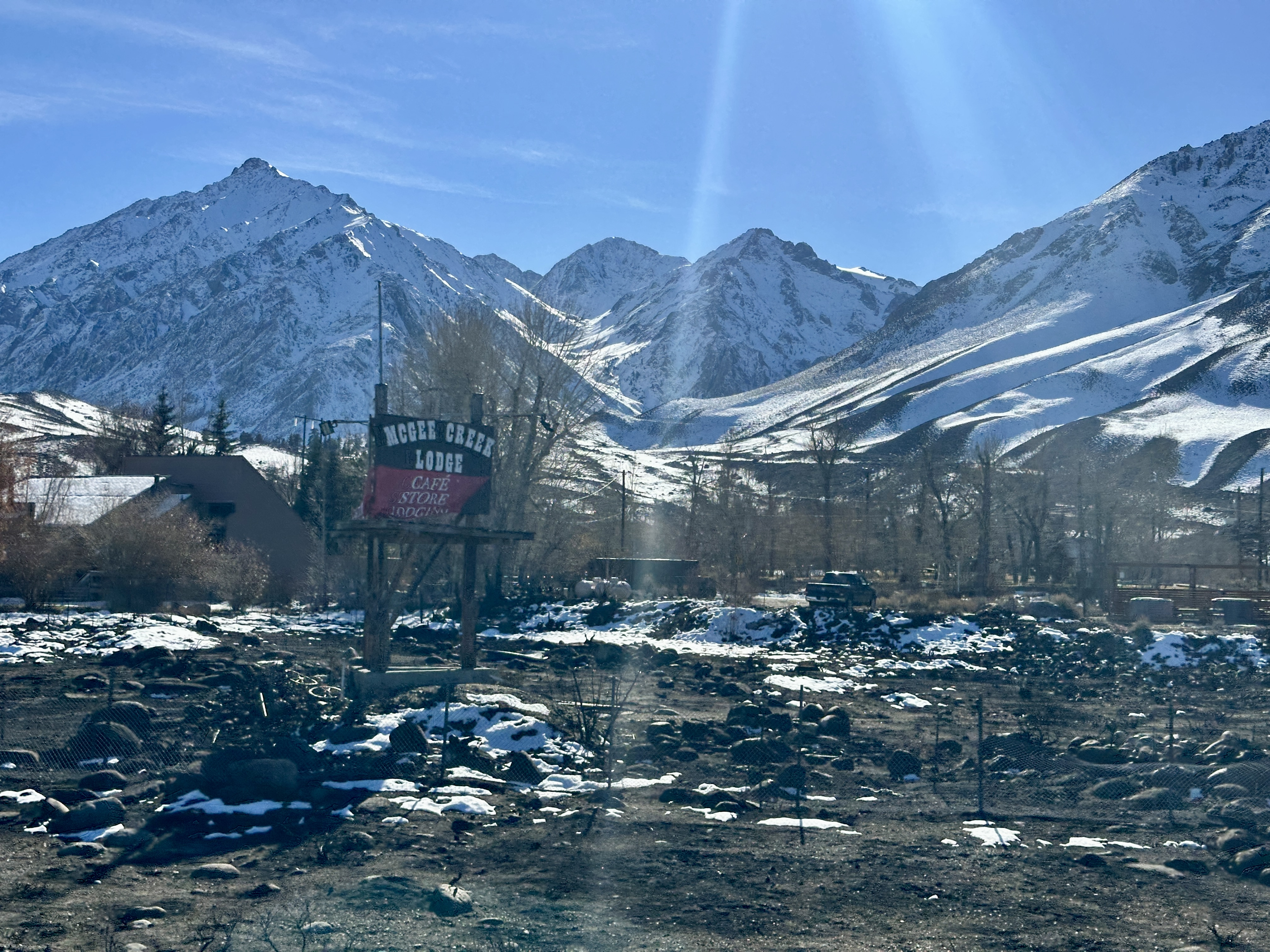
Burned area near the Pack Fire's ignition point, near McGee Creek Campground

== See also ==
- 2025 United States wildfires
- Lion Fire
- List of California wildfires
