= Paradise, Mono County, California =

Paradise
- Census-designated place
- Location in Mono County and the state of California

- Location within California Location within the United States
- Coordinates: 37°29′58″N 118°36′16″W
- Country: United States
- State: California
- County: Mono

Area
  - Total: 4.352 sq mi (11.272 km^{2})
  - Land: 4.352 sq mi (11.272 km^{2})
  - Water: 0 sq mi (0 km^{2})
- Elevation: 5,230 ft (1,590 m)

Population (2020)
  - Total: 174
  - Density: 40.0/sq mi (15.4/km^{2})
- Time zone: UTC-8 (Pacific (PST))
  - Summer (DST): UTC-7 (PDT)
- ZIP Code: 93514 (Bishop)
- Area codes: 760; 442
- GNIS feature ID: 2583105

Paradise is an unincorporated community and census-designated place (CDP) that is the southernmost community in Mono County, California, United States. The population was 174 at the 2020 census.

== Geography ==
Located in the southwestern part of the county, Paradise functions as a bedroom community for workers in Bishop, (15 miles (24 km) to the southeast) and Mammoth Lakes, (26 miles (42 km) to the northwest), and as a home for retirees. Geographically, it sits near the bottom of the Sherwin Grade, which divides Round Valley in Inyo County from Long Valley in Mono County. Neighboring communities include Wheeler Crest to the west, Swall Meadows and Pinon Ranch to the north.

According to the United States Census Bureau, the CDP covers an area of 4.4 square miles (11 km^{2}), all land.

== Demographics ==
Historical population
| Census | Pop. | Note | %± |
|---|---|---|---|
| 2010 | 153 | | — |
| 2020 | 174 | | 13.7% |
U.S. Decennial Census; 2000 2010

Paradise first appeared as a census designated place in the 2010 U.S. census.

=== 2020 ===
The 2020 United States census reported that Paradise had a population of 174. The population density was 40.0 inhabitants per square mile (15.4/km^{2}). The racial makeup of Paradise was 142 (81.6%) White, 0 (0.0%) African American, 4 (2.3%) Native American, 2 (1.1%) Asian, 0 (0.0%) Pacific Islander, 3 (1.7%) from other races, and 23 (13.2%) from two or more races. Hispanic or Latino of any race were 15 persons (8.6%).

The whole population lived in households. There were 84 households, out of which 22 (26.2%) had children under the age of 18 living in them, 51 (60.7%) were married-couple households, 5 (6.0%) were cohabiting couple households, 13 (15.5%) had a female householder with no partner present, and 15 (17.9%) had a male householder with no partner present. 16 households (19.0%) were one person, and 10 (11.9%) were one person aged 65 or older. The average household size was 2.07. There were 63 families (75.0% of all households).

The age distribution was 21 people (12.1%) under the age of 18, 7 people (4.0%) aged 18 to 24, 21 people (12.1%) aged 25 to 44, 51 people (29.3%) aged 45 to 64, and 74 people (42.5%) who were 65 years of age or older. The median age was 59.6 years. There were 96 males and 78 females.

There were 104 housing units at an average density of 23.9 units per square mile (9.2 units/km^{2}), of which 84 (80.8%) were occupied. Of these, 83 (98.8%) were owner-occupied, and 1 (1.2%) were occupied by renters.

=== 2010 ===
The 2010 United States census reported that Paradise had a population of 153. The population density was 35.2 inhabitants per square mile (13.6/km^{2}). The racial makeup of Paradise was 130 (85.0%) White, 0 (0.0%) African American, 2 (1.3%) Native American, 6 (3.9%) Asian, 0 (0.0%) Pacific Islander, 5 (3.3%) from other races, and 10 (6.5%) from two or more races. Hispanic or Latino of any race were 14 persons (9.2%).

The Census reported that 153 people (100% of the population) lived in households, 0 (0%) lived in non-institutionalized group quarters, and 0 (0%) were institutionalized.

There were 74 households, out of which 11 (14.9%) had children under the age of 18 living in them, 49 (66.2%) were opposite-sex married couples living together, 2 (2.7%) had a female householder with no husband present, 0 (0%) had a male householder with no wife present. There were 2 (2.7%) unmarried opposite-sex partnerships, and 1 (1.4%) same-sex married couples or partnerships. 20 households (27.0%) were made up of individuals, and 10 (13.5%) had someone living alone who was 65 years of age or older. The average household size was 2.07. There were 51 families (68.9% of all households); the average family size was 2.47.

The population was spread out, with 19 people (12.4%) under the age of 18, 2 people (1.3%) aged 18 to 24, 23 people (15.0%) aged 25 to 44, 76 people (49.7%) aged 45 to 64, and 33 people (21.6%) who were 65 years of age or older. The median age was 52.9 years. For every 100 females, there were 104.0 males. For every 100 females age 18 and over, there were 97.1 males.

There were 87 housing units at an average density of 20.0 per square mile (7.7/km^{2}), of which 71 (95.9%) were owner-occupied, and 3 (4.1%) were occupied by renters. The homeowner vacancy rate was 1.4%; the rental vacancy rate was 25.0%. 149 people (97.4% of the population) lived in owner-occupied housing units and 4 people (2.6%) lived in rental housing units.

=== 2000 ===
The 2000 United States Census reported the population of Paradise to be 124. For 2003, the California Department of Finance estimated the population to be 126. In 2000, 2% of the population was under 5 years old, 6% were from 5 to 17, 64% were from 18 to 64, and 28% were over 65. The median age was 57. Paradise's percentage of seniors and median age both exceeded the county averages. Eighty-six percent of the households were owner occupied and 14% were rented. Sixty percent of Paradise's 132 lots have been developed, and there are current plans to 53 luxury homes on one undeveloped parcel.

== Tourism ==
There is a commercial tourist industry in Paradise. The Paradise Lodge is a designated rural resort that contains 17 cabins and a restaurant.

== Fire Protection District ==
Paradise is the seat of the Paradise Fire Protection District, which was established in 1982. The fire protection district covers an area of approximately 1 square mile (2.6 km^{2}) and includes areas adjacent to Paradise, such that the fire district's population was 170.

== Education ==
The CDP is served by the Round Valley Joint Elementary School District and the Bishop Unified School District for grades 9-12 only.

Previously, the Bishop USD 9-12 area was in the Bishop Joint Union High School District.
