= 2011 California wildfires =

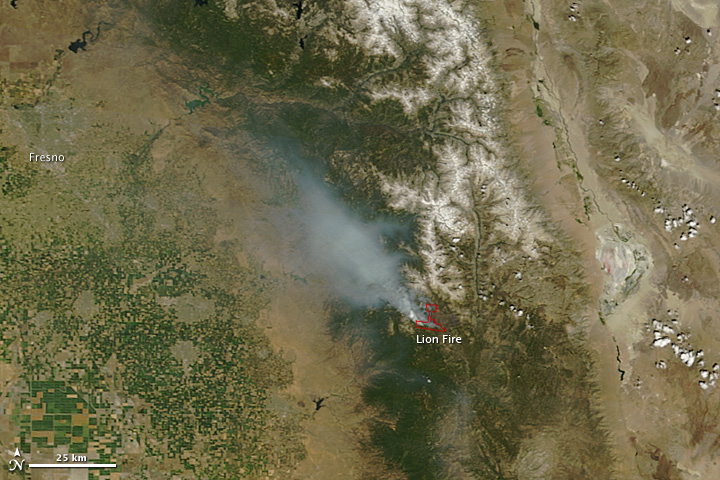
- MODIS satellite image of the Lion Fire from space, on July 29, 2011

Statistics
- Total fires: 7,989
- Total area: 168,545 acres (682.08 km^{2})

Impacts
- Deaths: None reported
- Injuries: None reported
- Cost: >$138.2 million (2011 USD)

There were 7,989 fires that burned 168,545 acres (682.08 km^{2}) of land in the US state of California during 2011.

== Background ==
The timing of "fire season" in California is variable, depending on the amount of prior winter and spring precipitation, the frequency and severity of weather such as heat waves and wind events, and moisture content in vegetation. Northern California typically sees wildfire activity between late spring and early fall, peaking in the summer with hotter and drier conditions. Occasional cold frontal passages can bring wind and lightning. The timing of fire season in Southern California is similar, peaking between late spring and fall. The severity and duration of peak activity in either part of the state is modulated in part by weather events: downslope/offshore wind events can lead to critical fire weather, while onshore flow and Pacific weather systems can bring conditions that hamper wildfire growth.

== List of wildfires ==
Below is a list of all fires that exceeded 1,000 acres (4.0 km^{2}) during the 2011 fire season. The list is, and all data herein, is taken from CAL FIRE's list of large fires, except where otherwise cited.

Name	County	Acres	Km^{2}	Start date	Contained Date (Note: Containment means that fire crews have established and secured control lines around the fire's perimeter. These lines are artificial barriers, like trenches or cleared vegetation, designed to stop the fire's spread, or natural barriers like rivers. Containment reflects progress in managing the fire but does not necessarily mean the fire is starved of fuel, under control, or put out.)	Notes
Cove	Kern	1,122	4.5	May 27, 2011	May 31, 2011	
Cougar	Modoc	2,000	8.1	June 8, 2011	June 13, 2011	
Antelope	Kern	5,200	21.0	June 19, 2011	June 21, 2011	2 structures destroyed
Quinn	Kern	3,154	12.8	June 21, 2011	June 22, 2011	
Stage	Tulare	1,213	4.9	June 27, 2011	July 2, 2011	
Lion	Tulare	20,500	83.0	July 8, 2011	October 10, 2011	
Scorpion Complex	Modoc	2,945	11.9	July 15, 2011	July 18, 2011	
Eagle	San Diego	14,100	57.1	July 21, 2011	July 29, 2011	
Annie	Modoc	2,076	8.4	August 18, 2011	August 21, 2011	
Motor	Mariposa	5,231	21.2	August 25, 2011	September 4, 2011	
Wells	San Bernardino	1,723	7.0	August 28, 2011	August 31, 2011	
Hill	San Bernardino	1,135	4.6	September 2, 2011	September 2, 2011	3 structures destroyed
Soda	San Luis Obispo	1,528	6.2	September 3, 2011	September 4, 2011	1 structures destroyed
Canyon	Kern	14,585	59.0	September 4, 2011	September 11, 2011	100 structures destroyed
Milton	San Joaquin	1,122	4.5	September 9, 2011	September 11, 2011	
Keene Complex	Kern	2,577	10.4	September 10, 2011	September 14, 2011	
Comanche Complex	Kern	29,338	118.7	September 10, 2011	September 14, 2011	Originated as 4 separate fires.
Breckenridge Complex	Kern	25,213	102.0	September 10, 2011	September 17, 2011	
John	Inyo	5,300	21.4	September 13, 2011	September 16, 2011	
Tamarack	Mariposa	1,011	4.1	September 13, 2011	October 17, 2011	
65 Fire	Kern	2,005	8.1	September 23, 2011	September 23, 2011	
Ruth	Trinity	1,460	5.9	September 23, 2011	September 28, 2011	31 structures destroyed
Buckeye	Mono	1,140	4.6	September 25, 2011	September 27, 2011	
Great	San Diego	2,135	8.6	October 1, 2011	October 7, 2011	
