= Paradise, California (disambiguation) =

Paradise, California is an incorporated town in Butte County, California

Paradise, California also refers to:

- Paradise, Mono County, California
- The former name of Shively, California
