= Wheeler Crest, California =

Unincorporated community in California, United States

Coordinates: 37°30′35″N 118°38′18″W

Wheeler Crest is a small residential unincorporated community in southwestern Mono County, California, United States. It functions as a bedroom community for workers in Bishop and Mammoth Lakes, and as a home for retirees. Geographically, it sits on the Sherwin Grade, which divides Round Valley in Inyo County from Long Valley in Mono County.

== Demographics ==
The 2000 United States Census reported the population of Wheeler Crest to be 196. For 2003, the California Department of Finance estimated the population to be 200. In 2000, 6% of the population was under 5 years old, 70% were from 18 to 64, and 11% were over 65. The median age was 51. Ninety-five percent of the households were owner occupied and 5% were rented. Under the current Mono County General Plan, the 116 developed parcels could be augmented by another 391 housing units.

== Fire Protection District ==
Wheeler Crest is the seat of the Wheeler Crest Fire Protection District, which was established in 1982. This District covers an area of approximately 4 square miles (10 km^{2}).
