= Crowley Lake, California =

Crowley Lake
- Census-designated place
- Location of Crowley Lake in Mono County, California.

- Position in California.
- Coordinates: 37°34′05″N 118°45′05″W
- Country: United States
- State: California
- County: Mono

Area
  - Total: 2.89 sq mi (7.48 km^{2})
  - Land: 2.89 sq mi (7.48 km^{2})
  - Water: 0.0039 sq mi (0.01 km^{2}) 0.09%
- Elevation: 6,939 ft (2,115 m)

Population (2020)
  - Total: 980
  - Density: 339.5/sq mi (131.09/km^{2})
- Time zone: UTC-8 (Pacific (PST))
  - Summer (DST): UTC-7 (PDT)
- GNIS feature ID: 2582987

Crowley Lake is a census-designated place in Mono County, California, United States. Crowley Lake sits at an elevation of 6,939 feet (2,115 m). The 2020 United States census reported Crowley Lake's population as 980.

== Geography ==
According to the United States Census Bureau, the CDP covers an area of 2.9 square miles (7.5 km^{2}), 99.91% of it land and 0.09% of it water.

== Demographics ==
Historical population
| Census | Pop. | Note | %± |
|---|---|---|---|
| 2010 | 875 | | — |
| 2020 | 980 | | 12.0% |
U.S. Decennial Census; 2000 2010

Crowley Lake first appeared as a census designated place in the 2010 U.S. census.

The 2020 United States census reported that Crowley Lake had a population of 980. The population density was 339.6 inhabitants per square mile (131.1/km^{2}). The racial makeup of Crowley Lake was 751 (76.6%) White, 5 (0.5%) African American, 4 (0.4%) Native American, 12 (1.2%) Asian, 4 (0.4%) Pacific Islander, 89 (9.1%) from other races, and 115 (11.7%) from two or more races. Hispanic or Latino of any race were 182 persons (18.6%).

The census reported that 972 people (99.2% of the population) lived in households, 8 (0.8%) lived in non-institutionalized group quarters, and no one was institutionalized.

There were 402 households, out of which 124 (30.8%) had children under the age of 18 living in them, 219 (54.5%) were married-couple households, 23 (5.7%) were cohabiting couple households, 84 (20.9%) had a female householder with no partner present, and 76 (18.9%) had a male householder with no partner present. 98 households (24.4%) were one person, and 49 (12.2%) were one person aged 65 or older. The average household size was 2.42. There were 274 families (68.2% of all households).

The age distribution was 221 people (22.6%) under the age of 18, 62 people (6.3%) aged 18 to 24, 227 people (23.2%) aged 25 to 44, 283 people (28.9%) aged 45 to 64, and 187 people (19.1%) who were 65 years of age or older. The median age was 42.9 years. For every 100 females, there were 116.8 males.

There were 538 housing units at an average density of 186.4 units per square mile (72.0 units/km^{2}), of which 402 (74.7%) were occupied. Of these, 291 (72.4%) were owner-occupied, and 111 (27.6%) were occupied by renters.

== Education ==
The CDP is served by the Mammoth Unified School District for grades PK-12.

== See also ==
- List of census-designated places in California
