= Mammoth Unified School District =

School district in California, United States

Address
- 461 Sierra Park Road Mammoth Lakes, California, 93546; United States

District information
- Type: Public
- Grades: K–12
- NCES District ID: 0623530

Students and staff
- Students: 1,119
- Teachers: 57.28 (FTE)
- Staff: 42.14 (FTE)
- Student–teacher ratio: 19.54

Other information
- Website: www.mammothusd.org

The Mammoth Unified School District is a public school district in Mono County, California. It oversees public education in the southwestern part of the county. This includes the town of Mammoth Lakes and the census-designated places of Aspen Springs, Crowley Lake, McGee Creek, and Sunny Slopes, as well as the western part of Swall Meadows.

The district office is in Mammoth Lakes.
