= Comanche Complex Fires =

2011 wildfire in California

- Part of the 2011 California wildfires
- Date: September 10, 2011 –; September 16, 2011
- Location: Arvin, California

Statistics
- Burned area: 29,338 acres (11,873 ha)

Impacts
- Injuries: 6

Ignition
- Cause: Lightning

The Comanche Complex Fires were four fires that burned together in Arvin, California forming the largest fire of the 2011 California wildfire season. The fire, which burned from September 10 to September 16 burning 29,338 acres (11,873 ha) of land. The four fires, which ultimately combined, were the Comanche Fire (25,945 acres, 10,500 ha), the Knob Fire (2,710 acres, 1,097 ha), the Wolf Fire (633 acres, 256 ha), Harris Fire (50 acres, 20.2 ha).
