= Sunny Slopes, California =

- Census-designated place
- Location in Mono County and the state of California

- Location within California Location within the United States
- Coordinates: 37°34′10″N 118°40′33″W
- Country: United States
- State: California
- County: Mono

Area
  - Total: 1.884 sq mi (4.879 km^{2})
  - Land: 1.884 sq mi (4.879 km^{2})
  - Water: 0 sq mi (0 km^{2})
- Elevation: 7,166 ft (2,184 m)

Population (2020)
  - Total: 139
  - Density: 73.8/sq mi (28.5/km^{2})
- Time zone: UTC-8 (Pacific (PST))
  - Summer (DST): UTC-7 (PDT)
- GNIS feature ID: 2583155

Sunny Slopes is an unincorporated community and census-designated place (CDP) in Mono County, California, United States. It sits at an elevation of 7,198 feet (2,194 m). As of the 2020 census, the population was 139, down from 182 in 2010.

== Geography ==
The CDP is in southern Mono County, on the north side of U.S. Route 395, which leads northwest 19 miles (31 km) to Mammoth Lakes and southeast 25 miles (40 km) to Bishop. More than half of the community is within Inyo National Forest.

According to the United States Census Bureau, the Sunny Slopes CDP covers an area of 1.9 square miles (4.9 km^{2}), all land.

== Demographics ==
Historical population
| Census | Pop. | Note | %± |
|---|---|---|---|
| 2010 | 182 | | — |
| 2020 | 139 | | −23.6% |
U.S. Decennial Census; 2000 2010

Sunny Slopes first appeared as a census designated place in the 2010 U.S. census.

The 2020 United States census reported that Sunny Slopes had a population of 139. The population density was 73.8 inhabitants per square mile (28.5/km^{2}). The racial makeup of Sunny Slopes was 117 (84.2%) White, 0 (0.0%) African American, 5 (3.6%) Native American, 0 (0.0%) Asian, 2 (1.4%) Pacific Islander, 9 (6.5%) from other races, and 6 (4.3%) from two or more races. Hispanic or Latino of any race were 12 persons (8.6%).

The whole population lived in households. There were 83 households, out of which 19 (22.9%) had children under the age of 18 living in them, 39 (47.0%) were married-couple households, 12 (14.5%) were cohabiting couple households, 12 (14.5%) had a female householder with no partner present, and 20 (24.1%) had a male householder with no partner present. 22 households (26.5%) were one person, and 8 (9.6%) were one person aged 65 or older. The average household size was 1.67. There were 51 families (61.4% of all households).

The age distribution was 18 people (12.9%) under the age of 18, 2 people (1.4%) aged 18 to 24, 29 people (20.9%) aged 25 to 44, 56 people (40.3%) aged 45 to 64, and 34 people (24.5%) who were 65 years of age or older. The median age was 54.8 years. There were 69 males and 70 females.

There were 156 housing units at an average density of 82.8 units per square mile (32.0 units/km^{2}), of which 83 (53.2%) were occupied. Of these, 64 (77.1%) were owner-occupied, and 19 (22.9%) were occupied by renters.

== Education ==
The CDP is served by the Mammoth Unified School District for grades PK-12.
