= Lion Fire =

2011 wildfire in Central California

- Part of the 2011 California wildfires
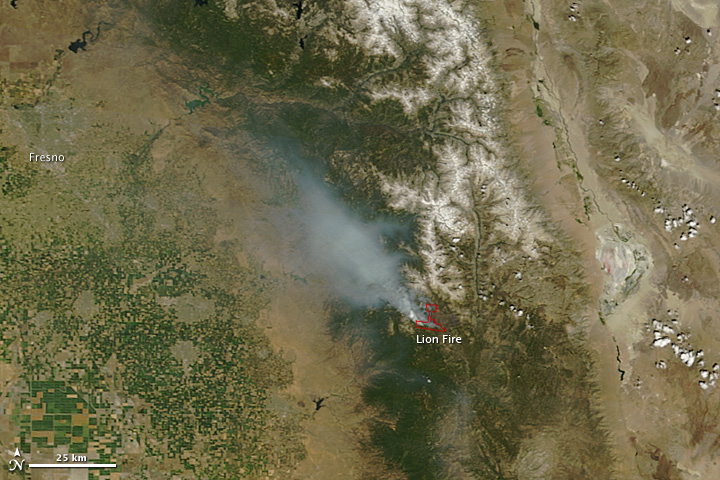
- The Lion Fire as seen from space via MODIS satellite on July 29, 2011.
- Date: July 31, 2011 –; August 12, 2011
- Location: Sequoia National Forest, Tulare County, California

Statistics
- Burned area: 20,674 acres (84 km^{2})

Ignition
- Cause: Lightning

The Lion Fire was the 3rd largest fire of the 2011 California wildfire season. The fire, which was the result of a lightning strike, burned 20,674 acres (84 km^{2}) of land in the Sequoia National Forest. As the fire grew it forced the evacuations of many popular campgrounds in Sequoia National Park.
