= Aspen Springs, California =

Aspen Springs
- Census-designated place
- Location in Mono County, California

- Location within California Location within the United States
- Coordinates: 37°33′00″N 118°42′31″W
- Country: United States
- State: California
- County: Mono

Area
  - Total: 3.59 sq mi (9.29 km^{2})
  - Land: 3.59 sq mi (9.29 km^{2})
  - Water: 0 sq mi (0.00 km^{2}) 0.02%
- Elevation: 7,523 ft (2,293 m)

Population (2020)
  - Total: 70
  - Density: 19.5/sq mi (7.54/km^{2})
- Time zone: UTC-8 (Pacific (PST))
  - Summer (DST): UTC-7 (PDT)
- ZIP Code: 93546 (Mammoth Lakes)
- Area codes: 760; 442
- GNIS feature IDs: 2582936

Aspen Springs is an unincorporated community and census-designated place (CDP) in Mono County, California, United States. It lies at an elevation of 7,109 feet (2,167 m). The population was 70 at the 2020 census.

== Geography ==
The community lies at the eastern foot of the Sierra Nevada in southwestern Mono County. It is 17 miles (27 km) southeast of Mammoth Lakes and 26 miles (42 km) northwest of Bishop.

According to the United States Census Bureau, the Aspen Springs CDP covers an area of 3.6 square miles (9.3 km^{2}), 99.98% of it land, and 0.02% of it water.

== Demographics ==
Historical population
Census	Pop.	Note	%±
2010	65		—
2020	70		7.7%
U.S. Decennial Census; 1860–1870 1880-1890; 1900 1910 1920; 1930 1940 1950; 1960 1970 1980; 1990 2000 2010

=== 2020 census ===
As of the 2020 census, Aspen Springs had a population of 70. The population density was 19.5 inhabitants per square mile (7.5/km^{2}). The median age was 49.5 years. 22.9% of residents were under the age of 18, 60% aged 18 to 64, and 17.1% were 65 years of age or older. For every 100 females there were 100.0 males, and for every 100 females age 18 and over there were 100.0 males age 18 and over.

0.0% of residents lived in urban areas, while 100.0% lived in rural areas.

There were 28 households in Aspen Springs, of which 10.7% had children under the age of 18 living in them. Of all households, 85.7% were married-couple households, 3.6% were households with a male householder and no spouse or partner present, and 0.0% were households with a female householder and no spouse or partner present. About 3.6% of all households were made up of individuals and 0.0% had someone living alone who was 65 years of age or older. Of the 28 households, 24 were families. The average household size was 2.5.

There were 41 housing units, of which 28 (68.3%) were occupied and 31.7% were vacant. The homeowner vacancy rate was 4.2% and the rental vacancy rate was 50.0%. Of occupied units, 82.1% were owner-occupied and 17.9% were occupied by renters.

Racial composition as of the 2020 census
Race	Number	Percent
White	65	92.9%
Black or African American	0	0.0%
American Indian and Alaska Native	0	0.0%
Asian	0	0.0%
Native Hawaiian and Other Pacific Islander	0	0.0%
Some other race	1	1.4%
Two or more races	4	5.7%
Hispanic or Latino (of any race)	3	4.3%

=== 2010 census ===
Aspen Springs first appeared as a census designated place in the 2010 U.S. census.

== Education ==
Aspen Springs is served by the Mammoth Unified School District for grades PK-12.
