= McGee Creek, California =

- Census-designated place
- Location in Mono County and the state of California

- Location within California Location within the United States
- Coordinates: 37°34′22″N 118°47′28″W
- Country: United States
- State: California
- County: Mono

Area
  - Total: 4.01 sq mi (10.38 km^{2})
  - Land: 4.01 sq mi (10.38 km^{2})
  - Water: 0 sq mi (0 km^{2})
- Elevation: 7,701 ft (2,347 m)

Population (2020)
  - Total: 45
  - Density: 11/sq mi (4.3/km^{2})
- Time zone: UTC-8 (Pacific (PST))
  - Summer (DST): UTC-7 (PDT)
- ZIP Code: 93546 (Mammoth Lakes)
- GNIS feature ID: 2583068

McGee Creek is an unincorporated community and census-designated place (CDP) in Mono County, California, United States. As of the 2020 census, the population of the community was 45.

== Geography ==
McGee Creek is in southwestern Mono County, sitting at the eastern base of the Sierra Nevada. U.S. Route 395 forms the northeastern border of the community, leading northwest 12 miles (19 km) to Mammoth Lakes and southeast 30 miles (48 km) to Bishop. The CDP is named for McGee Creek, which flows out of the Sierra Nevada having risen at the McGee Lakes northeast of Red and White Mountain. McGee Creek Road climbs southwestward up the creek valley, ending in 3 miles (5 km) at a trailhead within Inyo National Forest.

According to the United States Census Bureau, the McGee Creek CDP covers an area of 4.0 square miles (10 km^{2}), all land.

== Demographics ==
Historical population
Census	Pop.	Note	%±
2010	41		—
2020	45		9.8%
U.S. Decennial Census; 2000 2010

McGee Creek first appeared as a census designated place in the 2010 U.S. census.

The 2020 United States census reported that McGee Creek had a population of 45. The population density was 11.2 inhabitants per square mile (4.3/km^{2}). The racial makeup of McGee Creek was 30 (67%) White, 0 (0%) African American, 2 (4%) Native American, 1 (2%) Asian, 0 (0%) Pacific Islander, 4 (9%) from other races, and 8 (18%) from two or more races. Hispanic or Latino of any race were 6 persons (13%).

There were 25 housing units at an average density of 6.2 units per square mile (2.4 units/km^{2}), of which 15 (60%) were occupied. Of these, 11 (73%) were owner-occupied, and 4 (27%) were occupied by renters.

== Education ==
The CDP is served by the Mammoth Unified School District for grades PK-12.
