= Swall Meadows, California =

- Census-designated place
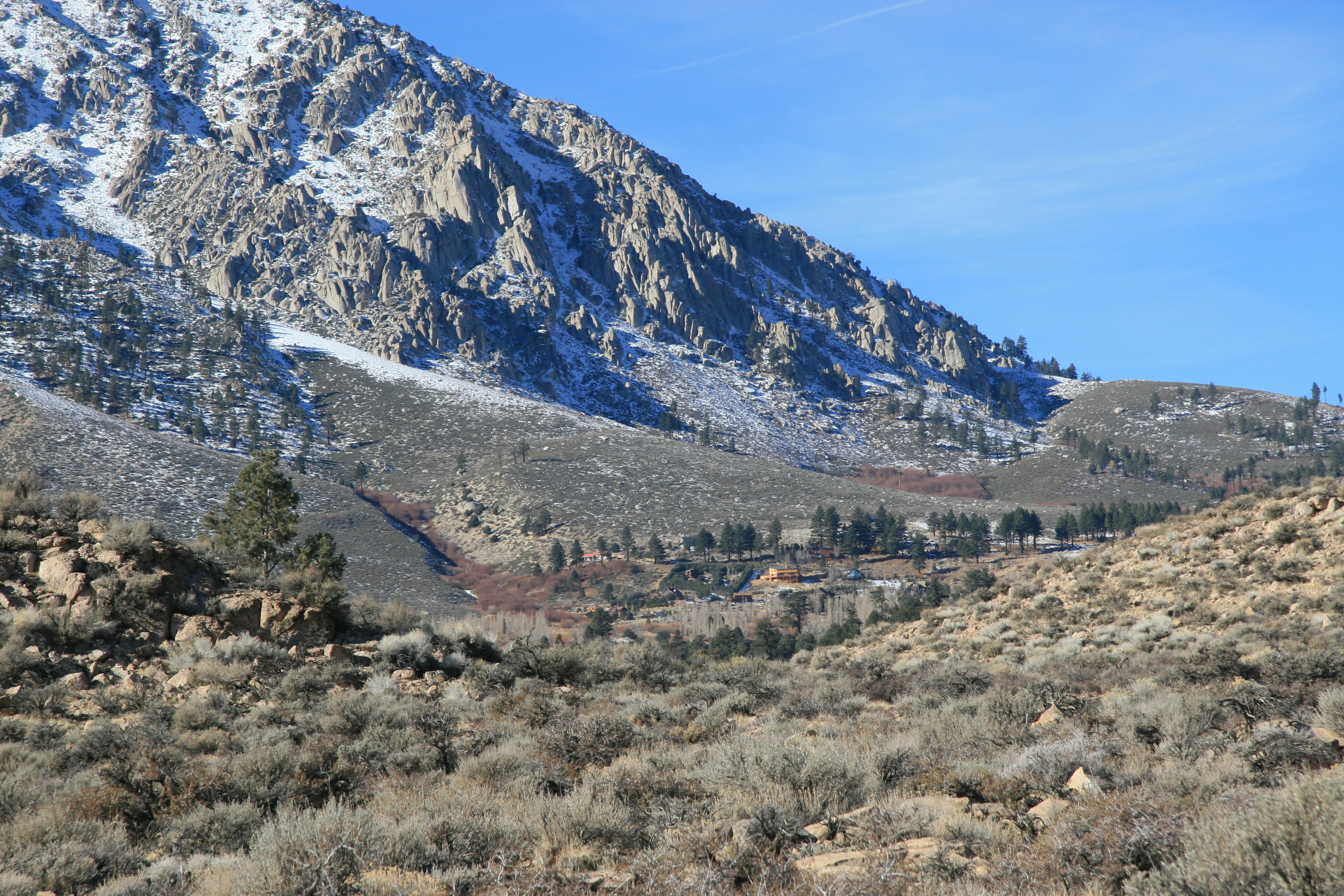
- Top end of Swall Meadows (center), below the Wheeler Crest

- Location in Mono County and the state of California

- Location within California Location within the United States
- Coordinates: 37°30′06″N 118°37′45″W
- Country: United States
- State: California
- County: Mono

Area
  - Total: 4.462 sq mi (11.556 km^{2})
  - Land: 4.462 sq mi (11.556 km^{2})
  - Water: 0 sq mi (0 km^{2})
- Elevation: 6,559 ft (1,999 m)

Population (2020)
  - Total: 178
  - Density: 39.9/sq mi (15.4/km^{2})
- Time zone: UTC-8 (Pacific (PST))
  - Summer (DST): UTC-7 (PDT)
- ZIP Code: 93514
- Area codes: 442/760
- FIPS code: 06-77430
- GNIS feature IDs: 2583158

Swall Meadows is an unincorporated community and census-designated place (CDP) in southern Mono County, California, United States. The population was 178 as of the 2020 census. The community is residential, including second homes and a volunteer fire department, but no commercial development. The ZIP Code is 93514. The community is served by area code 760.

== Geography ==
Swall Meadows sits partway up the Sherwin Grade below the Wheeler Crest of the eastern Sierra Nevada, at an elevation range of approximately 6,000 to 7,000 feet (1,800 to 2,100 m). It is in pinon-juniper/subalpine zone habitat, with views south along the Sierra Crest of Mt. Tom, and east across the Owens Valley to the White Mountains and Nevada. It is accessed from "old 395", or Lower Rock Creek Road. Swall Meadows is approximately 20 miles (32 km) north of Bishop and 25 miles (40 km) south of Mammoth Lakes (by highway distance). It also well known in the area as an important deer migration route for the Round Valley mule deer population, which cherish the grazing in the meadow and apple falls from the old orchard trees.

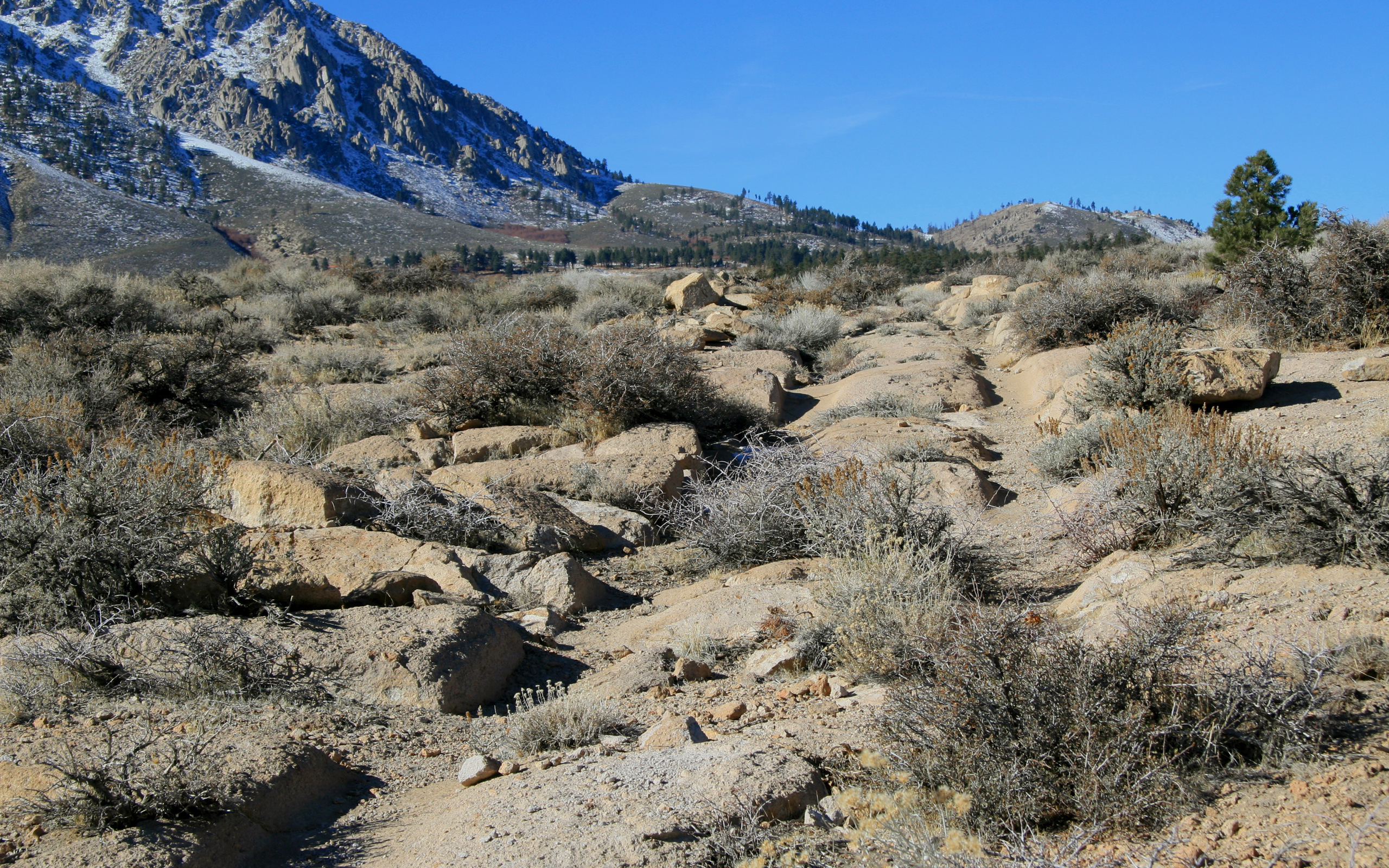
Old wagon road, Paradise to Swall

According to the United States Census Bureau, the Swall Meadows CDP covers an area of 4.5 square miles (12 km^{2}), all land. At the high, northwestern end is the old Sky Meadows Ranch, then houses and firehouse near the meadow, and at the southeast end a development known as Pinyon Ranch.

In addition to the predominant pinyon-juniper-sagebrush habitat, there are permanent and seasonal streams and the eponymous meadow with wetter-habitat vegetation such as Jeffrey pines, willows, stream and bog orchids, and the remnant trees of the old commercial apple orchard. In 2011 the Eastern Sierra Land Trust secured a conservation easement to protect 104 acres (42 ha) of the Swall Meadows meadow area (location of the historic homesite), for the continued benefit of the migrating mule deer. A number of other conservation easements have been completed in Swall Meadows since the ESLT organization was founded in 2001.

Between Paradise and Swall Meadows the old wagon road can be seen that climbed about 3,000 ft (910 m) up the Sherwin Grade from Owens Valley toward Crowley Lake.

== Demographics ==
Historical population
Census	Pop.	Note	%±
2010	220		—
2020	178		−19.1%
U.S. Decennial Census; 2000 2010

Swall Meadows first appeared as a census designated place in the 2010 U.S. census.

The 2020 United States census reported that Swall Meadows had a population of 178. The population density was 39.9 inhabitants per square mile (15.4/km^{2}). The racial makeup of Swall Meadows was 152 (85.4%) White, 3 (1.7%) Native American, 3 (1.7%) Asian, 1 (0.6%) Pacific Islander, and 19 (10.7%) from two or more races. Hispanic or Latino of any race were 12 persons (6.7%).

The whole population lived in households. There were 94 households, out of which 11 (11.7%) had children under the age of 18 living in them, 56 (59.6%) were married-couple households, 1 (1.1%) were cohabiting couple households, 7 (7.4%) had a female householder with no partner present, and 30 (31.9%) had a male householder with no partner present. 29 households (30.9%) were one person, and 12 (12.8%) were one person aged 65 or older. The average household size was 1.89. There were 62 families (66.0% of all households).

The age distribution was 11 people (6.2%) under the age of 18, 7 people (3.9%) aged 18 to 24, 29 people (16.3%) aged 25 to 44, 70 people (39.3%) aged 45 to 64, and 61 people (34.3%) who were 65 years of age or older. The median age was 63.1 years. There were 94 males and 84 females.

There were 128 housing units at an average density of 28.7 units per square mile (11.1 units/km^{2}), of which 94 (73.4%) were occupied. Of these, 79 (84.0%) were owner-occupied, and 15 (16.0%) were occupied by renters.

== Government ==
In the California State Legislature, Swall Meadows is in the 4th senatorial district, represented by Republican Marie Alvarado-Gil, and in the 8th Assembly district, represented by Republican David Tangipa.

In the United States House of Representatives, Swall Meadows is in California's 3rd congressional district, represented by Independent Kevin Kiley.

== Education ==
Much of the CDP is served by the Round Valley Joint Elementary School District and the Bishop Unified School District for grades 9-12 only. A western part of the CDP is in the Mammoth Unified School District for grades PK-12.

Previously the Bishop USD 9-12 area was in the Bishop Joint Union High School District.

== Round Fire ==
On February 6, 2015, Swall Meadows and the neighboring community of Paradise were ravaged by the Round Fire, which burned 7,000 acres (28 km^{2}). The fire destroyed 40 homes: 39 homes in Swall Meadows and 1 home in Paradise.

== See also ==
- 2015 California wildfires
