= Mono County, California =

County in California, United States

Mono County
- County
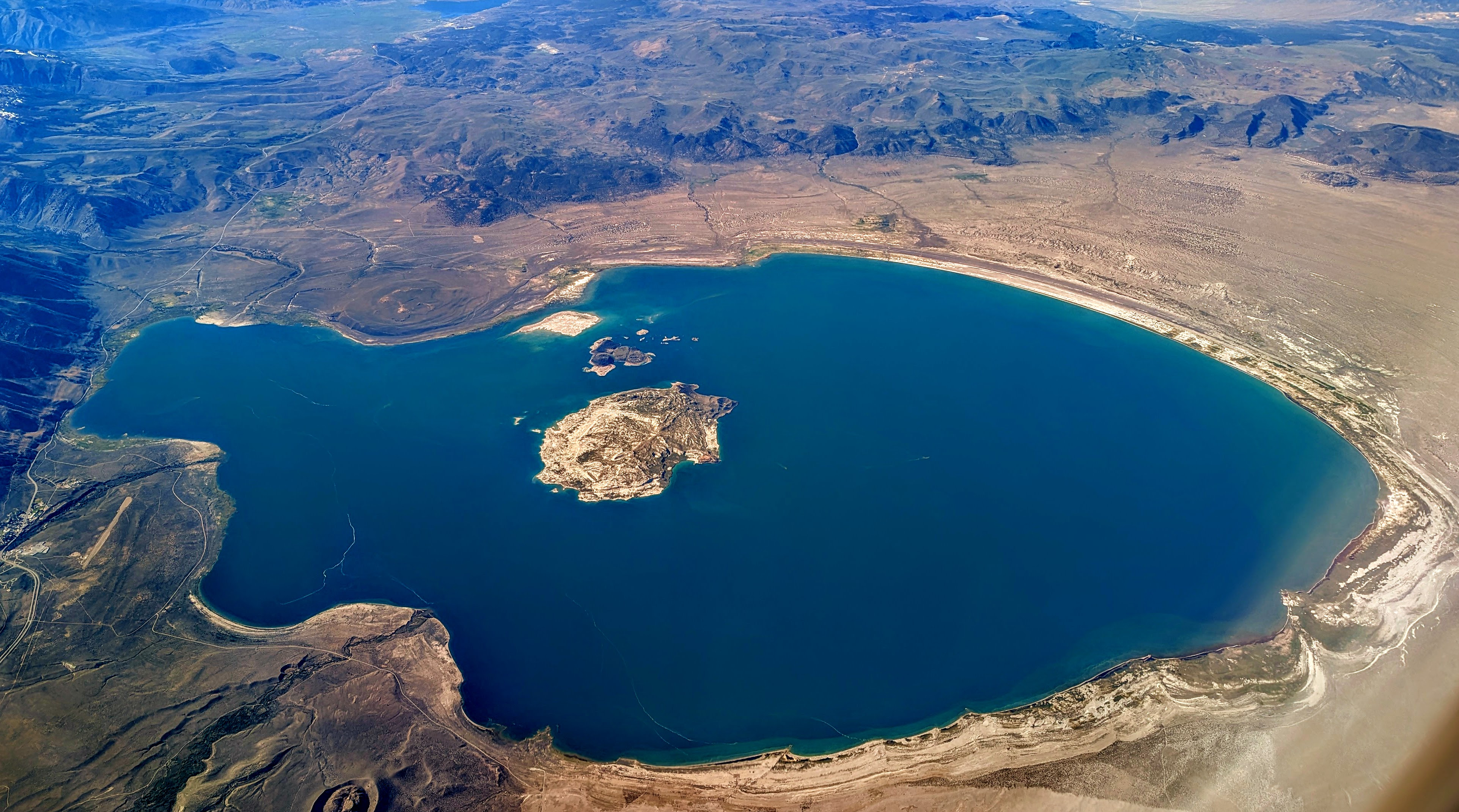
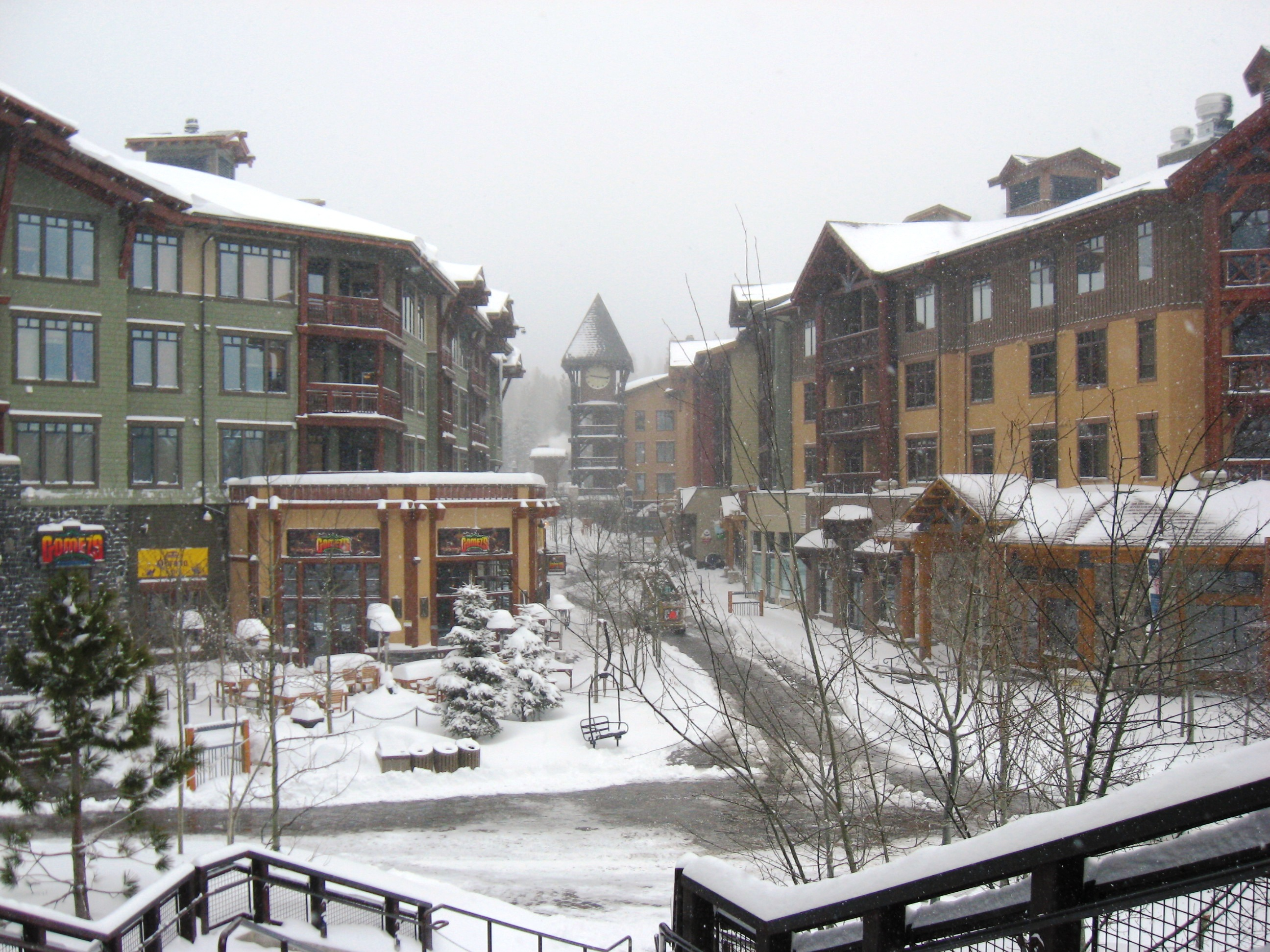
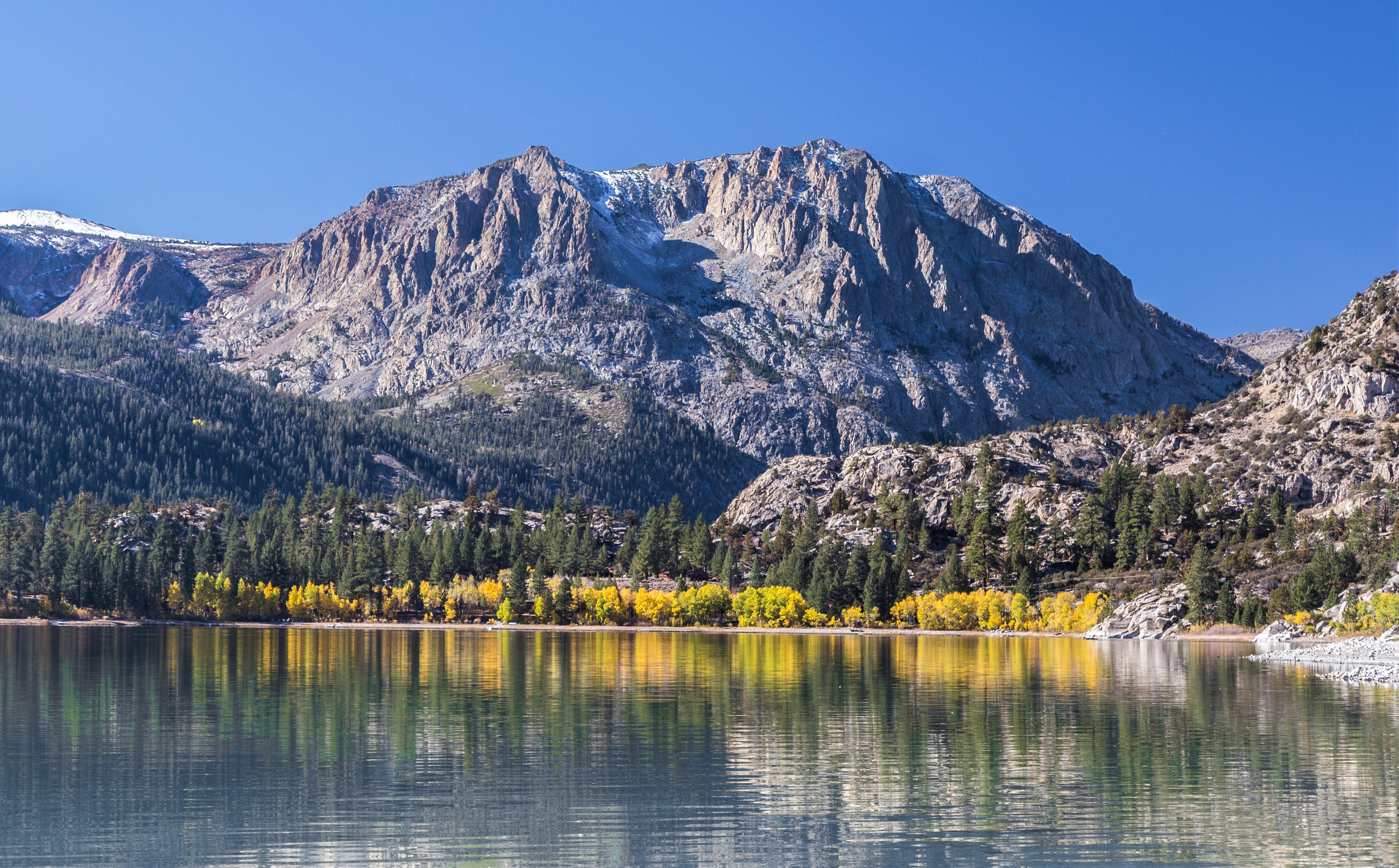
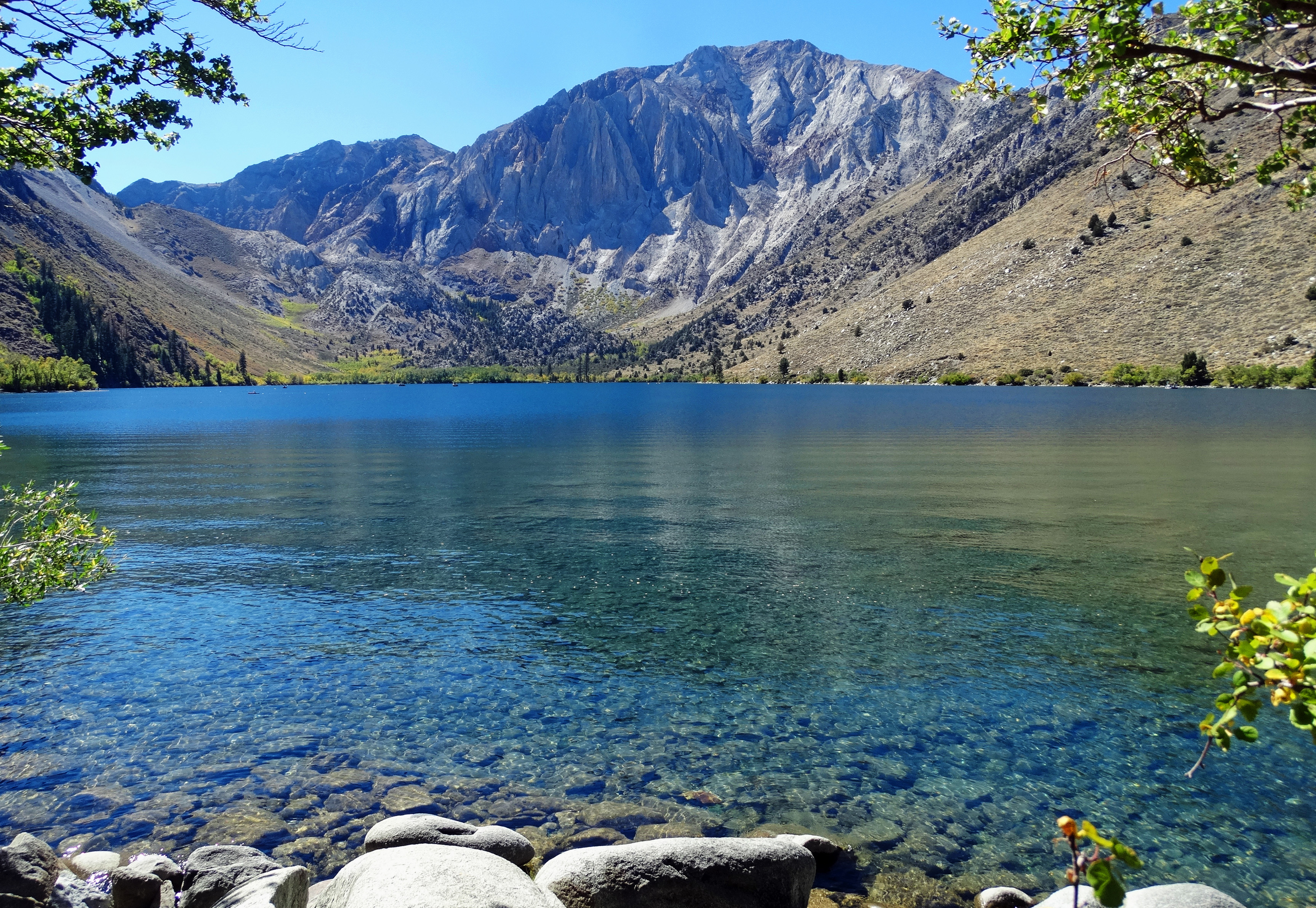
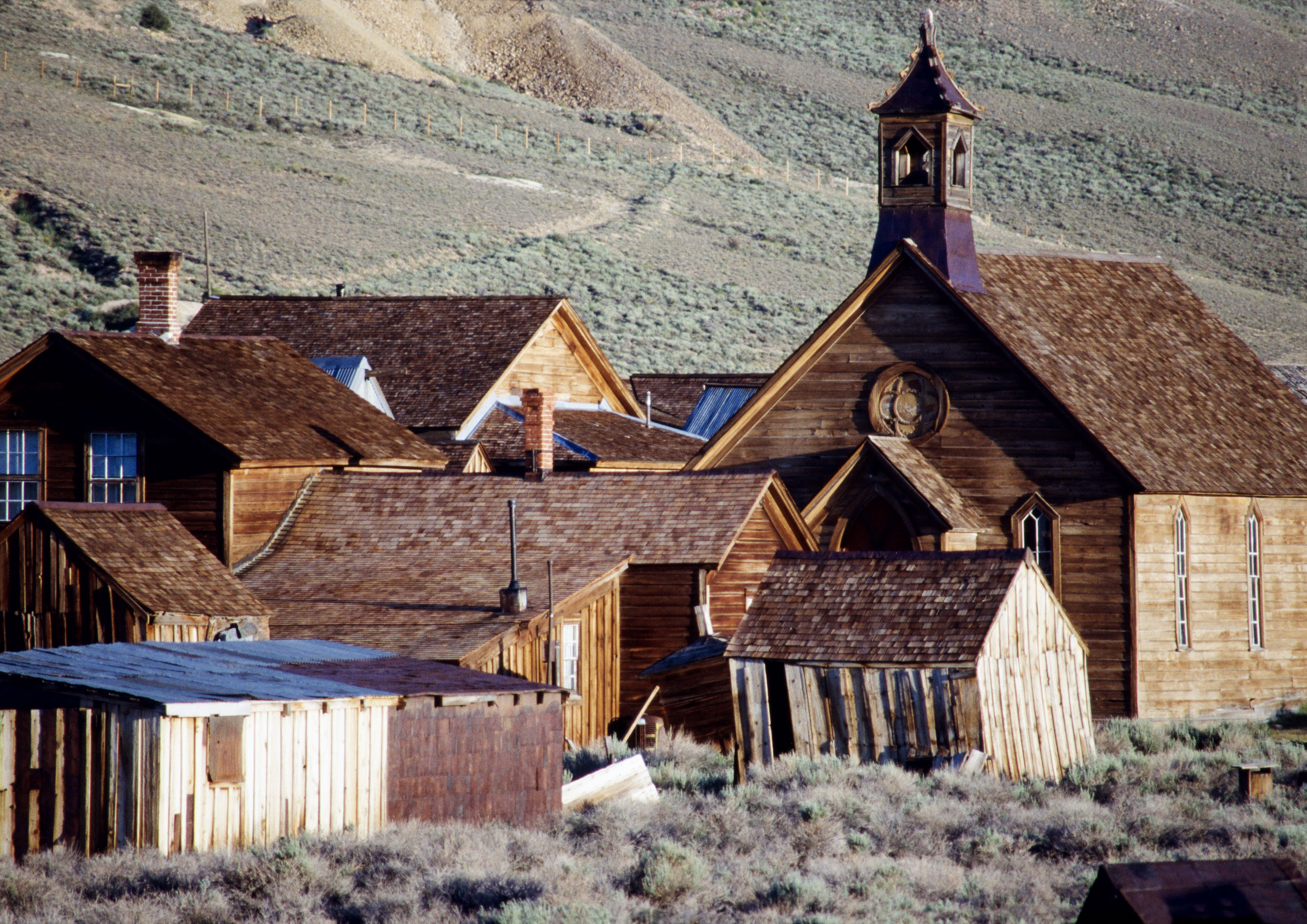
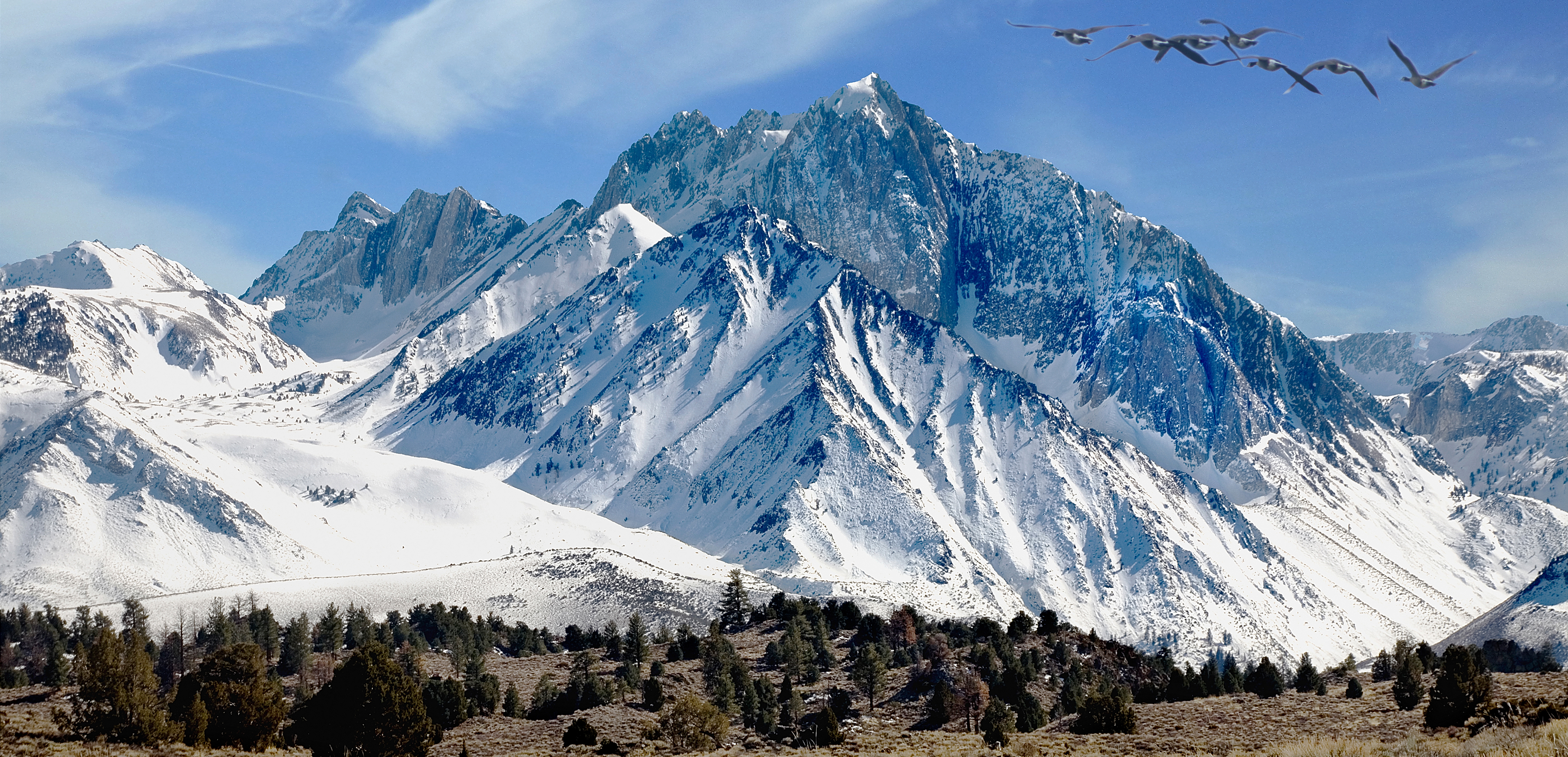
- Mono Lake in the Mono–Inyo Craters Mammoth Lakes Carson Peak Convict Lake Bodie Mt. Morrison in the Sierra Nevada

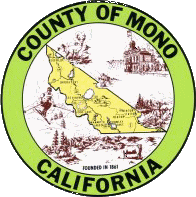
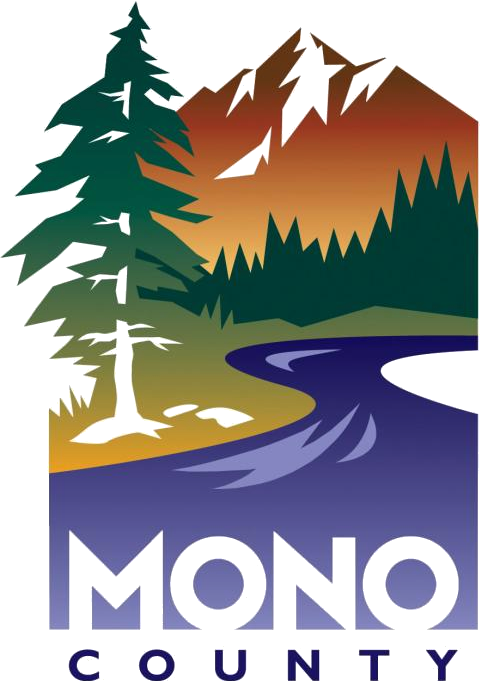
- Seal Logo
- Interactive map of Mono County
- Location in the state of California
- Coordinates: 37°55′N 118°52′W
- Country: United States
- State: California
- Region: Eastern California
- Founded: April 21, 1861; 165 years ago
- Named for: Mono Lake, which is derived from Monachi, a Yokutsan name for native peoples of the Sierra Nevada
- County seat: Bridgeport
- Largest city: Mammoth Lakes

Government
  - Type: Council–CAO
  - Body: Board of Supervisors
  - Chair: Jennifer Kreitz
  - Vice Chair: Paul McFarland
  - Chair Pro Tem: Rhonda Duggan
  - Board of Supervisors: Supervisors: Jennifer Kreitz; Rhonda Duggan; Paul McFarland; John Peters; Lynda Salcido
  - County Administrative Officer: Bob Lawton

Area
  - Total: 3,132 sq mi (8,110 km^{2})
  - Land: 3,049 sq mi (7,900 km^{2})
  - Water: 83 sq mi (210 km^{2})
- Highest elevation: 14,252 ft (4,344 m)

Population (2020)
  - Total: 13,195
  - Estimate (2025): 12,505 ▼
  - Density: 4.328/sq mi (1.671/km^{2})

GDP
  - Total: $1.312 billion (2022)
- Time zone: UTC-8 (Pacific Time Zone)
  - Summer (DST): UTC-7 (Pacific Daylight Time)
- Area code: 530/837, 760/442
- Congressional district: 3rd
- Website: www.monocounty.ca.gov

Mono County (/ˈmoʊnoʊ/ MOH-noh) is a county located in the east-central portion of the U.S. state of California. As of the 2020 United States census, its population was 13,195, making it the fourth-least populous county in California. The county seat is Bridgeport. The county is located east of the Sierra Nevada between Yosemite National Park and Nevada. The only incorporated town in the county is Mammoth Lakes, which is located at the foot of Mammoth Mountain. Other locations, such as June Lake, are also famous as skiing and fishing resorts. Located in the middle of the county is Mono Lake, a vital habitat for millions of migratory and nesting birds. The lake is located in a wild, natural setting, with pinnacles of tufa arising out of the salty and alkaline lake. Also located in Mono County is Bodie, the official state gold rush ghost town, which is now a California State Historic Park. A significant portion of the county consists of one of the largest calderas in the world, the Long Valley Caldera, which is a dormant super-volcano.

== History ==
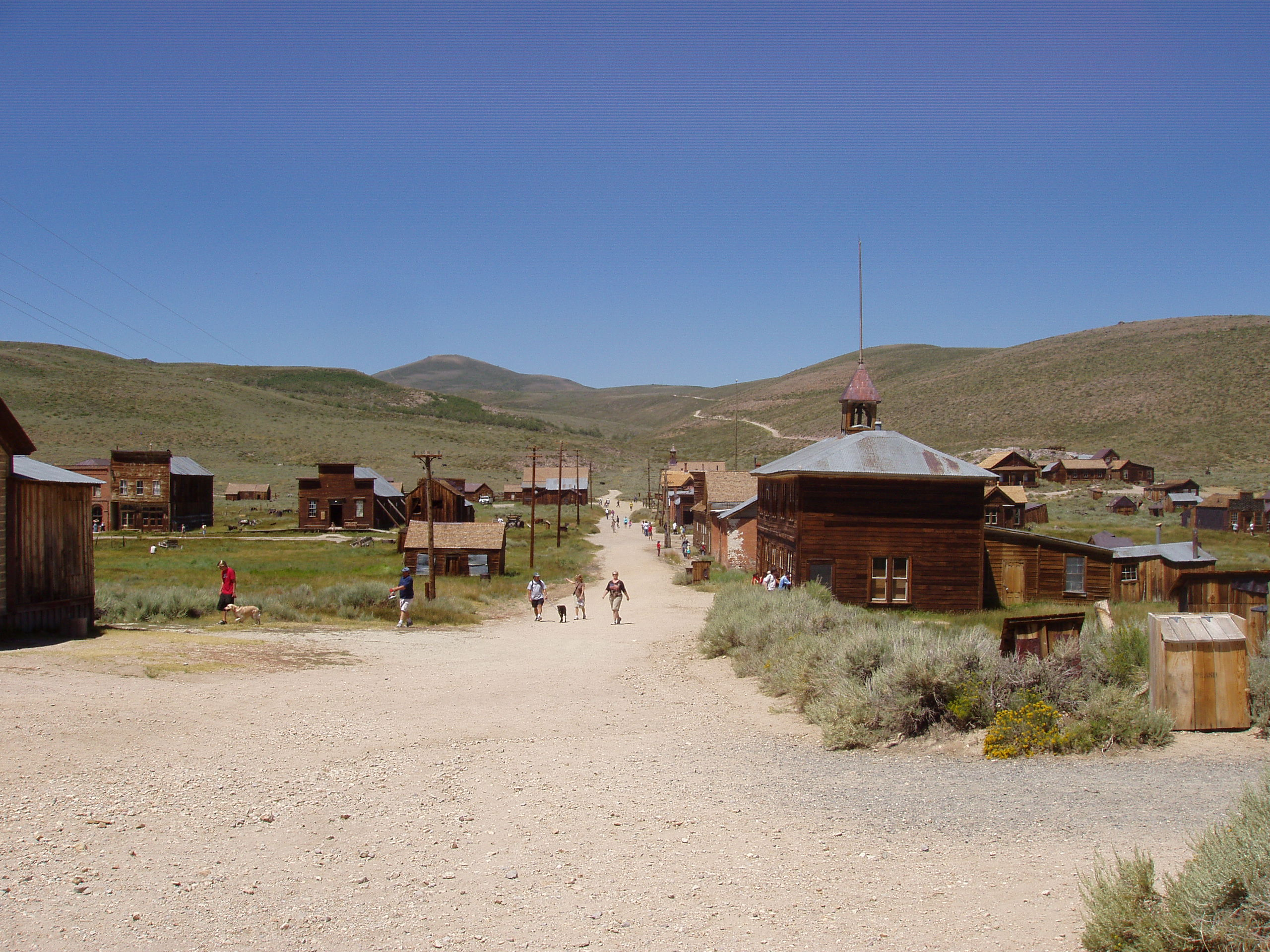
Bodie, as seen from the hill looking to the cemetery

=== Attempted establishment of the County and reestablishment ===
Mono County was formed in 1861 from parts of Calaveras, Fresno, and Mariposa Counties. A portion of northern Mono County contributed to the formation of Alpine County in 1864; parts of the county's territory were given to Inyo County in 1866.

Between its initial formation in 1861 until 1864, the county seat was Aurora, Nevada, assumed to be in California, with the state line being undetermined. The courts of the county and other county functions occurred there in those years until the California Legislature enacted a new statute removing the county seat to Bridgeport in 1864. As counties are merely creatures and subdivisions of the state, the California Supreme Court held that the county was not legally organized in these years and that all "officials" who were elected to county offices were "pretend" as they were non-resident aliens residing in the Nevada Territory. Furthermore, the part of the act creating the county which named Aurora as the county seat was void, exceeding the powers of the State Legislature as Aurora was under the exclusive jurisdiction of the United States, not California. All the acts of the so called officials of the county were void as they were done without the state of California as "there was no Mono County, and consequently no power to bind the county." Therefore, the county came into existence in 1864 when the County seat was set at Bridgeport.

=== Other history ===
The county is named after Mono Lake which, in 1852, was named for a Native American Paiute tribe, the Mono people, who historically inhabited the Sierra Nevada from north of Mono Lake to Owens Lake. The tribe's western neighbors, the Yokuts, called them monachie, meaning "fly people" because they used fly larvae as their chief food staple and trading article.

Archeologists know almost nothing about the first inhabitants of the county, as little material evidence has been found from them. The Kuzedika, a band of Paiute, had been there many generations by the time the first anglophones arrived. The Kuzedika were hunter-gatherers and their language is a part of the Shoshone language.

== Geography ==
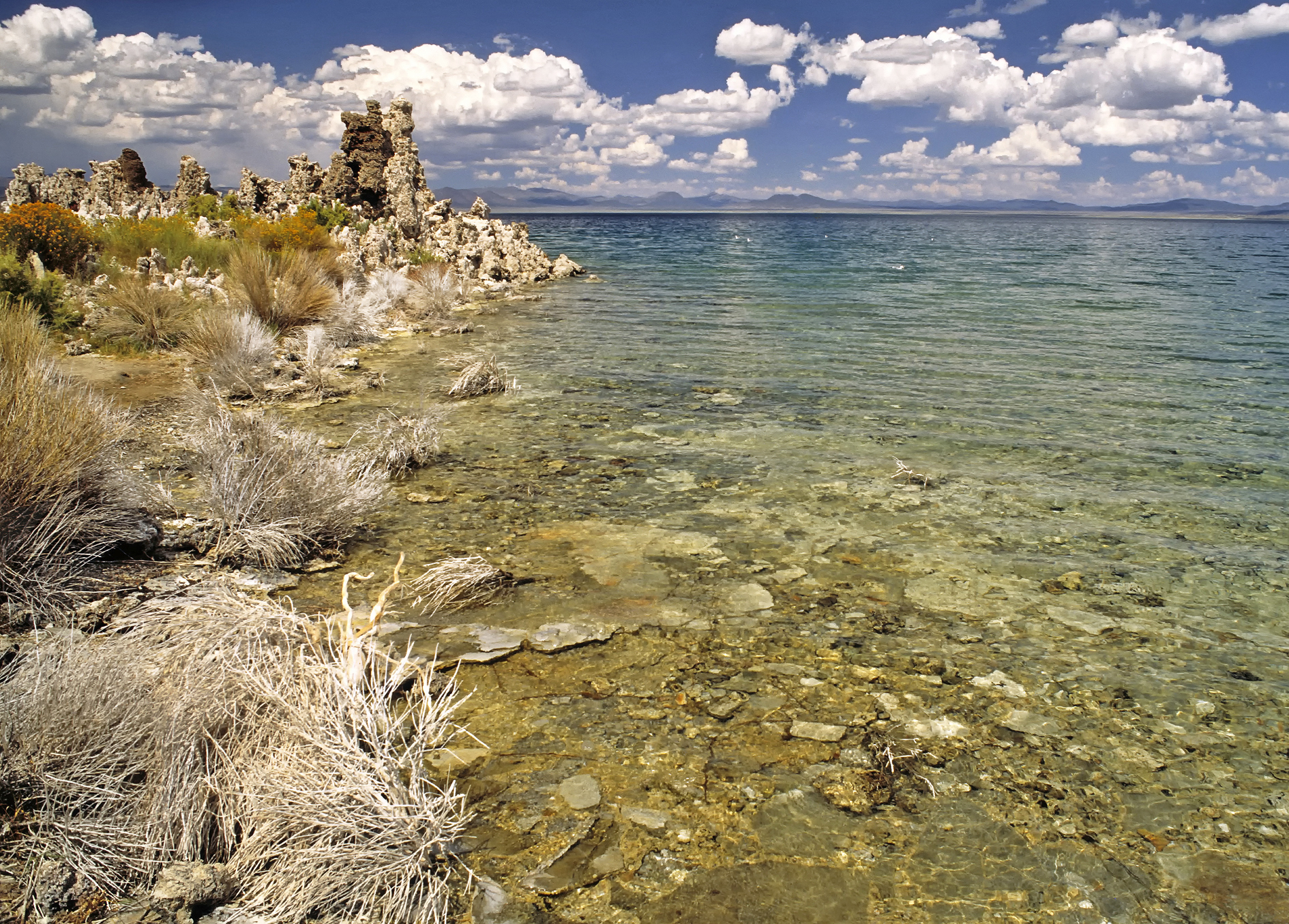
Mono Lake Tufa State Reserve

According to the U.S. Census Bureau, the county has a total area of 3,132 square miles (8,110 km^{2}), of which 83 square miles (210 km^{2}) (2.6%) are covered by water. The highest point in Mono County is White Mountain Peak, which at 14,252 feet (4,344 m), is the third-highest peak in California.

=== Adjacent counties ===
- Inyo County - south
- Fresno County - southwest
- Madera County - southwest
- Tuolumne County- west
- Alpine County - northwest
- Douglas County, Nevada - north
- Lyon County, Nevada - northeast
- Mineral County, Nevada - east
- Esmeralda County, Nevada - southeast

== Demographics ==
Historical population
Census	Pop.	Note	%±
1870	430		—
1880	7,499		1,644.0%
1890	2,002		−73.3%
1900	2,167		8.2%
1910	2,042		−5.8%
1920	960		−53.0%
1930	1,360		41.7%
1940	2,299		69.0%
1950	2,115		−8.0%
1960	2,213		4.6%
1970	4,016		81.5%
1980	8,577		113.6%
1990	9,956		16.1%
2000	12,853		29.1%
2010	14,202		10.5%
2020	13,195		−7.1%
2025 (est.)	12,505	▼	−5.2%
U.S. Decennial Census; 1790–1960 1900–1990; 1990–2000 2010 2020

=== 2021 ===
In June 2021, U.S. News & World Report ranked the county with the third-best life expectancy in the United States at 96.5 years.

=== 2020 census ===
As of the 2020 census, the county had a population of 13,195. The median age was 39.5 years. About 20.0% of residents were under 18 and 16.1% of residents were 65 or older. For every 100 females, there were 114.7 males. For every 100 females aged 18 and over, there were 117.2 males aged 18 and over.

As of the 2020 census, the racial makeup of the county was 70.9% White, 0.6% Black or African American, 2.2% American Indian and Alaska Native, 1.2% Asian, 0.2% Native Hawaiian and Pacific Islander, 12.9% from some other race, and 12.0% from two or more races. Hispanic or Latino residents of any race comprised 26.6% of the population.

As of the 2020 census, 53.4% of residents lived in urban areas, while 46.6% lived in rural areas.

Of the 5,474 households in the county, 28.7% had children under 18 living with them and 19.8% had a female householder with no spouse or partner present. About 28.7% of all households were made up of individuals, and 10.4% had someone living alone who was 65 or older.

Of the 13,589 housing units, 59.7% were vacant. Among occupied housing units, 56.9% were owner-occupied and 43.1% were renter-occupied. The homeowner vacancy rate was 2.0% and the rental vacancy rate was 18.4%.

=== Racial and ethnic composition ===
Mono County, California – Racial and ethnic composition Note: the US Census treats Hispanic/Latino as an ethnic category. This table excludes Latinos from the racial categories and assigns them to a separate category. Hispanics/Latinos may be of any race.
Race / Ethnicity (NH = Non-Hispanic)	Pop 1980	Pop 1990	Pop 2000	Pop 2010	Pop 2020	% 1980	% 1990	% 2000	% 2010	% 2020
White alone (NH)	7,761	8,329	9,837	9,687	8,679	90.49%	83.66%	76.53%	68.21%	65.77%
Black or African American alone (NH)	16	41	53	42	68	0.19%	0.41%	0.41%	0.30%	0.52%
Native American or Alaska Native alone (NH)	334	341	267	239	177	3.89%	3.43%	2.08%	1.68%	1.34%
Asian alone (NH)	43	114	140	191	159	0.50%	1.15%	1.09%	1.34%	1.21%
Native Hawaiian or Pacific Islander alone (NH)	x	x	10	11	26	0.08%	0.08%	0.08%	0.08%	0.20%
Other race alone (NH)	18	5	82	33	78	0.21%	0.05%	0.64%	0.23%	0.59%
Mixed race or Multiracial (NH)	x	x	190	237	501	x	x	1.48%	1.67%	3.80%
Hispanic or Latino (any race)	405	1,126	2,274	3,762	3,507	4.72%	11.31%	17.69%	26.49%	26.58%
Total	8,577	9,956	12,853	14,202	13,195	100.00%	100.00%	100.00%	100.00%	100.00%

=== American Community Survey 2025 data ===
The United States Census Bureau estimated that in 2025, Mono County’s population was 12.505. It was also estimated that the county's population was 63,33% Non-Hispanic White, 29,37% Hispanic or Latino, 0,79% Non-Hispanic Black, 1,62% Asian, 1,34% Native American, 0,22% Pacific Islander, and 3,31% Multiracial.

Total	Population	Percentage
Non-Hispanic White	7.920	63,33%
Hispanic or Latino	3.673	29,37%
Non-Hispanic Black	99	0,79%
Asian	203	1,62%
Native American	168	1,34%
Pacific Islander	28	0,22%
Non-Hispanic Multiracial	414	3,31%

=== 2010 Census ===
The 2010 United States census reported that Mono County had a population of 14,202. The racial makeup of Mono County was 11,697 (82.4%) White, 47 (0.3%) African American, 302 (2.1%) Native American, 192 (1.4%) Asian, 11 (0.1%) Pacific Islander, 1,539 (10.8%) from other races, and 414 (2.9%) from two or more races. Hispanics or Latinos of any race were 3,762 persons (26.5%).

== Politics ==
=== Overview ===
In November 2008, Mono County was one of just three counties in California's interior in which voters rejected Proposition 8, which sought to ban gay marriage. The county's voters rejected Proposition 8 by 55.5 to 44.5% The other interior counties in which Proposition 8 failed to receive a majority of votes were neighboring Alpine County and Yolo County.

Mono County is in California's 3rd congressional district, represented by Independent Kevin Kiley.

In the state legislature, Mono is in the 4th senatorial district, represented by Republican Marie Alvarado-Gil, and the 8th Assembly district, represented by Republican David Tangipa.

=== Election results ===
After voting Republican for six decades, Mono County was won by John Kerry in 2004 by seven votes. It has not voted for a Republican since George W. Bush in 2000.

United States presidential election results for Mono County, California
Year	Republican		Democratic		Third party(ies)	
Year	No.	%	No.	%	No.	%
1892	286	53.36%	166	30.97%	84	15.67%
1896	259	44.27%	315	53.85%	11	1.88%
1900	284	52.11%	258	47.34%	3	0.55%
1904	245	64.64%	82	21.64%	52	13.72%
1908	224	59.89%	121	32.35%	29	7.75%
1912	3	0.81%	182	49.32%	184	49.86%
1916	137	42.02%	158	48.47%	31	9.51%
1920	170	67.73%	56	22.31%	25	9.96%
1924	166	53.55%	45	14.52%	99	31.94%
1928	220	61.80%	127	35.67%	9	2.53%
1932	199	34.25%	374	64.37%	8	1.38%
1936	241	34.09%	458	64.78%	8	1.13%
1940	459	46.13%	523	52.56%	13	1.31%
1944	378	60.87%	242	38.97%	1	0.16%
1948	541	64.79%	255	30.54%	39	4.67%
1952	891	76.61%	264	22.70%	8	0.69%
1956	673	73.79%	237	25.99%	2	0.22%
1960	912	66.33%	457	33.24%	6	0.44%
1964	850	56.07%	666	43.93%	0	0.00%
1968	1,130	64.28%	465	26.45%	163	9.27%
1972	1,872	66.88%	828	29.58%	99	3.54%
1976	1,600	58.80%	1,025	37.67%	96	3.53%
1980	2,132	62.32%	865	25.29%	424	12.39%
1984	2,659	72.31%	962	26.16%	56	1.52%
1988	2,177	61.38%	1,284	36.20%	86	2.42%
1992	1,570	36.05%	1,489	34.19%	1,296	29.76%
1996	1,882	46.00%	1,580	38.62%	629	15.38%
2000	2,296	52.53%	1,788	40.91%	287	6.57%
2004	2,621	49.10%	2,628	49.23%	89	1.67%
2008	2,354	42.25%	3,093	55.52%	124	2.23%
2012	2,285	44.10%	2,733	52.75%	163	3.15%
2016	2,111	40.01%	2,773	52.56%	392	7.43%
2020	2,513	37.30%	4,013	59.56%	212	3.15%
2024	2,294	37.83%	3,522	58.08%	248	4.09%

== Transportation ==
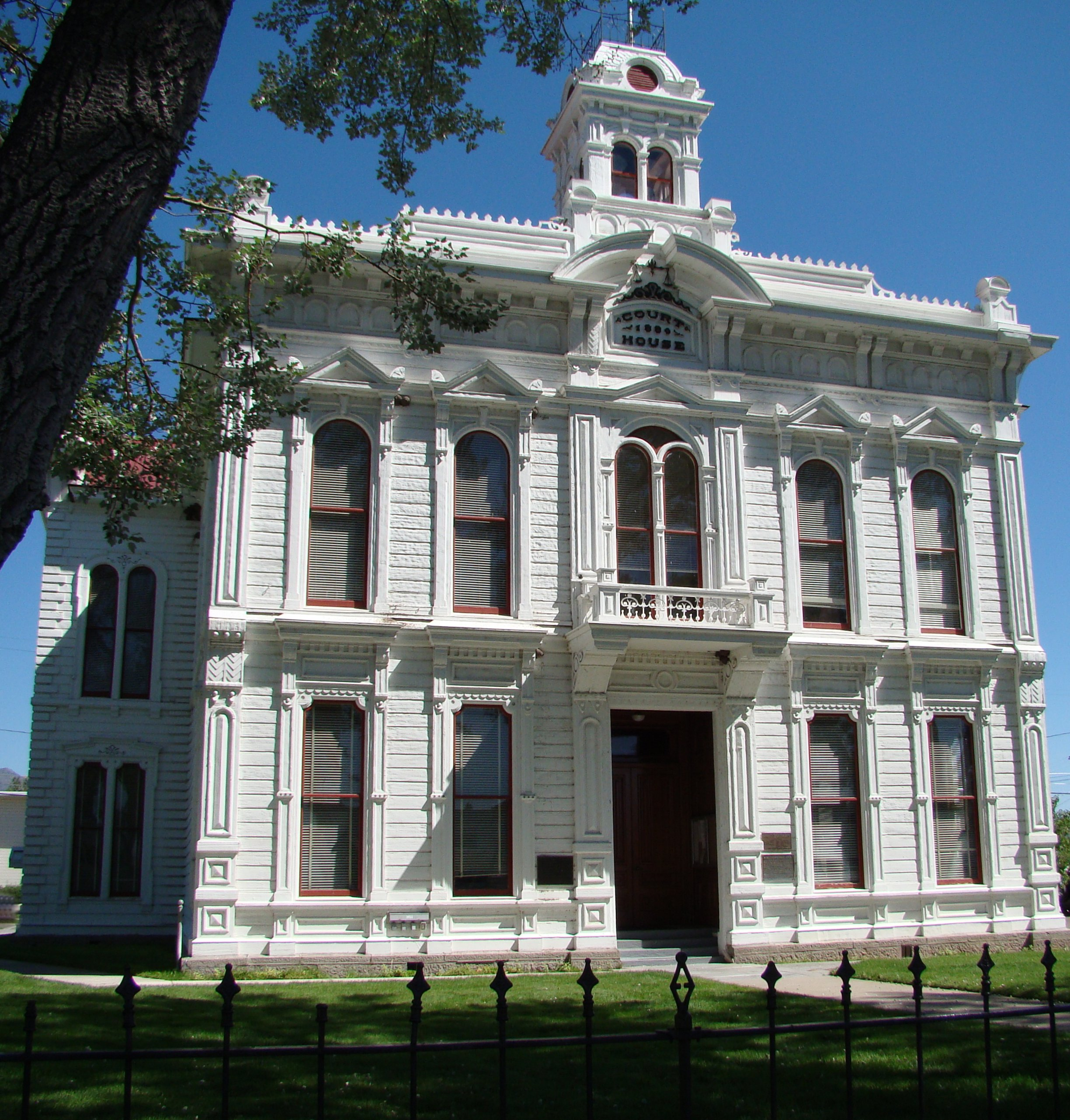
The Mono County Courthouse in Bridgeport.

=== Major highways ===
- U.S. Route 6
- U.S. Route 395
- State Route 89
- State Route 108
- State Route 120
- State Route 158
- State Route 167
- State Route 168
- State Route 182
- State Route 203
- State Route 266
- State Route 270

=== Public transportation ===
Eastern Sierra Transit Authority operates intercity bus service along U.S. 395, as well as local services in Mammoth Lakes. Service extends south to Lancaster, California (Los Angeles County) and north to Reno, Nevada.

Yosemite Area Regional Transit System (YARTS) also runs along U.S. 395 from Mammoth Lakes to Lee Vining before entering Yosemite National Park.

=== Airports ===
General aviation airports in Mono County include Bryant Field near Bridgeport, Mammoth Yosemite Airport and Lee Vining Airport. In December 2021, seasonal commercial air service by United Airlines to San Francisco, Los Angeles, and Denver began at the Eastern Sierra Regional Airport in Bishop, providing local service to southern Mono County.

== Communities ==
=== Town ===
- Mammoth Lakes

=== Census-designated places ===
- Aspen Springs
- Benton
- Bridgeport (county seat)
- Chalfant
- Coleville
- Crowley Lake
- June Lake
- Lee Vining
- McGee Creek
- Mono City
- Paradise
- Sunny Slopes
- Swall Meadows
- Topaz
- Twin Lakes
- Virginia Lakes
- Walker

=== Population ranking ===
The population ranking of the following table is based on the 2010 census of Mono County.

† county seat

Rank	City/Town/etc.	Municipal type	Population (2010 Census)
1	Mammoth Lakes	Town	8,234
2	Crowley Lake	CDP	875
3	Walker	CDP	721
4	Chalfant	CDP	651
5	June Lake	CDP	629
6	† Bridgeport	CDP	575
7	Coleville	CDP	495
8	Benton	CDP	280
9	Lee Vining	CDP	222
10	Swall Meadows	CDP	220
11	Sunny Slopes	CDP	182
12	Mono City	CDP	172
13	Paradise	CDP	153
14	Benton Reservation (Utu Utu Gwaitu Paiute Tribe)	AIAN	76
15	Aspen Springs	CDP	65
16	Topaz	CDP	50
17	McGee Creek	CDP	41
18	Bridgeport Reservation (Paiute Indians)	AIAN	35

== Education ==
There are two school districts covering grades PK-12 in the county: Eastern Sierra Unified School District and Mammoth Unified School District. There is another section in the Round Valley Joint Elementary School District for elementary and middle school, and Bishop Unified School District for grades 9-12 (high school) only.

Previously the Bishop USD 9-12 area was in the Bishop Joint Union High School District.

== See also ==
- List of school districts in Mono County, California
- National Register of Historic Places listings in Mono County, California
