= Byington =

Byington is a surname. Notable people with the surname include:

- A. Homer Byington (1826–1910), U.S. Consul in Naples, newspaper publisher, and Connecticut state politician
- Alberto Byington (1902–1964), Brazilian hurdler
- Bianca Byington (born 1966), Brazilian actress
- Bob Byington (born 1971), American film director, screenwriter and actor
- Carrie L. Byington, Mexican–American clinician and pediatric infectious disease specialist
- Cyrus Byington (1793–1868), American Christian missionary
- Dominique Dillon de Byington a.k.a. Dillon, (born 1988), Brazilian singer-songwriter and pianist
- Elia Goode Byington (1858–1936), American journalist
- Homer M. Byington Jr. (born 1908), the first American Ambassador to newly independent Malaya
- John Byington (1798–1887), minister and the first president of the General Conference of Seventh-day Adventists
- Lewis Francis Byington (1868–1943), American politician from California
- Lisa Byington (born 1976), play-by-play announcer, studio host, and feature producer/reporter
- Mark Byington (born 1976), American basketball coach and former college basketball player
- Noah Henry Byington (1809–1877), American physician and politician
- Olivia Byington (born 1958), Brazilian singer
- Pérola Byington (1879–1963), Brazilian philanthropist and social activist
- Robert Byington Mitchell (1823–1882), brigadier general in the Union Army during the American Civil War
- Robert Lewis Byington (1820–1886), Democratic politician
- Spring Byington (1886–1971), American actress
- Steven T. Byington (1869–1957) American individualist anarchist

== See also ==
- Byington Ford (1890–1985), American real estate developer
- Byington Mill (Frisbie & Stansfield Knitting Company), historic knitting mill located in New York
- Byington Vineyard, vineyard and winery in California
