= Tirey L. Ford =

American politician and lawyer (1857–1928)

Tirey Lafayette Ford
- Ford c. 1913

18th Attorney General of California
- In office January 4, 1899 – September 14, 1902
- Governor: Henry Gage
- Preceded by: William F. Fitzgerald
- Succeeded by: Ulysses S. Webb

Member of the California Senate from the 3rd district
- In office January 2, 1893 – January 4, 1897
- Preceded by: M. H. Mead
- Succeeded by: William F. Prisk

District Attorney of Sierra County
- In office 1888–1890

Personal details
- Born: December 29, 1857 Monroe County, Missouri, U.S.
- Died: June 26, 1928 (aged 70) San Francisco, California, U.S.
- Party: Republican
- Spouse: Mary Emma Byington
- Children: Byington Ford, Mary Relda Ford, Tirey Lafayette Ford Jr.
- Profession: Attorney, Politician
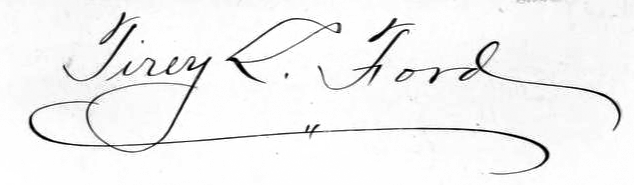
- Signature

Tirey Lafayette Ford (December 29, 1857 – June 26, 1928) was an American lawyer and Republican politician who served in the California State Senate from 1893 to 1897 and asthe 18th Attorney General of California from 1899 to 1902. He also acted as General Counsel for the United Railroads in San Francisco.

== Early life ==
Ford was born on a farm in Monroe County, Missouri, the son of Jacob Harrison Ford and Mary Winn Abernathy. He went to the district county school from 1863 to 1873 and graduated from high school in 1876.

In 1877, at the age of 19, Ford left Missouri and took an immigrant train to Colusa County, California. For three years, he worked on his uncle Hugh J. Glenn's ranch; Glenn was a Democratic candidate for Governor. Ford became a student in the law office of Colonel Park Henshaw in Chico, California. Ford was admitted to the California bar in August 1882.

In 1882, Ford moved to Oroville to practice law in partnership with Senator Albert F. Jones, under the firm name of Jones & Ford. This partnership lasted for one year when Ford moved to Downieville, California, the county seat of Sierra County, where he practiced law under the firm name of Smith & Ford. He specialized in mining law. Tirey stayed in Downieville for eight years.

=== Marriage and children ===
On February 1, 1888, Ford married Mary Emma Byington of California. She was the sister of Lewis Francis Byington and daughter of Lewis Byington. They had three children, sons Byington Ford and Tirey L. Ford Jr., and daughter Relda.

== Political career ==
=== District Attorney ===
In 1888, Ford was elected as District Attorney of Sierra County on the Republican ticket by the largest majority than any candidate for that office in 17 years. He re-elected in 1890 to the office without opposition, the Democrats making no nomination against him.

=== State senator ===
Ford in the Overland Monthly, September 1896

Ford became Republican State Senator in 1892 and 1895 for California's 3rd State Senate district, Plumas, Sierra, and Nevada Counties. On March 23, 1893, Senator Ford introduced two bills known as the Ford's Mining Bills, Senate Bill No. 50, which would allow hydraulic mining where it can be done without material injury to the navigable rivers, and Senate Bill No. 389, which would appropriate $250,000 for building restraining dams, provided by the United States Government.

=== State Board of Harbor Commissioners ===
He was appointed attorney to the State Board of Harbor Commissioners in 1894, which office he held until elected Attorney General for the state of California in 1898. Ford solved a difficult legal dispute over ownership of an area known as Channel Street located in the San Francisco's harbor leading to the bay. A judgment gave this land for public use to the city of San Francisco.

=== Union League Club President ===
In 1898, Ford was elected president of the Union League Club in San Francisco. The Republican club extended fellowship to distinguished guests of the city. Annual meetings were often held at the Palace Hotel in San Francisco.

=== California Attorney General ===
He served as the 18th California Attorney General 1899–1902. One of his noteworthy acts was the reversal of a decision regarding the inheritance tax on the Leland Stanford estate that converted $250,000 to public schools of San Francisco. He resigned as Attorney General in order to become General Counsel for the United Railroads (URR) of San Francisco.

=== State Board of Prisons ===
In 1905, Governor George Pardee selected Ford to be the State Prison Director. Ford wrote a book called California State Prisons: their history, development and management, published in 1910. As director, he created a special bureau for paroled prisoners.

== Private career ==
=== California Miners' Association ===
On March 7, 1892, Ford was elected President of the California Miners' Association. He was a successful mining lawyer in Downieville that was engaged as counsel by the Miners' Association to conduct important cases. Ford went to Washington in January 1896 to expedite the passage through Congress for bills to appropriate money for the construction of works to protect the rivers and streams of California.

=== United Railroads ===
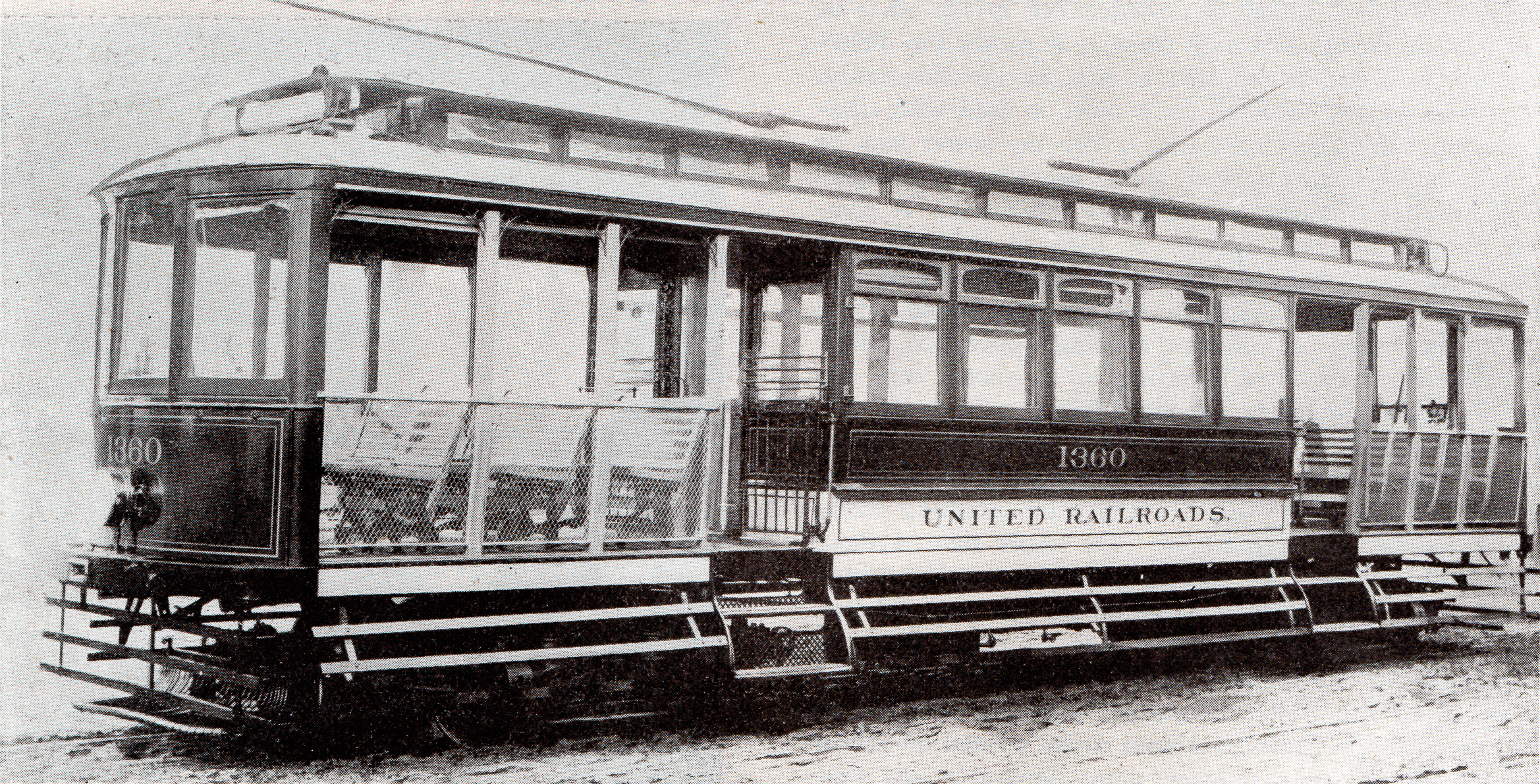
A United Railroads of San Francisco standard car circa 1905

In August 1902, Ford was appointed general counsel for the United Railroads of San Francisco. His knowledge of railroad law as of other departments of jurisprudence was comprehensive and accurate, and he stands today as one of the foremost representatives of the legal interests of California.

Ford in court with his attorneys, Earl Rogers and A. A. Moore, 1907

As chief counsel for the URR, Ford was charged with bribery during the San Francisco graft trials. Assistant District Attorney Francis J. Heney believed Ford had paid "attorney's fees" to political boss Abe Ruef, attorney to Mayor Eugene Schmitz, with the understanding that Ruef would use the money to bribe Schmitz and the Board of Supervisors. Although Ruef had by this time turned state's evidence, Heney did not believe he was telling the prosecution the whole truth in other cases, and refused to call him as a witness in Ford's trial. This critical lack of testimony led the jury to acquit Ford.

Adolphus Frederic St. Sure joined Ford's law firm in San Francisco. During the 1906 San Francisco earthquake and fire, Ford became a member of Mayor Eugene Schmitz's Committee of Fifty.

Ford was a member of the Pacific-Union Club, Bohemian Club, Union League Club of San Francisco, Commonwealth Club of California, Press, Transportation, Merchants Institute, Amaurot, and Southern Clubs, and as a Knight Templar.

== Retirement ==
After his retirement, Ford took up historical studies and literary pursuits. In 1926 he published a novel, Dawn and the Dons: The Romance of Monterey, with vignettes and sketches by artist Jo Mora.

Tirey was an avid golfer and won the Club Shield of the Presidio Golf Club in a tournament on January 3, 1916. His hobby for reducing everything to a system led him to keep a record of his first one thousand rounds on the links. On February 19, 1925, Ford was among the 68 charter members of the Monterey Peninsula Country Club.

== Death and funeral ==
On June 26, 1928, Ford died in his bed of a sudden heart attack. He was 70 years old. He was interred at the family mausoleum, at the Holy Cross Cemetery in Colma, California.

== Books ==
- Dawn and the Dons; the Romance of Monterey
- California State Prisons, their history, development and management

== Articles ==
- The Lamp of Experience. Its Light on the Political Situation, 1896
- The Law and the Miner, 1896
- A Tribute to William McKinley, 1896
- Speech on National Issues, 1900
- The City Imperishable, 1917

Legal offices
Preceded by William F. Fitzgerald	California Attorney General; January 4, 1899 – September 14, 1902	Succeeded by Ulysses S. Webb
California Senate
Preceded by M. H. Mead	California's 3rd State Senate district January 2, 1893 - January 4, 1897	Succeeded by William F. Prisk
