= Downieville, California =

Downieville
- census-designated place
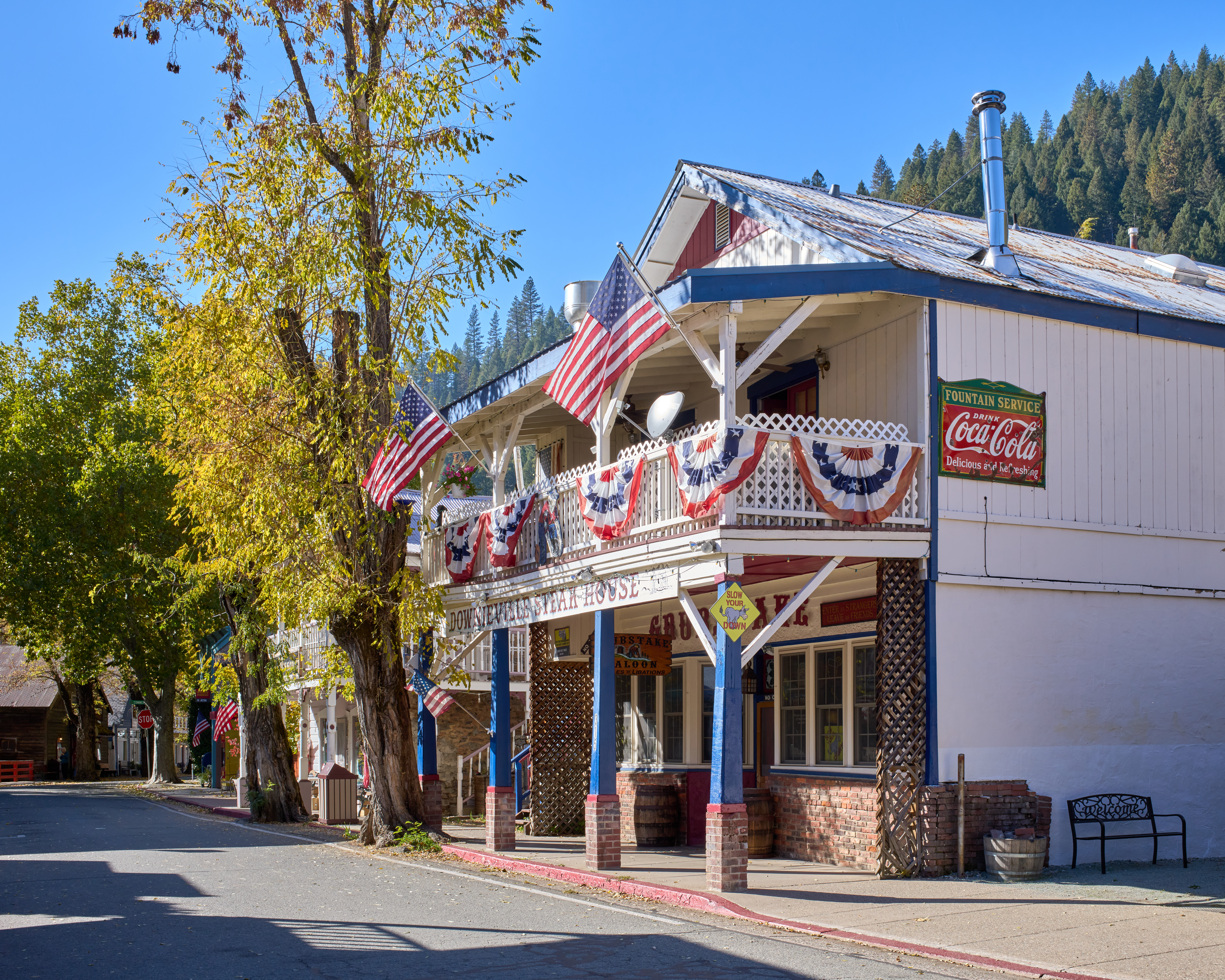
- Main Street in the Downieville Historic Riverfront District (2024)
- Interactive map of Downieville
- Location within the state of California Downieville (the United States)
- Coordinates: 39°34′03″N 120°48′44″W
- Country: United States
- State: California
- County: Sierra

Area
  - Total: 3.19 sq mi (8.25 km^{2})
  - Land: 3.18 sq mi (8.24 km^{2})
  - Water: 0.0039 sq mi (0.01 km^{2}) 0.17%
- Elevation: 2,966 ft (904 m)

Population (2020)
  - Total: 290
  - Density: 91/sq mi (35.2/km^{2})
- Time zone: UTC-8 (Pacific (PST))
  - Summer (DST): UTC-7 (PDT)
- ZIP codes: 95936
- Area code: 530
- FIPS code: 06-19794
- GNIS feature ID: 2583000

Downieville is a census-designated place in and the county seat of Sierra County, California, United States. Downieville is on the North Fork of the Yuba River, at an elevation of 2,966 feet (904 m). The 2020 United States census reported Downieville's population was 290.

== History ==
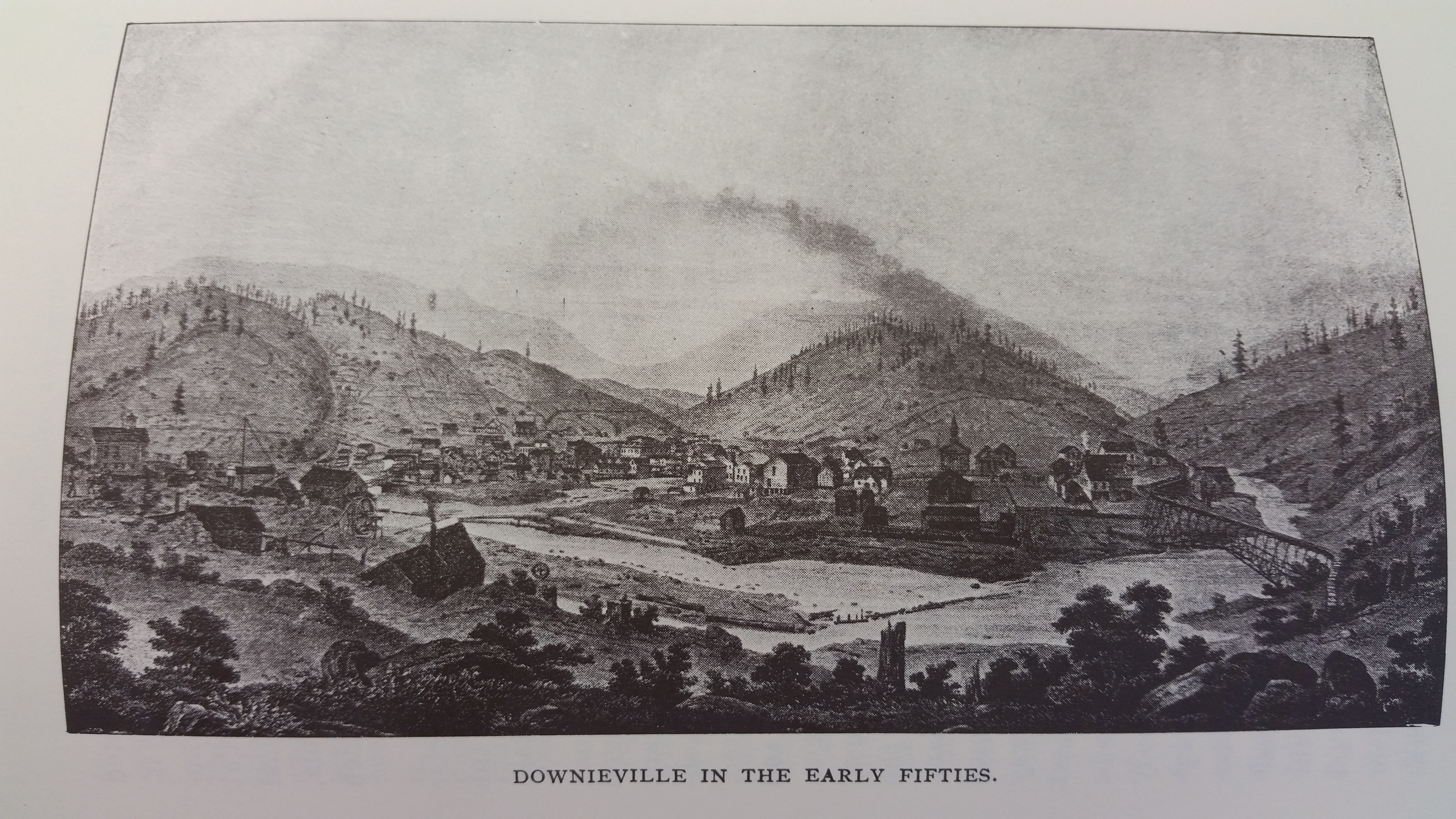
1850s Downieville

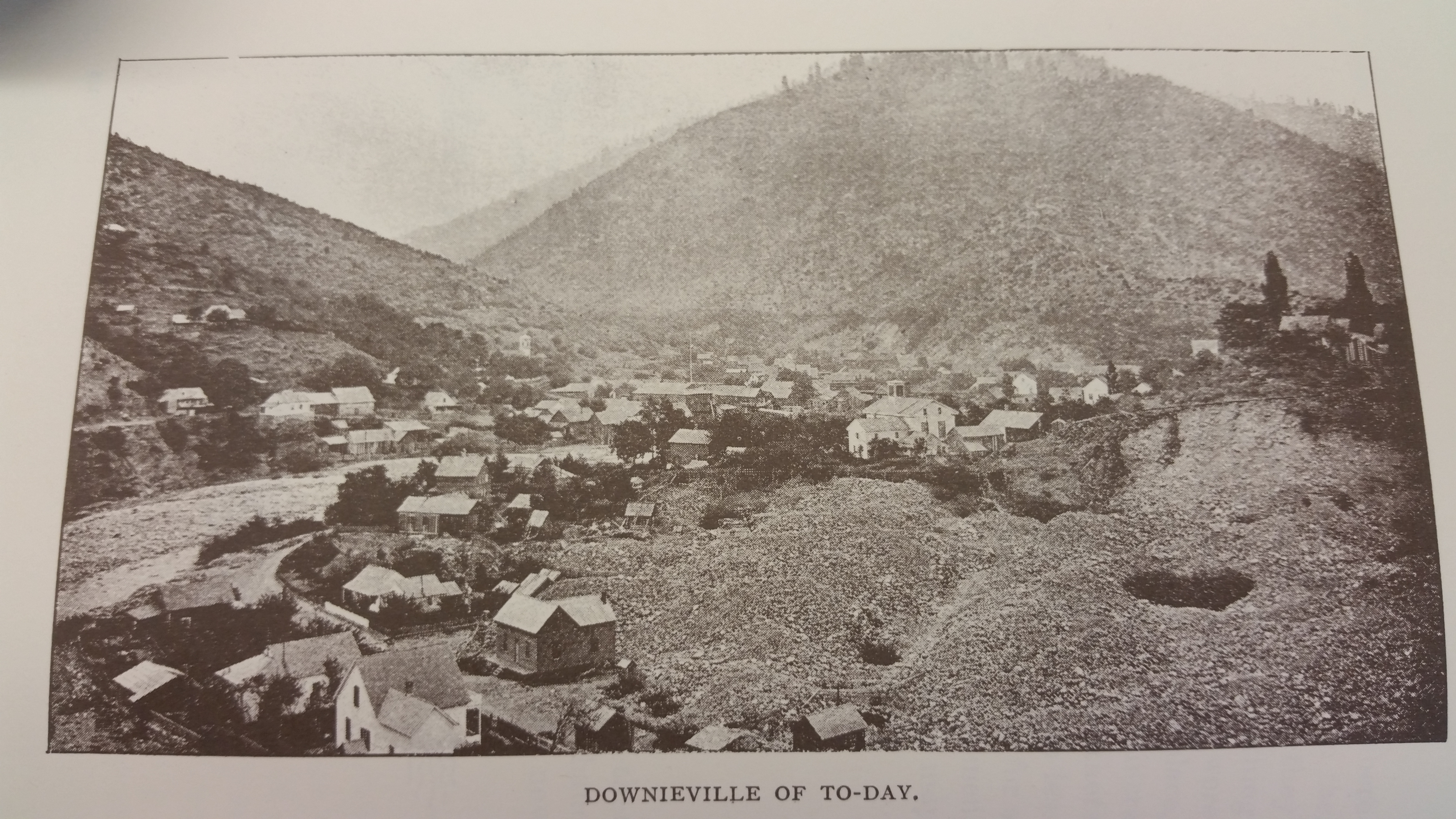
1890s Downieville

Gold was discovered here by Francis Anderson on September 14, 1849. Anderson had joined Phil A. Haven that same year along the North Yuba River.

Downieville was founded in late 1849 during the California Gold Rush, in the Northern Mines area. It was first known as "The Forks" for its geographical location at the confluence of the Downie River and North Fork of the Yuba River.

It was soon renamed after Major William Downie (1820–1893), the town's founder. Downie was a Scotsman who had led an expedition of nine miners, seven of them African American men, up the North Fork of the Yuba River in the Autumn of 1849. At the present site of the town they struck rich gold, built a log cabin, and settled in to wait out the winter. By 1850, Downieville had 15 hotels, 4 bakeries, 4 butcher shops, and numerous saloons.

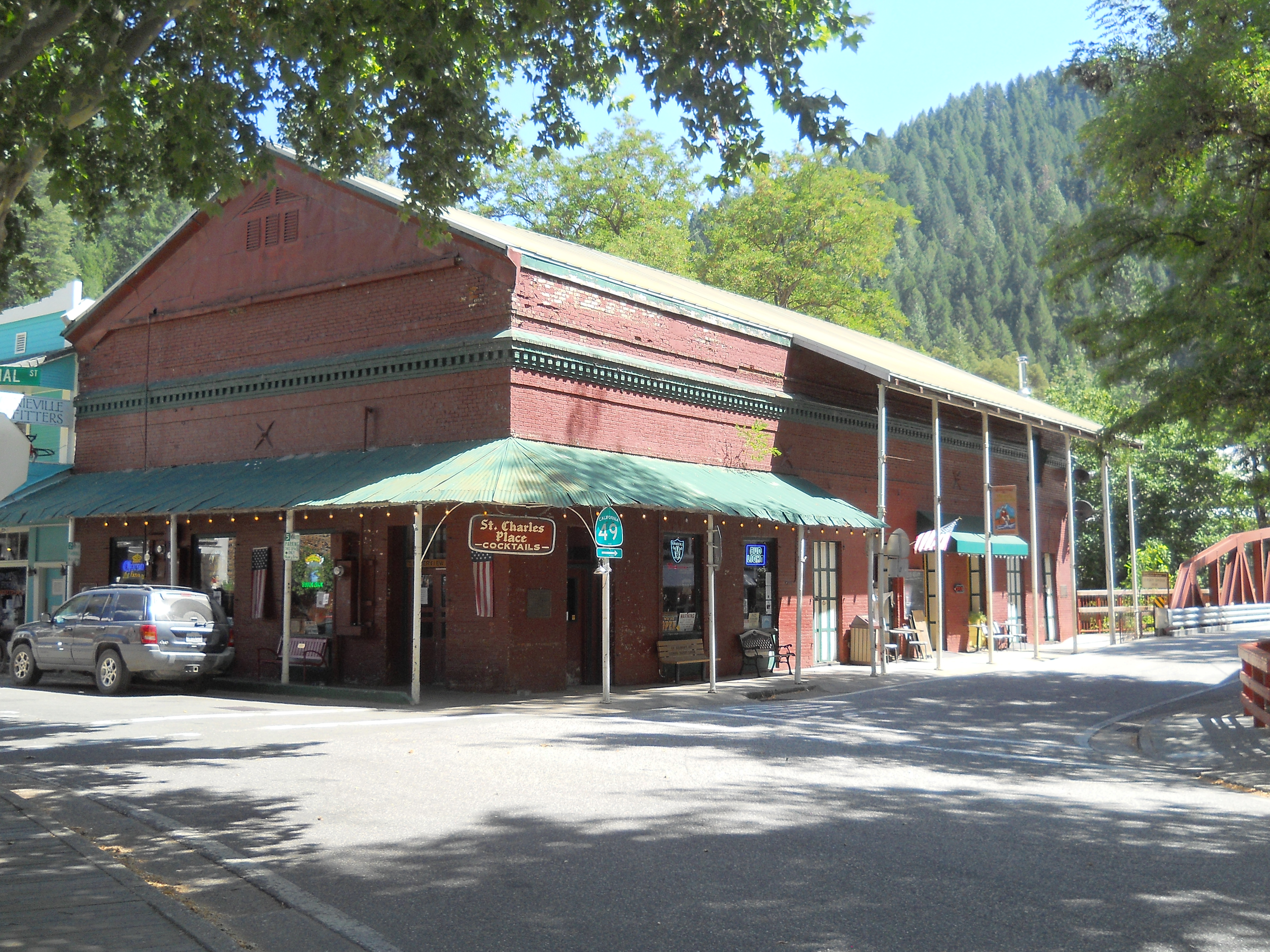
Craycroft Building

In 1850 John Craycroft & Company constructed a log building, which had a 70-foot bar made from a rip-sawed board. The building was destroyed by fire on February 19, 1852, and was rebuilt by the current brick building that now houses the St. Charles Place in the old Craycroft building.

Josefa Segovia, a young Californio resident of the town, was lynched by a mob on July 5, 1851. The lynch mob held a mock trial, and accused her of killing an American miner. The mock trial quickly led to hanging her from the Jersey Bridge in town. Segovia's case was the only recorded hanging of a woman in the history of California.

In 1853 Downieville was vying to become the new state capital of California, along with fifteen other California communities to replace Vallejo. The capital was moved to Benicia for a year, and then in 1854 to Sacramento.

The Northern Mines area of the gold rush had a number of mining camps with colorful names, such as Brandy City (originally known as Strychnine City), Whiskey Diggins, Poverty Hill, Poker Flat, and Camptonville. Many of these camps disappeared after the gold rush or became ghost towns. Downieville had reached a peak population of over 5,000 people in 1851, but by 1865 had significantly declined. It survived due to its status as the county seat of government in Sierra County, and from its geographic location between Sacramento Valley and Tahoe region/Nevada destinations.

== Demographics ==
Historical population
| Census | Pop. | Note | %± |
|---|---|---|---|
| 2010 | 282 | | — |
| 2020 | 290 | | 2.8% |
U.S. Decennial Census; 1850–1870 1880-1890; 1900 1910 1920; 1930 1940 1950; 1960 1970 1980; 1990 2000 2010

Downieville first appeared as a census designated place in the 2010 U.S. census.

=== Racial and ethnic composition ===
Downieville CDP, California – Racial and ethnic composition Note: the US Census treats Hispanic/Latino as an ethnic category. This table excludes Latinos from the racial categories and assigns them to a separate category. Hispanics/Latinos may be of any race.
| Race / Ethnicity (NH = Non-Hispanic) | Pop 2010 | Pop 2020 | % 2010 | % 2020 |
|---|---|---|---|---|
| White alone (NH) | 258 | 220 | 91.49% | 75.86% |
| Black or African American alone (NH) | 0 | 0 | 0.00% | 0.00% |
| Native American or Alaska Native alone (NH) | 4 | 2 | 1.42% | 0.69% |
| Asian alone (NH) | 2 | 2 | 0.71% | 0.69% |
| Native Hawaiian or Pacific Islander alone (NH) | 0 | 0 | 0.00% | 0.00% |
| Other race alone (NH) | 0 | 4 | 0.00% | 1.38% |
| Mixed race or Multiracial (NH) | 6 | 32 | 2.13% | 11.03% |
| Hispanic or Latino (any race) | 12 | 30 | 4.26% | 10.34% |
| Total | 282 | 290 | 100.00% | 100.00% |

=== 2020 census ===
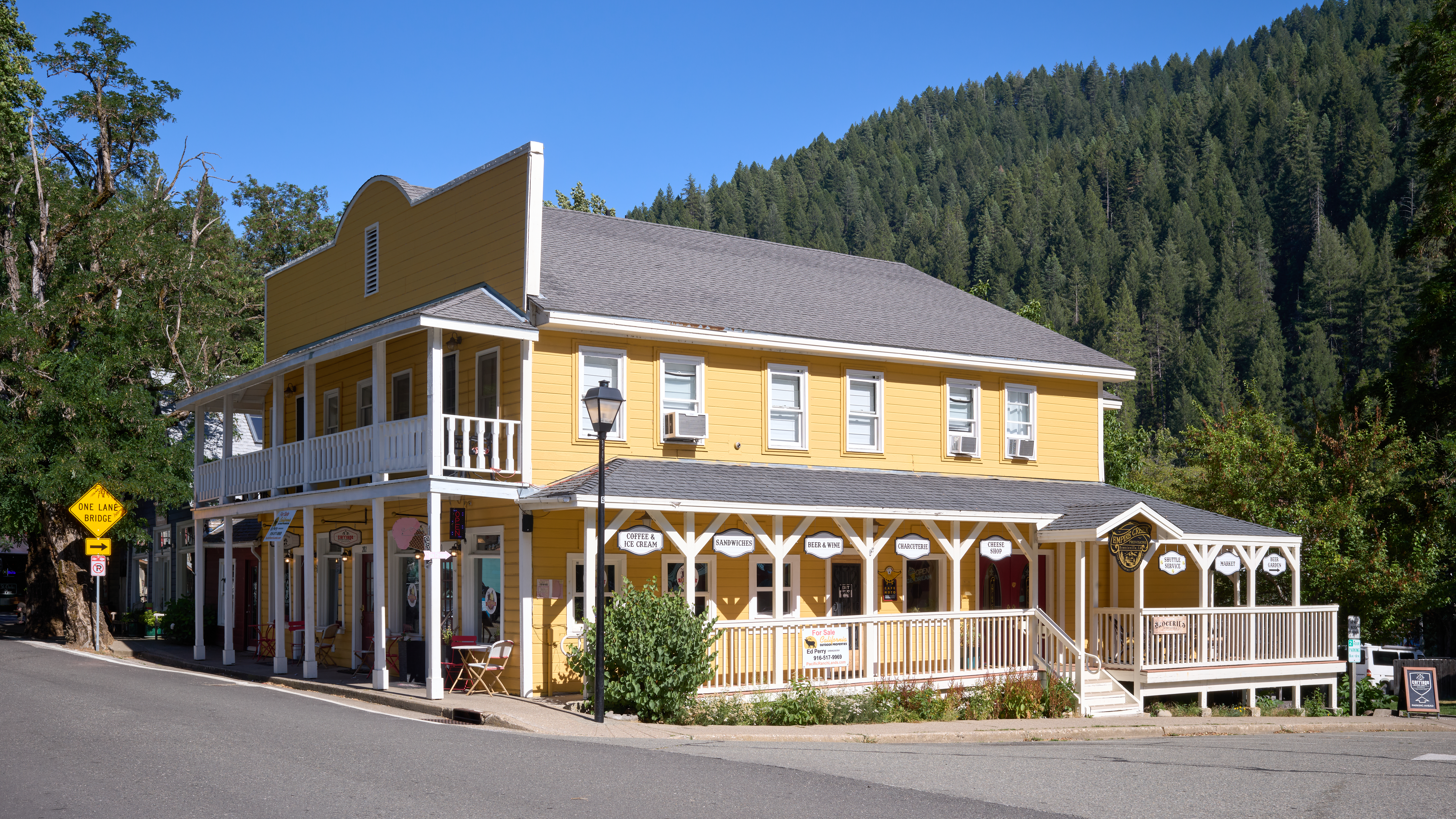
The Shoppes at Downieville, a mixed-use commercial building near the entrance to historic downtown Downieville

The 2020 United States census reported that Downieville had a population of 290. The population density was 91.2 inhabitants per square mile (35.2/km^{2}). The racial makeup of Downieville was 232 (80.0%) White, 0 (0.0%) African American, 5 (1.7%) Native American, 2 (0.7%) Asian, 0 (0.0%) Pacific Islander, 7 (2.4%) from other races, and 44 (15.2%) from two or more races. Hispanic or Latino of any race were 30 persons (10.3%).

The whole population lived in households. There were 137 households, out of which 29 (21.2%) had children under the age of 18 living in them, 73 (53.3%) were married-couple households, 8 (5.8%) were cohabiting couple households, 36 (26.3%) had a female householder with no partner present, and 20 (14.6%) had a male householder with no partner present. 42 households (30.7%) were one person, and 29 (21.2%) were one person aged 65 or older. The average household size was 2.12. There were 89 families (65.0% of all households).

The age distribution was 43 people (14.8%) under the age of 18, 12 people (4.1%) aged 18 to 24, 40 people (13.8%) aged 25 to 44, 73 people (25.2%) aged 45 to 64, and 122 people (42.1%) who were 65 years of age or older. The median age was 59.2 years. For every 100 females, there were 101.4 males.

There were 225 housing units at an average density of 70.7 units per square mile (27.3 units/km^{2}), of which 137 (60.9%) were occupied. Of these, 109 (79.6%) were owner-occupied, and 28 (20.4%) were occupied by renters.

== Government ==
=== Local ===
Because Loyalton is Sierra County's most populous municipality and its only incorporated city, generally half of the meetings of the county's board of supervisors are held in Downieville and the other half are held in Loyalton.

=== State and Federal ===
In the state legislature, Downieville is in the 1st senatorial district, represented by Republican Megan Dahle, and the 1st Assembly district, represented by Republican Heather Hadwick.

Federally, Downieville is in California's 3rd congressional district, represented by Independent Kevin Kiley.

== Recreation and tourism ==
Downieville is surrounded by the Yuba River District of the Tahoe National Forest. Popular outdoor recreation activities include fishing, mountain biking, back country "jeeping" and motorcycling, kayaking, hiking and nature walks, gold panning, and sites of the California Gold Rush. Fishing includes planted rainbow trout and German brown trout in the North Fork of the Yuba River.

=== Mountain biking ===
The town is a popular destination and central hub for mountain biking trails and events. The renowned "Downieville Downhill" singletrack trail has a 4,400 feet (1,300 m) drop over its 17 miles (27 km) length. There are shuttles to the trailhead available in town, which is its terminus. It includes long and narrow suspension footbridges across canyons and streams.

The town hosts the world-famous Downieville Classic mountain biking races, a two-day event with an Enduro style or Super-D downhill race, and an extremely challenging cross-country cycling race. In 2003 the Single Speed World Championship was held in Downieville.

=== Whitewater Rafting ===
The town of Downieville is the meeting location for many whitewater water rafting trips on the North Yuba River both privately and commercially. Commercial rafting is done by multiple companies including Tributary Whitewater Tours and Raft California.

=== Downieville Museum ===
The Downieville Museum is in an 1852 stone building that was originally a general store, among other things, and was eventually donated to the city by its owner J.M.B. Meroux. With original iron doors and window shutters, it first housed a store that was built and operated by the Meroux family, whose gravestones are displayed prominently at the old Downieville cemetery. The museum displays local artifacts, historic items, pioneer portraits, and vintage photographs depicting the life of this community over 160 years, from its Gold Rush origins to the present day. It also displays a scale model of the turn-of-the-century Downieville business district and a replica of the 1,000 ounces (28 kg) Sierra County gold collection, a duplicate of the gold specimens and gold bars from Sierra County mines that are on display in the Los Angeles County Museum of Natural History.

=== Lodging ===
There are a variety of lodging choices in Downieville and its surroundings; some are on the North Fork Yuba River. They include Forest Service campgrounds, motels, bed and breakfast inns, rental cabins and backcountry campsites.

== Notable people ==
- Lewis Francis Byington, District Attorney of San Francisco
- Robert Lewis Byington, member of the California State Assembly
- Byington Ford, real estate developer and military officer
- Tirey L. Ford, 18th California Attorney General
- George E. Goodfellow, physician and naturalist who performed the first documented laparotomy
- Warren Harding, climber and member of the first team to climb El Capitan, Yosemite Valley, in 1958
- Joseph C. McKibbin, lawyer and politician
- Frank M. Proctor, member of the Nevada Senate
- Josefa Segovia, victim of lynching in Downieville

== Appearances in popular culture ==
Downieville was featured by Huell Howser in California's Gold Episode 212.

The second act of John Adams and Peter Sellars' opera Girls of the Golden West is set in Downieville, dramatizing the lynching of Josefa Segovia.

== Services ==
Downieville has its own post office; the town's ZIP code is 95936.

Wired telephone numbers for the town follow the format (530) 289-xxxx.

Downieville is home to The Mountain Messenger weekly newspaper. The paper began in 1853 as a twice-per-month publication; Mark Twain once wrote there under his real name, Sam Clemens. It is distributed through the U.S. mail and includes subscribers far beyond Sierra County.

== Geography ==
According to the United States Census Bureau, the CDP covers an area of 3.2 square miles (8.3 km^{2}), of which 99.83% is land and 0.17% is water. Most of the town is built on riverwash soils; higher locations are on Hurlbut gravelly loam or Deadwood gravelly sandy loam.

=== Climate ===
This region experiences warm (but not hot) and dry summers, with no average monthly temperatures above 71.6 °F or 22.0 °C. According to the Köppen Climate Classification system, Downieville has a warm-summer Mediterranean climate, abbreviated Csb on climate maps.

Climate data for Downieville, California (1991–2020 normals, extremes 1911–1930, 1946–present)
| Month | Jan | Feb | Mar | Apr | May | Jun | Jul | Aug | Sep | Oct | Nov | Dec | Year |
|---|---|---|---|---|---|---|---|---|---|---|---|---|---|
| Record high °F (°C) | 71 (22) | 78 (26) | 85 (29) | 96 (36) | 99 (37) | 107 (42) | 106 (41) | 109 (43) | 105 (41) | 97 (36) | 84 (29) | 74 (23) | 109 (43) |
| Mean daily maximum °F (°C) | 48.1 (8.9) | 52.3 (11.3) | 57.6 (14.2) | 63.3 (17.4) | 72.1 (22.3) | 81.3 (27.4) | 89.2 (31.8) | 88.6 (31.4) | 83.4 (28.6) | 71.8 (22.1) | 55.7 (13.2) | 46.2 (7.9) | 67.5 (19.7) |
| Daily mean °F (°C) | 39.0 (3.9) | 41.5 (5.3) | 45.3 (7.4) | 49.5 (9.7) | 57.0 (13.9) | 63.8 (17.7) | 70.2 (21.2) | 69.3 (20.7) | 64.7 (18.2) | 55.4 (13.0) | 44.3 (6.8) | 37.7 (3.2) | 53.1 (11.7) |
| Mean daily minimum °F (°C) | 29.9 (−1.2) | 30.7 (−0.7) | 33.0 (0.6) | 35.7 (2.1) | 41.8 (5.4) | 46.4 (8.0) | 51.3 (10.7) | 49.9 (9.9) | 45.9 (7.7) | 39.1 (3.9) | 33.0 (0.6) | 29.2 (−1.6) | 38.8 (3.8) |
| Record low °F (°C) | 1 (−17) | 2 (−17) | 10 (−12) | 14 (−10) | 26 (−3) | 28 (−2) | 35 (2) | 34 (1) | 25 (−4) | 19 (−7) | 17 (−8) | 1 (−17) | 1 (−17) |
| Average precipitation inches (mm) | 11.26 (286) | 10.73 (273) | 10.00 (254) | 5.34 (136) | 3.65 (93) | 1.07 (27) | 0.06 (1.5) | 0.19 (4.8) | 0.66 (17) | 3.34 (85) | 6.81 (173) | 11.81 (300) | 64.92 (1,649) |
| Average snowfall inches (cm) | 6.4 (16) | 7.9 (20) | 4.2 (11) | 1.2 (3.0) | 0.1 (0.25) | 0.0 (0.0) | 0.0 (0.0) | 0.0 (0.0) | 0.0 (0.0) | 0.1 (0.25) | 1.2 (3.0) | 5.1 (13) | 26.2 (67) |
| Average precipitation days (≥ 0.01 in) | 12.6 | 11.8 | 11.2 | 8.7 | 7.6 | 2.6 | 0.5 | 1.0 | 2.1 | 4.7 | 8.7 | 11.6 | 83.1 |
| Average snowy days (≥ 0.1 in) | 2.0 | 2.3 | 2.0 | 0.4 | 0.1 | 0.0 | 0.0 | 0.0 | 0.0 | 0.1 | 0.5 | 1.9 | 9.3 |
Source: NOAA

== Gallery ==
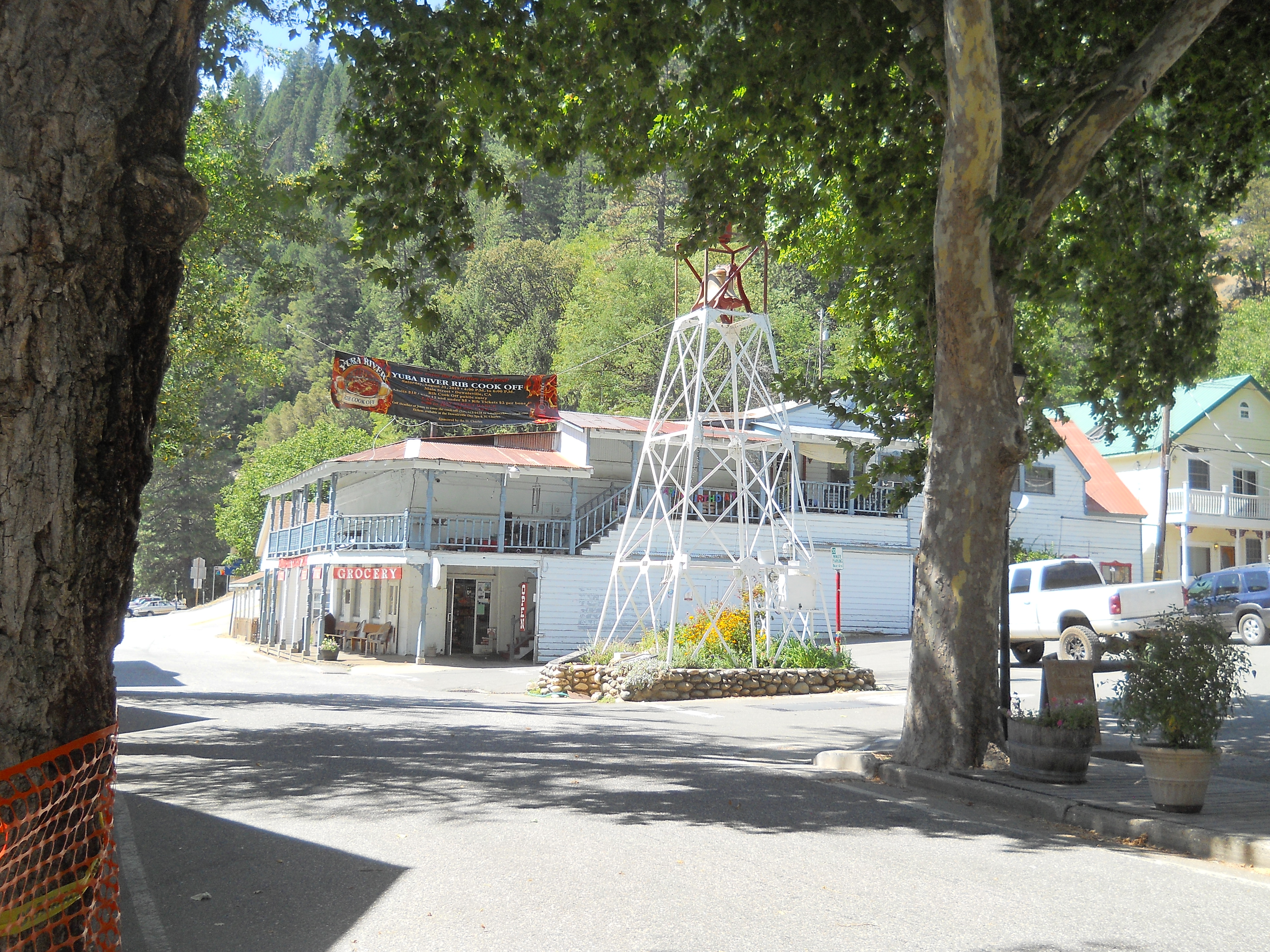
Downieville, 2019.

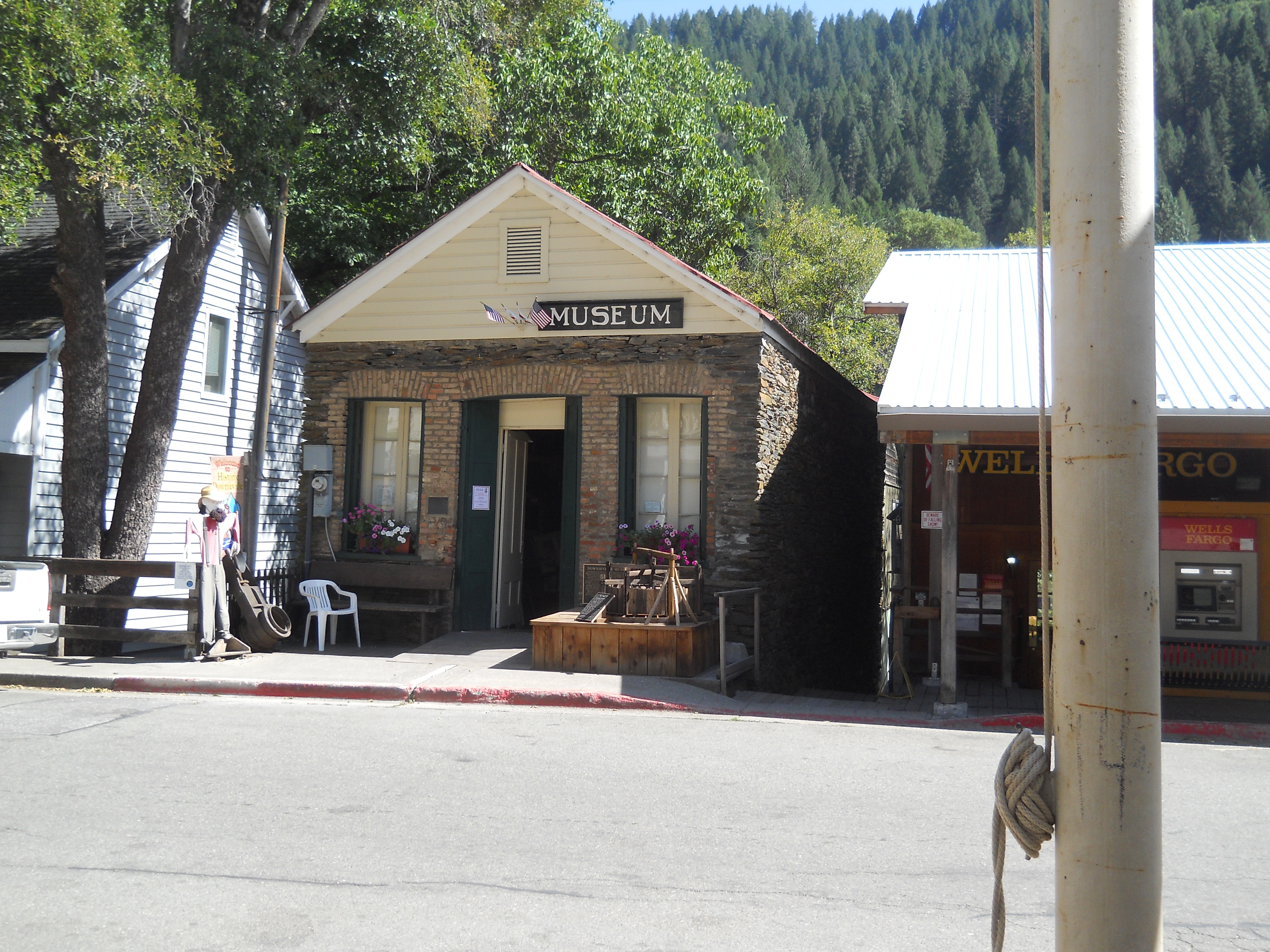
Museum, 2019.

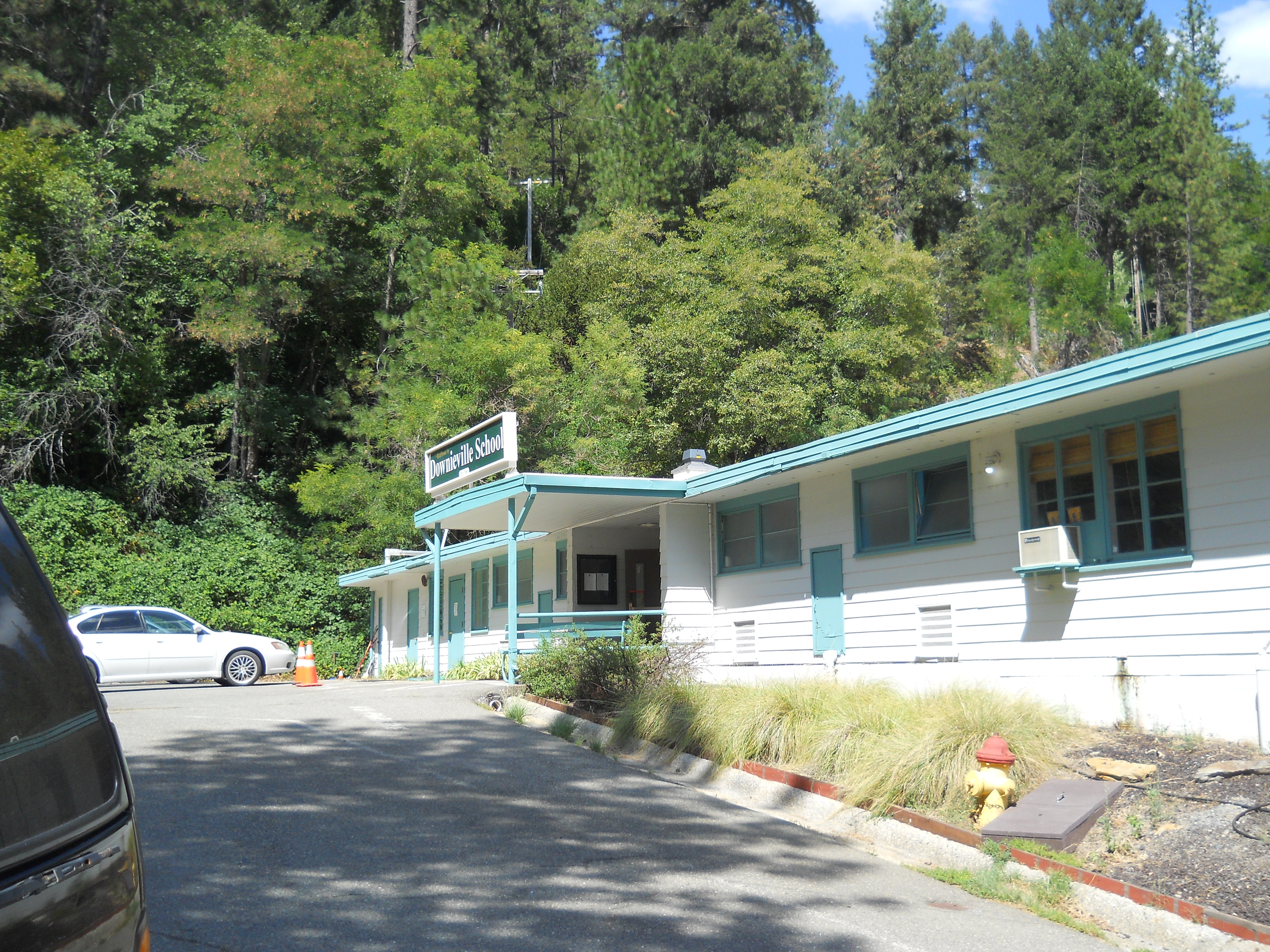
School, 2019.
