= Tirey L. Ford Jr. =

California business executive

Tirey L. Ford, Jr.
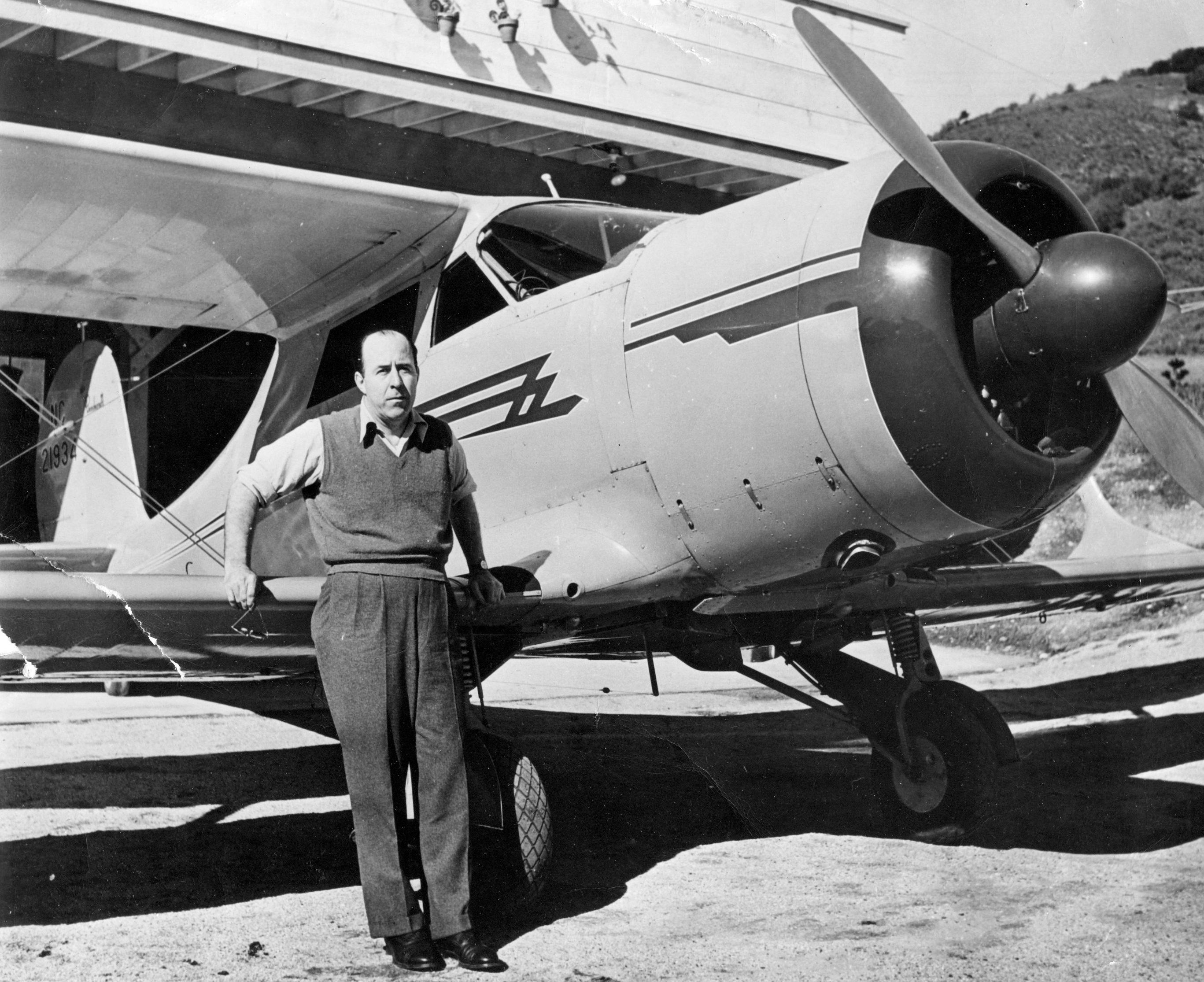
- Tirey Ford pictured with a Beechcraft Staggerwing airplane, circa 1945.

Personal details
- Born: Tirey Lafayette Ford; November 7, 1898 San Francisco, California
- Died: February 27, 1972 (aged 73) San Mateo, California
- Occupation: Businessman, aircraft pilot
- Known for: Co-developed the Carmel Valley Airfield, Carmel Valley Village, founded Insul-8 Corporation

Military service
- Allegiance: United States
- Branch/service: United States Merchant Marine; United States Navy
- Years of service: 1917–1919; 1941
- Rank: Lieutenant 1917; Lieutenant commander 1942

Tirey Lafayette Ford Jr. (November 7, 1898 – February 27, 1972) was an American businessman, aircraft pilot, vice president of Swayne & Hoyt steamship company, co-developed the Carmel Valley Airfield, Carmel Valley Village, and started the Insul-8 Corporation, which exists today as Conductix-Wampfler. His career in manufacturing, shipping, and aviation stretched more than fifty years.

Ford went to Santa Clara University. He invented and designed the Insulated 8-bar, which became the industry standard in crane electrification. In his retirement, Ford became an avid photographer and wrote technical articles for photographic magazines.

== Early life ==
Ford was born in San Francisco, California, the third child of state senator and former attorney general Tirey L. Ford and Mary Emma Byington.

Ford attended the preparatory high school at the Santa Clara University from 1915 to 1916. After high school, he went to the University of California, Berkeley but left to enter the United States Merchant Marine as a Lieutenant during World War I. He spent most of his time at sea. After World War I, Ford went back to college to get his degree from the University of California, graduating in 1921. During World War II, he was a Lieutenant commander for the Port Director of the United States Navy in San Francisco.

=== Marriage and children ===
Ford was married on January 23, 1929, in New York, to Elizabeth Boit Foster of Boston. They had one child, Elizabeth Boit Ford. On August 14, 1946, Ford married his second wife Helen Elizabeth Morrison of New York. She had one child from a previous marriage, Holly Cameron Gales.

== Career ==
In 1923, Ford worked for the American steamship company Swayne & Hoyt, based in San Francisco, California, that operated a fleet of steamships and were agents for American and foreign steamship companies. Ford started out as a dock worker and was a seaman and then as a mate on the Gulf Pacific mailship. In 1928 he became vice president of Swayne & Hoyt's Gulf Pacific Mail Line in San Francisco. In 1930, he became Executive Vice President, Director and Partner of the Swayne & Hoyt Lines. He was a principal stockholder of the company.

In March 1940, Ford and his associates sold the steamship business to the Yamashita Line. Ford was president of the San Francisco-based Propeller Club from 1939 to 1940, which represented shipping interests for the port of San Francisco. On July 20, 1939, there were one hundred charter members of the Propeller Club under the chairmanship of Tirey L. Ford, president of the port of San Francisco. In September 1940, Ford became president of the Hammond Aircraft Company of San Francisco. Hammond Aircraft was a subsidiary of Bowlus Sailplanes, Inc.

In 1941, he bought controlling interest in the Hammond Aircraft Company at the San Francisco International Airport, which for four years produced components for the Navy and the United States Army Air Corps during World War II.

Ford lived in the Monterey Peninsula and had a home in Pebble Beach and a working ranch in Carmel Valley. He raced a Mercury Class sloop at Pebble Beach and had a twin-engine pilot's rating. Ford's sister Relda Ford, was married to Samuel Finley Brown Morse, the developer of Pebble Beach.

Ford was involved in several Monterey Peninsula businesses, including being vice president and director of the Del Monte Properties Company until 1951. Ford spent time in Washington, D.C., negotiating the sale of the Hotel Del Monte to the Navy, now called the Naval Postgraduate School in Monterey, California.

In the 1941, Ford co-developed the 29-acre Carmel Valley Airfield with his brother Byington Ford, for pilot-owners who wanted their home to also serve as a hangar for their plane. During World War II, the airfield served as an alternative landing field for military planes flying out of Watsonville and King City, California. A nearby road was named after them called Ford Road.

In 1946, Tirey and his brother, Byington, developed the Carmel Valley Village and Airway Market, which were in walking distance of the Airpark. In the 2010 census Carmel Valley Village had a population of 4,407.

From 1945 through 1946, Ford was president of the Pacific Aircraft Company in Oakland, California, which had a five state Beechcraft distributorship for California, Nevada, Oregon, Arizona and Washington. They had sizable hangar and office space at the Oakland airport.

In 1947, Ford owner and co-founder of the Del Monte Aviation company at the Monterey Regional Airport. He was a Fixed-base operator that provided charter, maintenance and training services.

As chairman of the Sea-Air Committee, Ford acted as an advisor and spokesperson to support the operation of scheduled air services across oceans for major passenger steamship lines, including the Matson, American President Lines, United States Lines, and the Grace Lines.

On May 6, 1947, Ford representing the Sea-Air Committee, testified in Washington D.C. at the United States House of Representatives, that steamship companies have the right to operate aircraft for oversea air routes.

In 1950, Ford sold his holdings on the Monterey Peninsula and became president and director of the Benbow Manufacturing Company, of San Carlos, California, which he renamed to the Insul-8 Corporation in 1952. He was the largest stockholder of the company.

In December 1957, Insul-8 Corporation established an electronics division to manufacture closed-circuit television systems that were the first used at airports to monitor airplane traffic.

Ford was also president of the Super-V Aircraft Corporation in 1961. He was involved in a new aviation division that provided all the parts (except engines) for the conversion of a single-engine Beach Bonanza into a twin-engine, called the Super-V airplane. Parts for the conversion were manufactured by the Insul-8 Corporation. Super-V conversion centers operated under franchise from the Super-V Aircraft Corporation. The Bay Super V was an example of this kind of twin-engine conversion.

In February 1962, Insul-8 Corporation acquired the Sterling Manufacturing company of Belmont, California.

In July 1966, Rucker Company of Oakland, acquired Insul-8 Corporation for 138,000 shares of the Rucker stock valued at $5 million. Ford retired from Insul-8 in 1967, but stayed on at Rucker as director and consultant. Insul-8 Corporation was later acquired by the Delachaux Group in 1975. In 1997, Delachaux merged with Conductix and in 2007, acquired Wampfler, creating Conductix-Wampfler that still exists today.

=== Retirement ===
In his retirement, Ford became a photographer. He wrote technical articles for photographic magazines. Some of his photographs were displayed in the New York Metropolitan Museum of Art. Ford is listed as showing portrait studies of the dancer Katherine Dunham, at the San Francisco Museum of Modern Art. He started a micro-photography project to study various aspects of cancer treatment. Ford was a member of the Pacific-Union Club and the Burlingame County Club.

Ford became director of Trader Vic's Restaurant in 1970. In 1972, he helped reorganize the Virginia and Truckee Railroad as a historic project between the two cities.

== Death ==
On February 27, 1972, Ford died at his Hillsborough, California home due to Cancer. He was 73 years old. There were no funeral services. He was interred at the main mausoleum at the Holy Cross Cemetery in Colma, California.
