= T. A. Rottanzi =

American physician

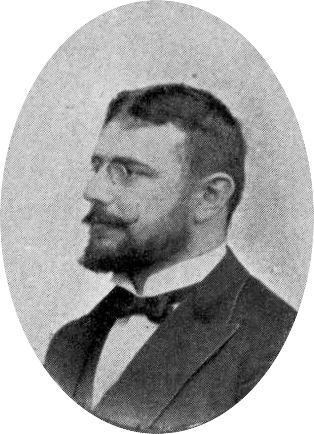
- Rottanzi in 1897

Member of the San Francisco Board of Supervisors from Ward 7
- In office January 1897 – January 1899
- Preceded by: Christopher Dunker
- Succeeded by: Lewis Byington

Personal details
- Born: 1867 San Francisco
- Died: 1911 (aged 43–44) San Francisco

Tullio Antonio Rottanzi (1867–1911) was an American physician who served on the San Francisco Board of Supervisors in the late 19th century and was noted for introducing a law that banned the wearing of tall hats in theaters. As a short-term acting mayor he sought out ways of cutting indolence and waste in city government, and during a city crisis in which two boards of supervisors claimed to hold power, he was the only person serving on both bodies.

== Biography ==
Rottanzi was born in 1867 in San Francisco and was graduated from Boys High School and Cooper Medical College in that city. He did postgraduate work in Italy.

Rottanzi was also a pharmacist, and in 1895 he was living at 301 Third Street, where he was operating the Old South Park Statuary Drug Store. He was a partner there with Giosue Rottanzi, "a prominent member of the Swiss Italian colony."

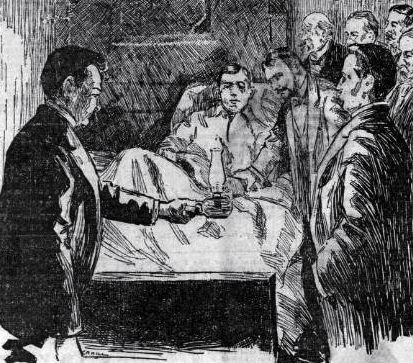
Doctors gather to examine boxer Tom Sharkey in December 1896.

He was one of the "physicians of prominence" who examined boxer Tom Sharkey after his December 1896 "world championship" fight with Bob Fitzsimmons in Mechanic's Pavilion, San Francisco, a day after Sharkey had to quit the fight because of an injury.

In May 1898, Rottanzi was a member of a medical board to examine the men who were volunteering to join the Army in the first days of the Spanish–American War. He left the Board of Supervisors to take this duty and in June 1898, his fellow board members presented him with "a costly gold-mounted saber" as a farewell present.

In an October 11, 1903, San Francisco Chronicle feature titled "The Strong Men of San Francisco," Rottanzi was listed among a score of other San Franciscans as "Among those best known in the community and who have shown superior strength and endurance, or both."

He was married in 1906 or 1908 to Alice Deming, the daughter of Mrs. J.G. Deming of San Francisco, and they lived at 965 Union Street.

He died of "typhoid pneumonia" at the age of forty-three on January 20, 1911, in the German Hospital in San Francisco, and a funeral service was held on January 23 at Saints Pietro and Paolo Church on Filbert Street at Grant Avenue. Interment was at Holy Cross Cemetery, Colma.

== Public service ==
=== Schools ===
Rottanzi made an unsuccessful bid for the board of directors of the San Francisco city school system in 1894.

=== Community activities ===
In June 1895, he was elected president of the newly formed South Side Improvement Association, which had as its goals "better and cleaner streets," the conversion of Folsom Street into a boulevard and rerouting of the city's annual Fourth of July parade through the South Side. Meetings were held in his home at 301 Third Street.

=== Lodge and church ===
Rottanzi was a member of Pacific Parlor, Native Sons of the Golden West. In 1897 he made news by resigning as lead baritone in St. Mary's Church when he became "aggrieved at what he considers an affront from the Paulist Fathers" in a letter sent to Supervisor J.E. Britt. In it, M. Otis complained on behalf of the order about Rottanzi's opposition to "law and morality" as a member of the Board of Supervisors. "Long have I sung free gratis for that church," Rottanzi said, "but never again shall my voice make its walls ring."

=== Board of Supervisors ===
==== Election ====
Rottanzi was elected supervisor of the 7th Ward in 1896. In his required public report of expenses he swore that he had spent $116.35 on the campaign: $72 to the Democratic Purity Committee, $14 for printing, $7.75 for painting signs, $2.60 for cloth, $5 for a banner, and $15 for signs. He took office in January 1897 and won his position as head of the finance committee in a caucus of the Democratic supervisors.

==== Board crisis ====
In September 1897 Mayor James D. Phelan engineered what was called a coup d'etat in persuading Governor James Budd, a fellow Democrat, to replace the serving Board of Supervisors with all new, Democratic members, except for Rottanzi, who was nevertheless shifted from the 7th to the 10th Ward. Upon learning that he would retain his board membership, Rottanzi "lost interest" in appealing the governor's decision to the courts and "was as cheerful as a clam at high tide yesterday, and last evening delighted his associates in the meeting of the committee of the whole with his bubbling good humor."

His good humor, however, dampened when he learned that Mayor Phelan had named him to the supervisors' Health and Public Safety Committee, where he refused to serve. It was said "in official circles" that Phelan had become jealous of Rottanzi and "jumped at the chance to put him on the bone heap of an obscure committee."

In one of the first meetings of the new board, in September 1897, Rottanzi offered a motion that it be the "sense of this Board that none of the present employes of the city government be removed except for cause." He said that as the new Board was known to be a reform body, he thought it would be "the proper thing" to declare in favor of civil service. His motion was defeated, 7 to 4.

The next month, however, a State Supreme Court decision ended the reign of the new board and the former supervisors, including Rottanzi, were returned to their seats.

==== Positions ====
===== High hats =====
In March 1897 Rottanzi introduced an ordinance designed to ban "unduly large hats" worn by people attending the city's theaters. The proposed ordinance, which because of its nature affected only women, stated that:

No person shall wear any hat or bonnet or other head covering within any licensed theater . . . during the rendition of any programme on the stage or platform . . ., but every such hat, bonnet or other head covering shall be removed from the head by the person wearing the same during the time of performance . . .; provided, however, that the above inhibition shall not be held to include skullcaps, lace coverings or other small or closely fitting headdress or covering which does not interfere with or obstruct the view of the stage or platform.

Alfred Bouvier of the Baldwin and California theaters, who was "said to be the prime mover in the high hat agitation in this country," favored the proposal, saying that "we have many, many complaints from people inconvenienced by immense headgear," but noting that "The women have acceded very gracefully to the general request and have removed large hats." S.H. Friedlander of the Columbia Theater, however, "looked upon the Rottanzi order as an unwarranted invasion of privacy and said he, for one, would never aid voluntarily in its enforcement." "I don't think men know enough about such things to legislate on them," he said. ". . . a lady knows best when she looks well."

Rottanzi's proposal was roundly criticized by the supervisors' Finance Committee, which stated in its report:

It is an interference with personal rights and is not in the category of a police or sanitary regulation. . . . Only to fancy that a lady unconscious of any objections to her head covering should, after the performance, be placed under arrest by an officer, because, unfortunately, she sat in front of an irascible individual whose stature, physical or mental, made her presence objectionable, even with a duck of a bonnet, then to be required to be escorted to the police station . . . What crusty old or young bachelor devised this attack upon the ladies?

On March 22, 1897, the supervisors defeated the ordinance, 9 to 3, but after a delay of two weeks, it was passed unanimously.

===== Acting mayor =====
In June 1897 the Board of Supervisors appointed Rottanzi to the position of acting mayor during a short absence of James D. Phelan, and as such the councilman concerned himself with waste and indolence in city government. The day he was appointed, "he took a stroll about the City Hall, visiting a number of offices for the purpose of ascertaining whether the officials and employes were performing their duties." His report on conditions in the health department and the city recorder's office was mocked by fellow Supervisor C.A. Clinton, who said that "the farce of playing Mayor by the Supervisor from the Seventh ward has lasted long enough. He has, in the few days he acted for the Mayor, made himself ridiculous . . . the laughing stock of the community." Rottanzi replied that Clinton was "burning up with jealousy."

As acting mayor, he also discovered that the city's Board of Health had been collecting fees from the public under cover of an ordinance which had been passed by the previous city council but was vetoed by Mayor Phelan, whose veto was sustained by the new council.

===== Insanity Commission =====
As the supervisors' finance committee chair, Rottanzi believed that the city's Insanity Commission was becoming an "expensive luxury" and at one point he refused to pay the bills submitted by the commissioners and insisted on finding out "how many of the persons brought before the commission were simply 'drunks' or simple-minded persons found in the city jails or picked up by policemen upon the streets." He urged that two physicians be appointed to do the job of the commissioners to save money for the city.

===== Public begging =====
He was opposed to public begging, and in a letter addressed to Police Chief Mills said that people selling pencils "simply made a bunch of pencils an excuse to intrude on pedestrians and the occupants of offices, to their great inconvenience and the discomfort of the public."

===== County hospital =====
Rottanzi urged the incineration of the old county hospital buildings when a new hospital structure was completed, saying that such a "conflagration would destroy all the disease germs." He said Fire Chief Sullivan agreed with the idea.

=== Board of Health ===
In March 1902, Mayor James D. Phelan ousted the entire Board of Health because it had been promulgating a campaign against bubonic fever, including what the mayor called "The roping and the farcical fencing in of Chinatown," and he appointed a new board, including Rottanzi.

=== City physician ===
In 1907, Rottanzi was an official San Francisco city physician.
