= Josefa Segovia =

American lynching victim

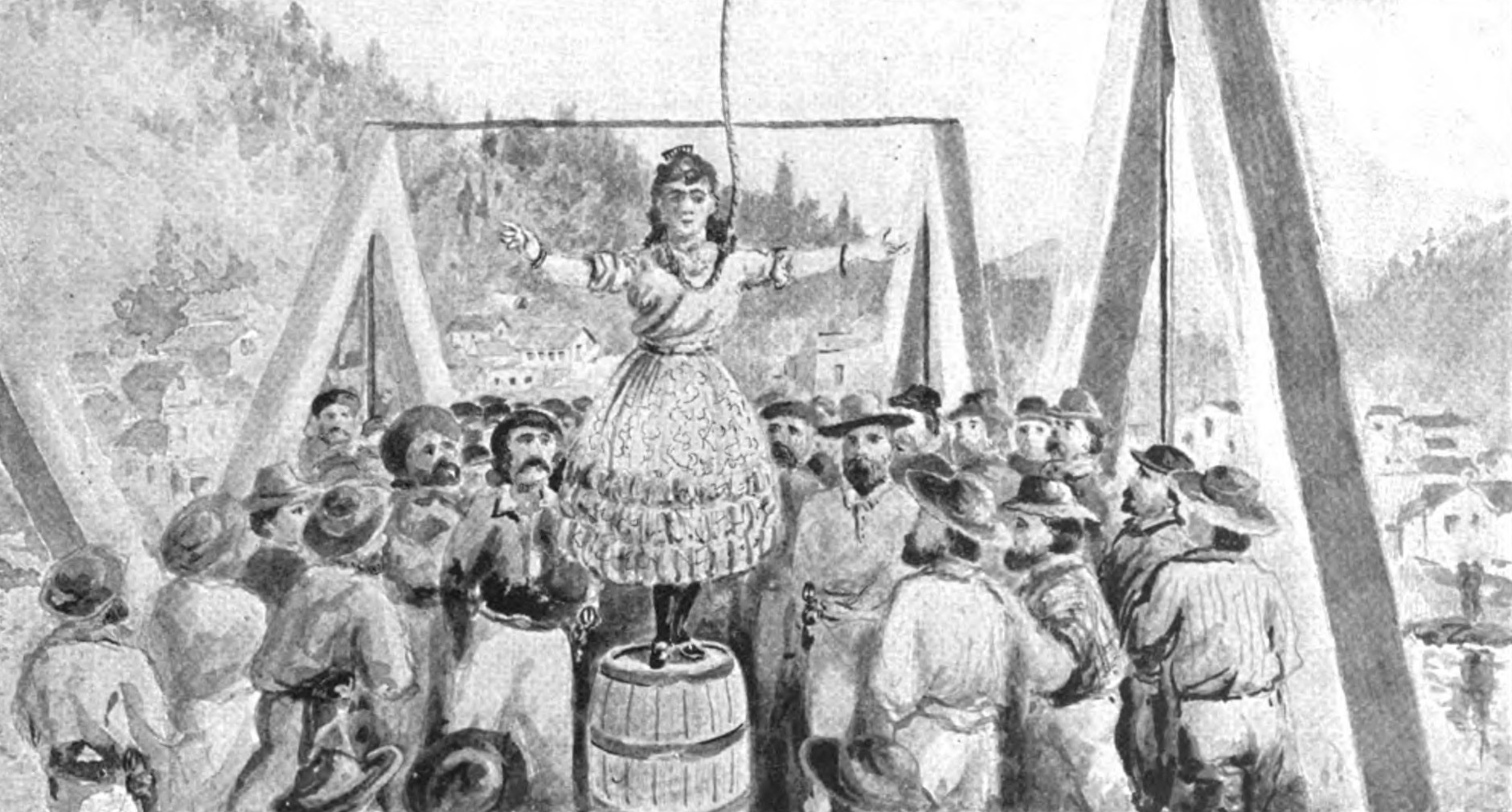
- Artist's impression of Segovia's hanging, from William Downie's Hunting for Gold, published 1893
- Location: 39°34′03″N 120°48′44″W; Downieville, California, U.S.
- Date: July 5, 1851; 175 years ago

Josefa Segovia, also known as Juanita or Josefa Loaiza, was a Californio (Mexican-Californian) woman who was lynched by hanging in Downieville, California, United States, on July 5, 1851. She is known as the first recorded Mexican woman to be lynched in California. Josefa is also an important figure in Chicana feminist theory as her case highlights the violence that Mexican women were facing at the time and the resistance against it.

== Historical background ==
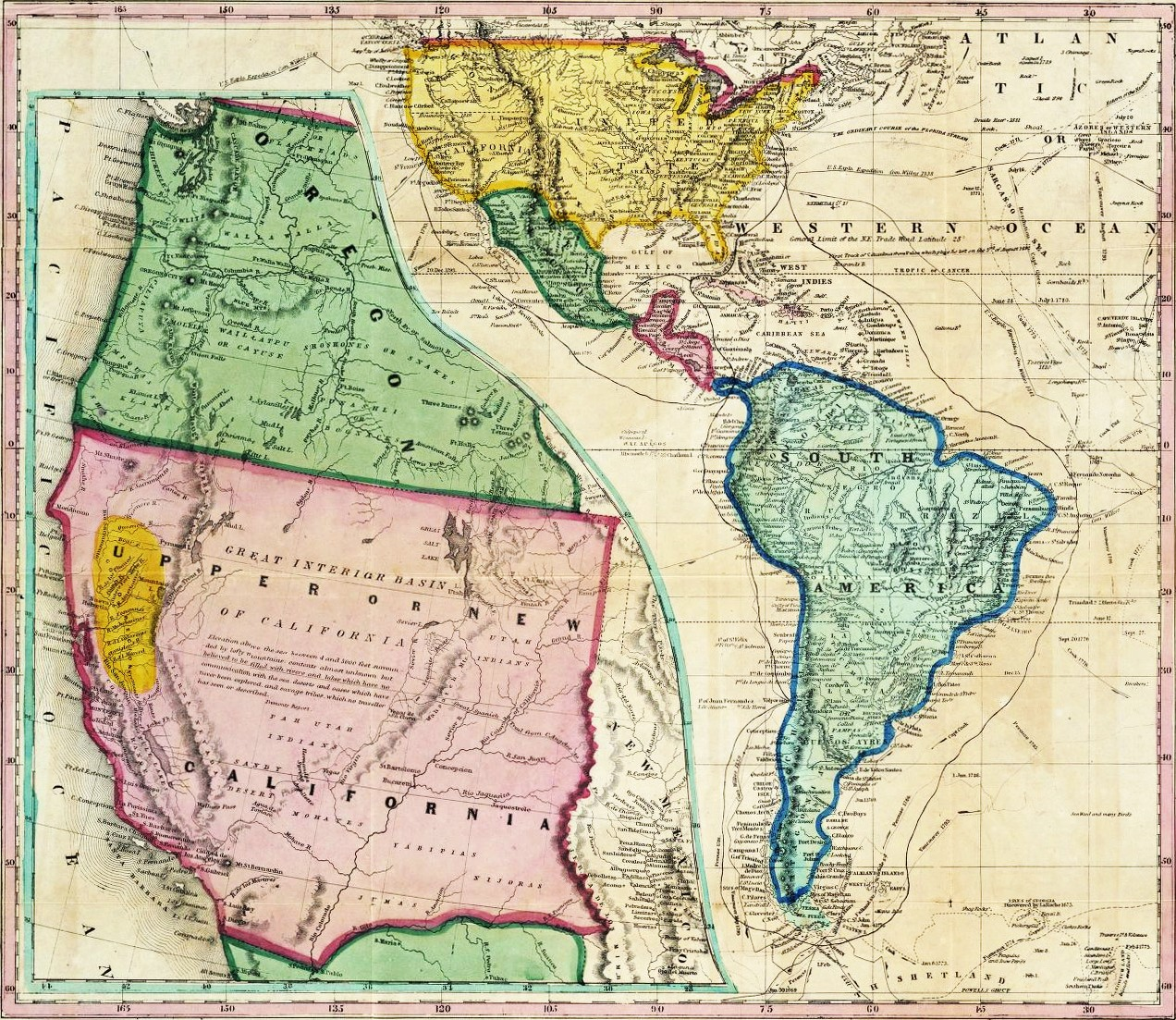
Map of California during the Gold Rush

Beginning in 1835, a dispute between Mexican and Anglo migrants was growing over western territories such as California, creating racial and gendered tensions which led to the lynching of Josefa. While it was Mexican territory, the Great Migration created a sentiment in the Anglo migrant populations to annex the territory into the USA leading to the Mexican-American War.

Josefa Segovia
- Born: c. 1821-1825; Mexico
- Died: July 5, 1851 (aged 22-25); Downieville, California U.S.
- Other names: Josefa Loaiza, Juanita
- Known for: Lynching victim

In 1848, right before the Mexican-American war ended, gold was found in California. This started the Gold Rush (1848–1852) and resulted in as many as 25,000 Mexicans, 30,000 Anglo-Americans, and migrants from countries in Asia and Latino America migrating to California to mine. By 1849, the population of non-native Californians grew to over 100,000. Two-thirds of this non-native population were Americans. Despite the fact that the work of mining was the hardest kind of labor, the promise of gold drew miners west every year. But the war had resulted in lasting tensions between Mexicans and Anglos, resulting in discriminatory policies such as the miner's tax.

The way women were seen in the West during the Gold Rush was also very much based on their wealth and their race. A majority of Anglo women who migrated West stayed in San Francisco, as it held more social and financial stability for them. The women who stayed in mining towns were more likely to be Mexican, Asian, or Chilean. These women were also a visible minority in a mining town's population, which exposed them to greater forms of sexual harassment. Rojas, a modern-day scholar, cites these as contributing factors that made Josefa more vulnerable to attack.

== Known facts about her case ==
On July 4, 1851, an Anglo-American miner named Frederick Cannon broke into the home of Josefa. Accounts of the time reported that she was not assaulted. Other accounts from historians say Cannon broke down her door and harassed her.

The next day, on July 5, 1851, her partner José Segovia confronted Cannon, who then followed José home and yelled profanities at both Josefa and Jose. This altercation ended with Josefa stabbing Cannon. A mob of the Anglo-American miners in Downieville, CA then gathered and held an extrajudicial trial where they decided Josefa was guilty. On that night, Josefa was hanged on the Jersey Bridge on the Yuba River.

=== Speculation and uncertainty ===
Josefa Segovia is the only known woman in California to have been lynched. However, the historical record of lynchings is incomplete. The original records for lynchings were categorized solely as having Black or White victims, erasing a history of violence against Mexicans. Additionally, violence against Mexican women was not reported as commonly as violence against white women. So while Josefa is the only recorded woman lynched in California, there could be more.

There is much speculation about why Josefa stabbed Cannon. Writing in 1887, Hubert Howe Bancroft, a historian of the time, reported that Cannon kicked down Josefa's door while he was drunk, but left without assaulting her. However, modern day scholars, including William D. Carrigan and Maythee Rojas, generally agree that when Cannon knocked down Josefa's door, he was actively attempting to assault or harass her.

Similarly, the details of the following day, July 5, are unclear. Some accounts of the story claim Cannon returned to Josefa's house to apologize for his behavior. Other scholars say he returned to fight with her husband, José Segovia (Loaiza), who confronted Cannon for breaking into Josefa's and his home. All accounts conclude that the altercation ultimately led to Cannon calling Josefa a "whore", and Josefa subsequently stabbing him.

== Historical and Popular Accounts ==
A lot of the speculation about her name comes from older dramatized versions of her story being told. Newspaper accounts at the time wrote negatively of her. But by the 19th and 20th century, her story was retold by historians or important men of the era. This led to a lot of the speculation modern day historians are reading through.

=== Trial ===
Gordon Young, an American novelist, rewrote Josefa Segovia's case in his book Days of '49, which dramatized the original details. The novel portrays the extrajudicial trial held in Downieville. In the novel, Young claims there was a jury of Cannon's peers in his description of the trial. He also wrote of a physician testifying against the hanging of Josefa. Protests immediately followed the doctor's testimony, and he was forced from the stand and driven from the town. Young also wrote about a lawyer, Mr. Thayer from Nevada, who attempted to testify against the execution of Josefa but was beaten off the stand. Reportedly, Thayer asked for a fair trial for Josefa to see if a murder had really been committed. The novel, because of its popularity, was later confused as a true account of the case.

=== Execution ===
Another book, Popular Tribunals, Vol 1, was also influential in spreading dramatized information about her case. The book described how the townspeople stood on the banks of the river to watch her execution. Hubert Howe Bancroft claims that her lynching was an important event to lessen the anger of the townspeople over Cannon's death. Josefa was hanged immediately following the trial, and some newspaper accounts of the time, along with Bancroft, say that her last words before she was executed were, "Adiós, Señores". Some witnesses recalled Josefa saying before she died, "'I would do the same again if I was so provoked", and placing the noose on her own neck. Due to conflicting witness statements and vague details, some modern commentators believe that Josefa did not murder Frederick Cannon.

== Legacy ==
Josefa's case has been a focus for the Chicana Feminist scholar and historian Maythee Rojas in her article "Remembering Josefa: Reading the Mexican Female Body in California Gold Rush Chronicles." She tells how Josefa was portrayed as a violent woman until she was executed, and how later newspaper accounts changed to depict her as an innocent woman. Josefa Segovia's case is a major plot point in Girls of the Golden West, a 2017 opera by John Adams based on the letters of Dame Shirley. She is also the main protagonist in the short film Siren (2019) by Jared Armijo-Wardle. The short film portrays Josefa during her final moments, before her hanging.
