= The Mountain Messenger =

Weekly newspaper published in Downieville, California

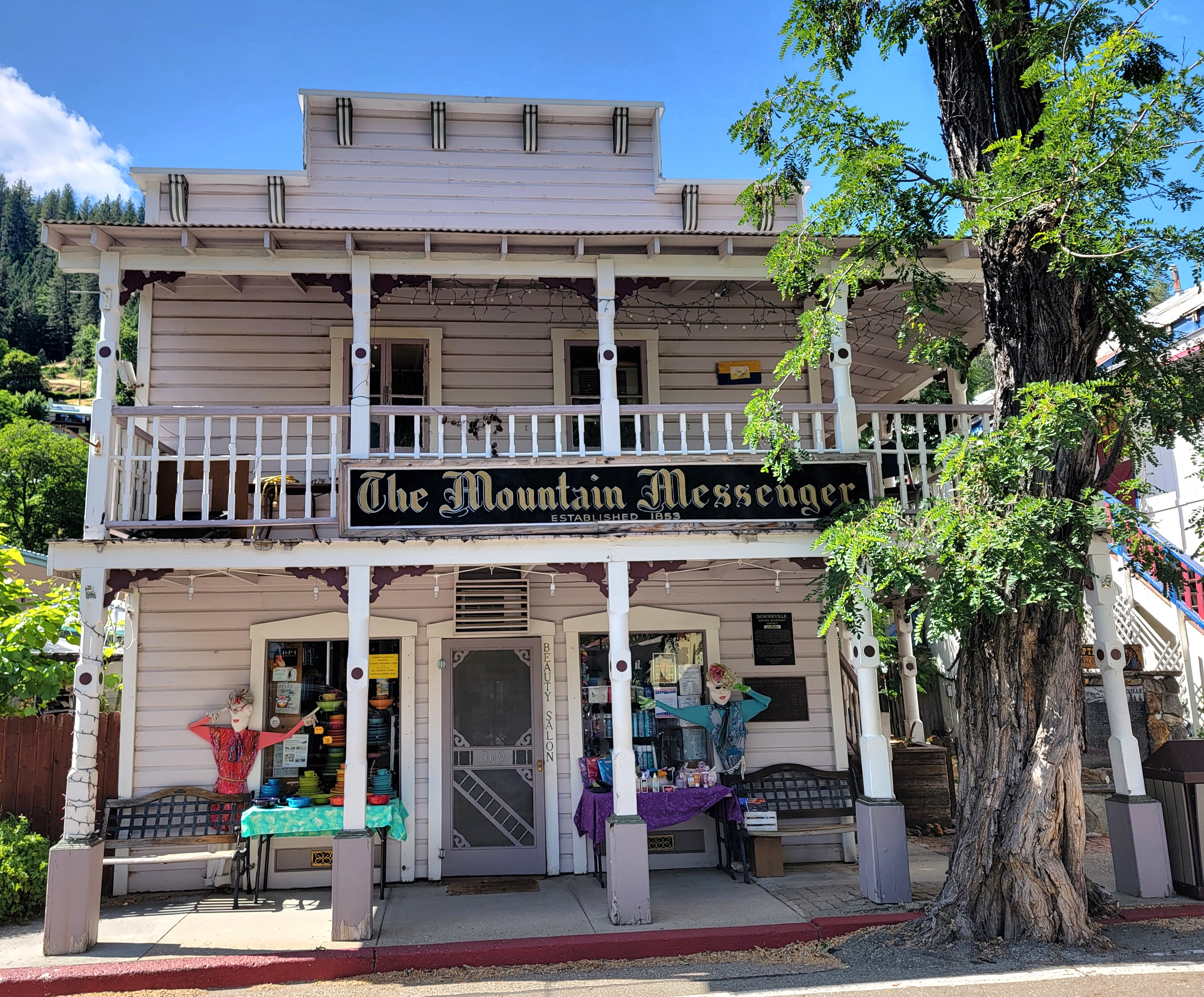
The Mountain Messenger building, Downieville, California

The Mountain Messenger is an American weekly newspaper, published on Thursdays in Downieville, California, and covering Sierra and Plumas Counties. Founded in 1853, it is said to be the oldest continuously published weekly newspaper in California.

== History ==
The newspaper was first published in Gibsonville on November 19, 1853, as The Trumpet, a semi-monthly printed on the premises of The Marysville Herald. It became The Mountain Messenger the following May, and in fall 1855 moved to La Porte, where the office was destroyed when the town burned on July 27, 1861, but the equipment was sufficiently undamaged for publication not to be interrupted. With the issue of April 2, 1864, it moved again to Downieville. There it was housed in several buildings until moving in 1943 to the Masonic Building on Commercial Street; in the 21st century it occupies the upper floor of the Mackerman & Co. Building, built of stone in 1852 and originally a home and brewery. Printing was done locally on a hand-operated press until 1964, when it was moved to Grass Valley. The Messenger was then printed in Quincy from the late 1990s until 2024, when the printing company discontinued newspaper printing; since then the paper has been printed in Marysville at the facilities of the Appeal-Democrat.

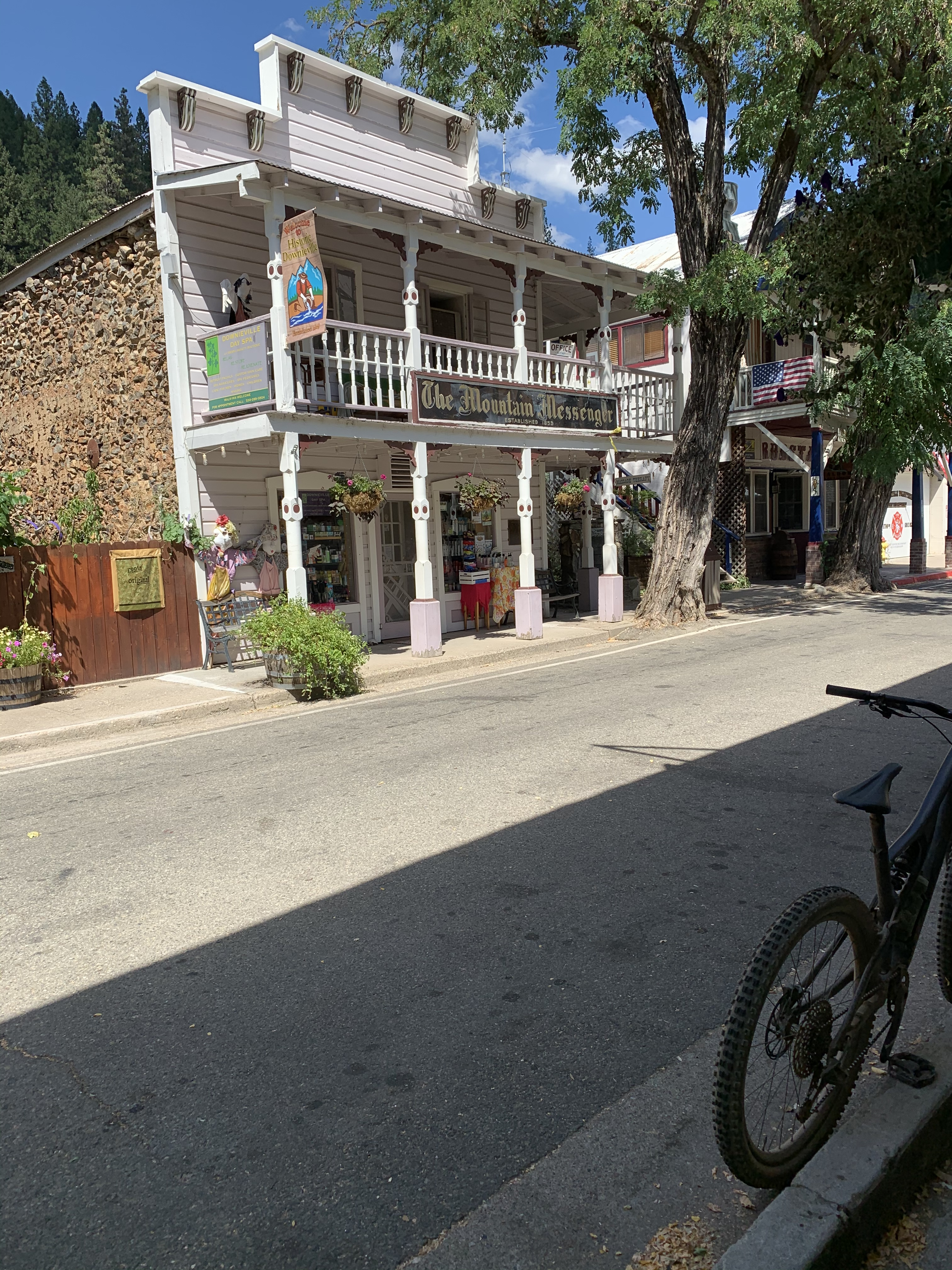
1852 building housing The Mountain Messenger

The founding editor was named Heade; in 1854 Alfred Helm became the editor, and was joined by William S. Byrnes, J. A. Vaughn, and E. M. Dewey. In 1864, soon after moving The Mountain Messenger to Downieville, they bought the remaining assets of The Sierra Democrat, most of whose equipment had been destroyed in a fire that February. Vaughn and Downer remained the publishers until 1894, when William Eschbacher became part-owner and then editor and manager of the Messenger; in February 1895 it was incorporated. Eschbacher moved out of the area in 1904 and H. S. Tibby, who had joined the paper in 1893, was the editor after Downer left, until his retirement in 1929. A series of editors followed, beginning with T. Ayers in 1920–1934, until Eugene T. Stowe, former publisher of a newspaper in Woodland, became editor and publisher on November 1, 1943; he bought up the stock and was sole owner as well until he died in 1964. Peter Ingram of Grass Valley bought the newspaper from Stowe's widow in 1966; it was sold in early 1971 to David Neuharth and his wife, with Neuharth also becoming the editor the following year.

In the 1980s Don Russell, a Vietnam War draft dodger who previously worked as a forester in the Sierras and a fishing boat owner in Alaska, became the publisher and editor; he became co-owner in the early 1990s. In 1970, paid circulation was 900; as of January 2019, 200 copies were delivered locally and there was one other employee. Russell refused to have a website for The Mountain Messenger, to cover beauty pageants, or to have children's photographs on the front page.

In January 2020, Russell announced his retirement as editor-publisher; he was succeeded by Carl Butz, who said he wanted to make the paper a non-profit. At that time paid circulation was about 2,400. Butz's becoming the editor is the subject of a 2022 documentary short film, Carl Runs the Paper, which was shown at the Flathead Lake International Cinemafest in February 2023.

Under Butz's ownership, the Messenger added a website. In September 2023, Butz announced that Ryan Steinwert had become the editor, with Butz continuing as publisher. Butz transferred ownership to Steinwert in November 2026.

== Distinctions ==
The Mountain Messenger is reputedly the oldest weekly in California. Mark Twain is said to have written for and edited the paper; Russell said that he had found a few short columns under Twain's real name, Sam Clemens, written after he had to leave Nevada in a hurry for agreeing to a duel. As of November 2017, it still prints the price of gold each week.

== Further information ==
- Huell Howser, California's Gold Episode 212, "Lost Sierra", Huell Howser Productions in association with KCET, Los Angeles, 1991 (video, 28 mins.), OCLC 719620255.
