= Noah Henry Byington =

American physician

- Born: September 26, 1809; Bristol, Connecticut, U.S.
- Died: December 29, 1877 (aged 68); Southington, Connecticut, U.S.
- Occupations: Physician, politician

Noah Henry Byington (September 26, 1809 – December 29, 1877) was an American medical doctor and politician.

Byington was born in Bristol, Connecticut, in 1809, the son of town surveyor Noah Byington. His medical studies were begun with his elder brother, Charles Byington, M. D., of Bristol, and continued in New Haven and Philadelphia.

On receiving his degree from Yale Medical School in 1834, Byington began the practice of his profession in Wolcott, Connecticut, where he resided until 1849. He removed to Southington, where he continued in active service until the attack of diphtheria which closed his life after a fortnight's illness. He had represented both Wolcott and Southington in the Connecticut State Legislature, and had taken special interest in all educational matters.

Byington married Parlia (Parley) Perkins. Their son Franklin Benjamin Byington was a businessman in Bristol. Byington died in Southington, in 1877, aged 68 years.
