= Poverty Hill, California =

Unincorporated community in California, United States

Coordinates: 39°37′21″N 121°00′25″W

Poverty Hill is an unincorporated community in Sierra County, California, United States.
