= Robert Lewis Byington =

Democratic, California State Assembly, 24th District

Lewis Byington
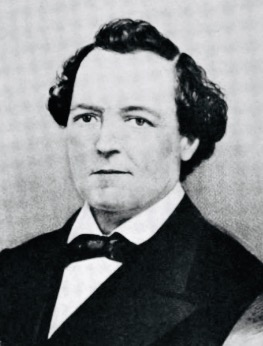

Member of the California State Assembly for the 24th district
- In office 1877–1878
- Preceded by: George W. Giffen
- Succeeded by: Jeremiah Levee

Member of the Sierra County Board of Supervisors
- In office 1875–1877
- In office 1867–1870

Personal details
- Born: January 29, 1820 Southington, Connecticut, U.S.
- Died: May 7, 1886 (aged 66) San Francisco, California, U.S.
- Party: Democratic
- Spouse: Catherine Alice Freehill (m. 1857)
- Children: 8, including Lewis

Robert Lewis Byington (January 29, 1820 – June 20, 1886) was an American politician who served in the California State Assembly from 1877 until 1878 as a member of the Democratic Party. He was also a member of the Sierra County Board of Supervisors from 1867 until 1870 and from 1875 until 1877. Byington was one of the early pioneers of Sierra County.

== Early life ==
Byington was born in Southington, Connecticut on June 29, 1820. His parents were Zebulon Byington and Abigail Webster Byington.

When he was young, the family moved to Cincinnati, Ohio, where he was raised and attended public school. Byington left Cincinnati and went by ship to California around Cape Horn, reaching San Francisco on April 29, 1852. Seeking the discovery of gold in California, he moved to the mining district in the Sierra Nevada, going first to Dutch Flat and then to Goodyears Bar and Monte Cristo in Sierra County.

On November 23, 1857, Byington married Catherine Alice Freehill at Forest City, California. They had eight children, including Lewis Francis Byington.

In 1862, Byington settled at Downieville. He was a butcher by trade and made a living in mining and stock raising and owned farm land in Colusa County, California.

== Political career ==
Byington was a member of the Democratic Party and was elected Sheriff of Sierra County. From 1867 until 1870 and from 1875 until 1877, he was a member of the board of supervisors of Sierra County.

From 1877 until 1878, Byington was a member of the California State Assembly, representing the 24th district.

== Death ==
Byington died in San Francisco on June 30, 1886, aged 66 years old.
