= Lewis Francis Byington =

Democratic, District Attorney of San Francisco

Lewis F. Byington
- Byington c. 1902

17th District Attorney of San Francisco
- In office January 8, 1900 – January 8, 1906
- Preceded by: Daniel J. Murphy
- Succeeded by: William H. Langdon

Member of the San Francisco Board of Supervisors from the 7th Ward
- In office January 3, 1899 – January 8, 1900
- Preceded by: T. A. Rottanzi
- Succeeded by: Ward districts abolished

Personal details
- Born: Lewis Francis Byington; May 24, 1868
- Died: May 7, 1943 (aged 74) San Francisco, California
- Resting place: Holy Cross Mausoleum
- Party: Democratic
- Profession: Lawyer

Lewis Francis Byington (May 24, 1868 – May 7, 1943) was an American lawyer, author, and Democratic Party politician who served on the San Francisco Board of Supervisors from 1899 to 1900 and as District Attorney of San Francisco from 1900 to 1906.

== Early life and education ==
Byington was born on May 24, 1868, in Downieville, California. He was the son of Robert Lewis Byington and Catherine Freehill Byington.

Byington went to public school in Downieville. He graduated from Santa Clara College, now the University of Santa Clara. In 1887, he graduated from the University of California Hastings College of the Law. He subsequently practiced law in San Francisco.

== Career ==
Lewis Byington was a member of the California bar. He practiced in the Supreme Court and Federal Courts of California.

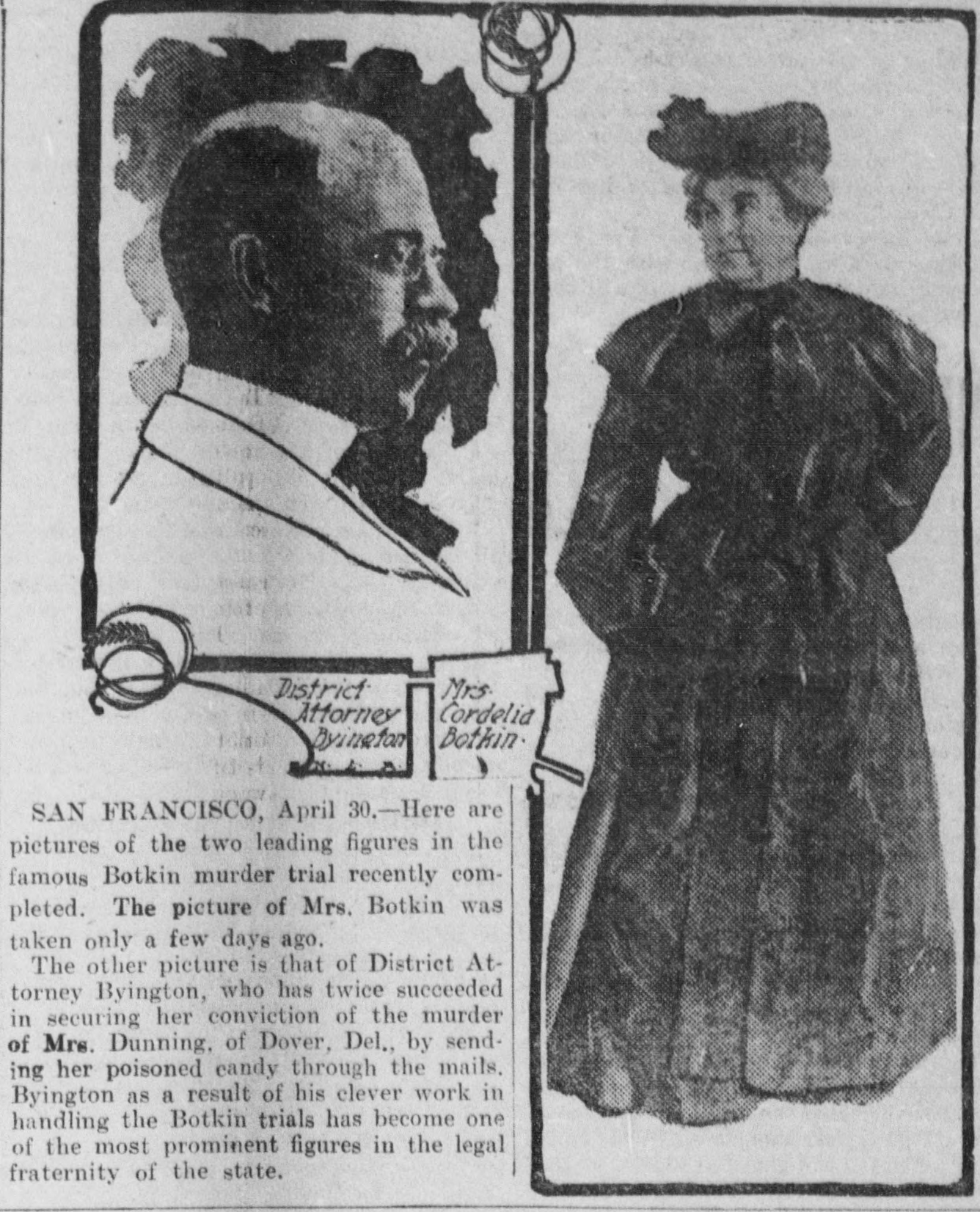
Botkin and Byington

=== San Francisco government ===
In 1898, Byington was elected to the San Francisco Board of Supervisors.

On November 8, 1899, he was elected San Francisco District Attorney, serving from 1900 until 1906. As District Attorney, he prosecuted the murderer Cordelia Botkin. He was re-elected twice.

Byington was president of the San Francisco Civil Service Commission under Mayor James Rolph.

== Private life and affiliations ==
Byington was unmarried. In retirement, he made his home in San Francisco.

He was vice president of the California Historic Landmarks League and served as president of the Native Sons of the Golden West (NSGW). On September 15, 1912, Byington acted as chairman of the ceremonies during the dedication of the new NSGW building. He addressed the audience during the dedication, describing the history and challenges of its completion.

== Death ==
On May 7, 1943, Byington died of pneumonia at Stanford Hospital in San Francisco. He was buried at the Holy Cross Mausoleum.

== Publications ==
Byington wrote the following books:

- Byington, Lewis Francis (1931). The History of San Francisco. S. J. Clarke. OCLC 9592779. OL 6768917M.
- Byington, Lewis Francis. Downieville and its Historic Past. OCLC 83751114.
- Byington, Lewis Francis. Sierra County and its Historic Past. OCLC 54234050.

== See also ==
San Francisco District Attorneys
