= Byington Ford =

American cartoonist

- Ford, ca. 1942

Personal details
- Born: Lewis Byington Ford; November 1, 1890 Downieville, California, U.S.
- Died: January 19, 1985 (aged 94) Ventura, California, U.S.
- Spouse(s): Marion Boisot; Ruth Arlen
- Children: 3
- Parent(s): Tirey L. Ford; Mary Emma Byington
- Occupation: Carmel Valley Developer
- Known for: Developed the Carmel Valley Airport and Carmel Valley Village
- Awards: Purple Heart

Military service
- Allegiance: United States of America
- Branch/service: United States Army; United States Air Force
- Years of service: 1917–1919; 1942–1943
- Rank: Captain (armed forces) (1917) (Note: Ford was Captain during World War I and became Lieutenant colonel durinig World War II.); Lieutenant colonel (US) (1942)
- Commands: 26th Infantry Division (United States)
- Battles/wars: World War I; Meuse-Argonne Campaign; World War II

Lewis Byington Ford (November 1, 1890 – January 19, 1985) was a Monterey Peninsula real estate developer who developed Pebble Beach and Carmel Woods. Ford established the Carmel Valley Airport, the first airpark of its kind in the United States, and developed a nearby business district. He created the Carmel Realty Company, was a cartoonist, poloist, baseball player, coach in the Carmel Abalone League, and acted in and directed over 45 plays. Ford was involved in the social circle and society of Monterey Peninsula.

== Early life ==
Byington Ford was born on November 1, 1890, in Downieville, Sierra County, California to Tirey L. Ford and Mary Emma Byington. His father is a direct descended of French Huguenots. His family moved to San Francisco in 1895, and they were still there at the time of the 1906 San Francisco earthquake and fire.

Ford graduated from Santa Clara College in 1910 with a Bachelor of Arts degree. He went on to get his master's from the University of California at Berkeley, graduating in 1913, where he earned his Master of Arts degree. The thesis for his master's degree was A History of the County Court of England from 1066-1307. Ford studied law at St. Ignatius Jesuit College, now the University of San Francisco, but gave up the idea and instead went into real estate.

On November 17, 1920, Ford married Marion Boisot in Pebble Beach, California.

On February 22, 1937, Ford married his second wife, Ruth Austin Mattimore, in Reno, Nevada.

== Career ==
In 1916, Ford was director of the Animated Film Corporation in San Francisco, of which his father, Tirey L. Ford, was president. The endeavor ended with the entry of the U.S. into World War I.

=== Military ===
In 1917, Ford enlisted in the California National Guard and went to Officers Training Camp at the Presidio of San Francisco where he was commissioned and then sent to France during World War I. In France, he trained at the Saint-Cyr cavalry school. He was captain in the 102nd Field Artillery Regiment of the 26th "Yankee" Division. He fought at the Battle of Saint-Mihiel, the Second Battle of the Marne, the engagement of June 16 at Xivray-et-Marvoisin, the Meuse–Argonne offensive, among other engagements. On March 10, 1919, Ford returned home after recuperating from a poison gas attack suffered in an advance on Troyon, France, during the Meuse–Argonne offensive. He brought a detachment of soldiers from France back to New York. He was awarded the Purple Heart for injuries suffered in action.

In 1941, Ford enlisted in the U.S. Army air force during World War II and became a lieutenant colonel.

=== Post-war ===
While living in Carmel, Ford became involved in local politics. On August 25, 1934, speakers of the Carmel citizens' committee accused the John Reed Clubs of being a communistic organization. Ford, chairman of the committee, read reports from the national committees and showed charts seized in recently raided communist headquarters. Ford headed the citizens' committee to oppose the JRC and their activities.

In 1919, working with Samuel Finley Brown Morse, Ford became manager at the Del Monte Properties in Pebble Beach, California, heading their real estate department for twelve years. He rode horseback through the undeveloped parts of Del Monte Forest to survey the land for development. In 1931 he formed the Carmel Realty Company. During August 1934, Byington Ford was a member of the executive committee of Carmel's American Legion Post No. 512, actively involved as the post sought its provisional charter. On July 9, 1935, he was elected post commander.

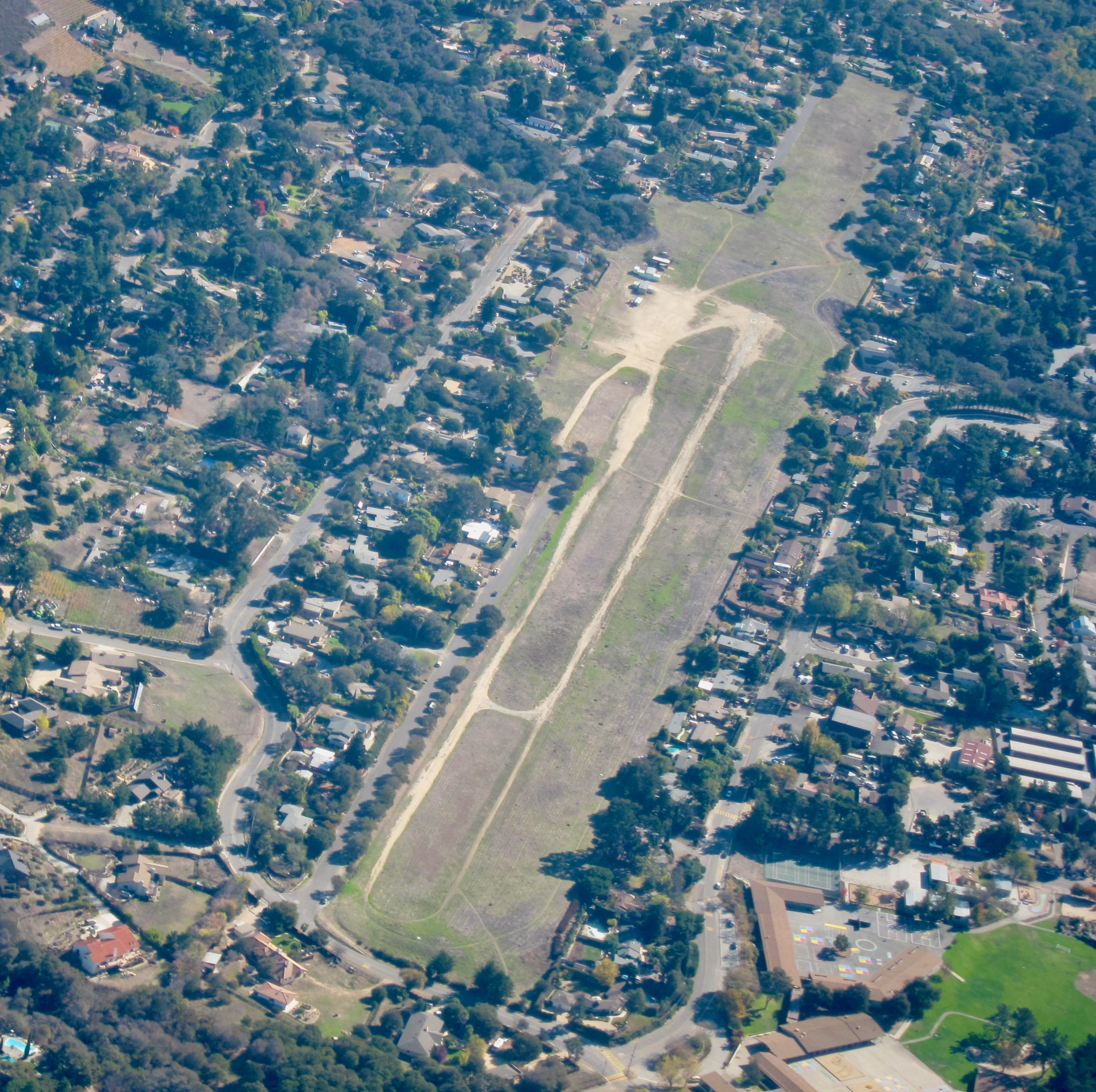
Carmel Valley Airport

Ford developed the first airpark in Carmel Valley. According to the Carmel Valley Historic Airport Society, "Convinced that mass production of small aircraft would put a plane within the reach of anyone who could afford a car, in the late 1930s Byington bought the northeast corner of Rancho Los Laureles for an airpark." He and his brother Tirey Ford developed the Carmel Valley Airport for pilot-owners. A nearby road was named after him called Ford Road. Ford constructed the first two "hangar homes" when he opened the air park to the public on December 7, 1941. In 1954, Ford retired, and Peter Delfino purchased the Carmel Valley Airport property for $35,000.

In 1946, Byington and his brother developed the Carmel Valley Village and Airway Market, first known as the General Store, which included a barber shop, drug store, soda fountain, beauty shop and liquor store; all were in walking distance of the Airpark. Artist Bruce Ariss painted murals on each store to resemble a Spanish village.

In 1955, he wrote a sketch book called A Cartoon Sketch Book for Beginners.

== Death ==
On January 19, 1985, Ford died of pancreatic cancer at his home in Ventura, California.
