= National Register of Historic Places listings in Sierra County, California =

Location of Sierra County in California

This is a list of the National Register of Historic Places listings in Sierra County, California.

This is intended to be a complete list of the properties and districts on the National Register of Historic Places in Sierra County, California, United States. Latitude and longitude coordinates are provided for many National Register properties and districts; these locations may be seen together in an online map.

There are 15 properties and districts listed on the National Register in the county.

This National Park Service list is complete through NPS recent listings posted September 4, 2026.

== Current listings ==
	Name on the Register	Image	Date listed	Location	City or town	Description
1	1872 California-Nevada State Boundary Marker	1872 California-Nevada State Boundary Marker	August 27, 1981 (#81000387)	Northwest of Verdi on the California/Nevada border 39°31′28″N 120°00′07″W	near Verdi, Nevada	
2	Durgan Bridge	Durgan Bridge	July 10, 2012 (#12000398)	Nevada St. 39°33′35″N 120°49′46″W	Downieville	
3	Foote's Crossing Road		January 29, 1981 (#81000180)	Tahoe National Forest; 39°25′42″N 120°54′58″W	Nevada City	
4	Forest City	Forest City	September 3, 1996 (#96000942)	Off of Mountain House Rd., at the junction of North and South Forks, Tahoe National Forest; 39°29′25″N 120°51′05″W	Forest City	
5	Hansen Bridge	Hansen Bridge	July 10, 2012 (#12000399)	E. River St. between Upper Main and Pearl Sts. 39°33′47″N 120°49′31″W	Downieville	
6	Hawley Lake Petroglyphs		May 6, 1971 (#71000200)	Address Restricted	Gold Lake	
7	Hospital Bridge	Hospital Bridge	July 10, 2012 (#12000400)	Upper Main St. over the Downie River; 39°34′11″N 120°49′21″W	Downieville	
8	Jersey Bridge	Jersey Bridge	July 10, 2012 (#12000401)	California Route 49 from Main to Commercial Sts. 39°33′36″N 120°49′40″W	Downieville	
9	Kyburz Flat Site	Kyburz Flat Site	November 12, 1971 (#71000201)	Address Restricted	Loyalton	
10	Sardine Valley Archeological District		May 6, 1971 (#71000202)	Address Restricted	Truckee	
11	Sierra City School	Sierra City School	January 9, 2024 (#100009718)	418 Main Street (California Route 49); 39°34′02″N 120°37′49″W	Sierra City	
12	Sierra County Sheriff's Gallows	Sierra County Sheriff's Gallows	February 15, 1990 (#90000118)	Galloway Rd. and Courthouse Sq. 39°33′30″N 120°49′46″W	Downieville	
13	Sierraville School	Sierraville School	September 28, 2017 (#100001666)	305 S. Lincoln St. 39°35′04″N 120°22′07″W	Sierraville	
14	Stampede Site		October 14, 1971 (#71000203)	Address Restricted	near Verdi, Nevada	
15	Webber Lake Hotel		December 31, 2018 (#100003281)	Off Jackson Meadow Rd./Tahoe National Forest Rd, 7; 39°29′25″N 120°24′46″W	Sierraville vicinity	

== See also ==
- List of National Historic Landmarks in California
- National Register of Historic Places listings in California
- California Historical Landmarks in Sierra County, California
