= Pliocene Ridge =

Coordinates: 39.46°N 120.90°W

The Pliocene Ridge is a region of Sierra County, California, corresponding to the southwestern portion of the county, including the settlements of Alleghany, Forest and Pike.

The Pliocene Ridge Community Services District governs fire stations in Pike and Alleghany. Pliocene Ridge Jr/Sr High School in Pike operated from 1974 to 2006.
