= California Historical Landmarks in Sierra County =

This list includes properties and districts on the California Historical Landmarks listings for Sierra County, in eastern California.

Click the "Map of all coordinates" link to the right to view a Google map of all properties and districts with latitude and longitude coordinates in the table below.

Image		Landmark name	Location	City or town	Summary
Henness Pass Road	421	Henness Pass Road	Ridge and Henness Pass Rds. 38°12′44″N 119°00′44″W	Alleghany	Toll road cross the Sierra Mountains
Plum Valley House	695	Plum Valley House	Ridge Rd. 39°26′54″N 120°57′39″W	Alleghany	Toll Station on Henness Pass Road
Sierra County Sheriff's Gallows	971	Sierra County Sheriff's Gallows	39°33′32″N 120°49′48″W	Downieville	Also a NRHP No. 90000118

== See also ==
- National Register of Historic Places listings in Sierra County, California
- List of California Historical Landmarks
