= Plum Valley House =

Historical place in Sierra County, United States

- Plum Valley House was toll station to cross the Sierra mountains

- Location within California Location within the United States
- 39.44826°N 120.9608°W
- Location: Ridge Road, Alleghany, California

History
- Built: 1854
- Built for: Henness Pass Turnpike Company

Site notes
- Architect: John Bope
- Architectural style: Log cabin

California Historical Landmark
- Designated: September 11, 1959
- Reference no.: 695

Plum Valley House was built in 1854 by John Bope by hand. The Plum Valley House is a California Historical Landmark No. 695 listed on September 11, 1959. Bope built the Plum Valley House from hand hewn logs and whipsawn cut lumber. Bope house was named for the many wild plums which grow on the land near the house. The Plum Valley House was a toll station for travelers heading west on the Henness Pass Road between Marysville and Virginia City. Many for the travelers came west looking for gold in the California Gold Rush. The toll road was owned by the Henness Pass Turnpike Company, originally called the Truckee Turnpike Company founded in 1859. The Henness Pass toll closed after the completion of the First transcontinental railroad in 1868.

A historical marker is at the site of the former Plum Valley House is on Ridge Road, 8.6 miles East of California State Route 49 and 9.0 miles West of Alleghany. The marker was placed there by California State Park Commission and Native Daughters of the Golden West, Sierra Parlor No. 268 in 1962.

== See also ==
- California Historical Landmarks in Sierra County
