= Sierra Brooks, California =

Sierra Brooks
- census-designated place
- Position in California.
- Coordinates: 39°38′33″N 120°12′55″W
- Country: United States
- State: California
- County: Sierra

Area
  - Total: 1.370 sq mi (3.549 km^{2})
  - Land: 1.370 sq mi (3.549 km^{2})
  - Water: 0 sq mi (0 km^{2}) 0%
- Elevation: 5,180 ft (1,580 m)

Population (2020)
  - Total: 467
  - Density: 341/sq mi (132/km^{2})
- Time zone: UTC-8 (Pacific (PST))
  - Summer (DST): UTC-7 (PDT)
- GNIS feature ID: 2583138

Sierra Brooks is a census-designated place (CDP) in Sierra County, California, United States. Sierra Brooks sits at an elevation of 5,180 feet (1,580 m). The 2020 United States census reported Sierra Brooks's population was 467.

== Geography ==
According to the United States Census Bureau, the CDP covers an area of 1.4 square miles (3.5 km^{2}), all land.

== Demographics ==
Historical population
Census	Pop.	Note	%±
2010	478		—
2020	467		−2.3%
U.S. Decennial Census; 2010

Sierra Brooks first appeared as a census designated place in the 2010 U.S. census.

Sierra Brooks CDP, California – Racial and ethnic composition Note: the US Census treats Hispanic/Latino as an ethnic category. This table excludes Latinos from the racial categories and assigns them to a separate category. Hispanics/Latinos may be of any race.
Race / Ethnicity (NH = Non-Hispanic)	Pop 2010	Pop 2020	% 2010	% 2020
White alone (NH)	446	354	93.31%	75.80%
Black or African American alone (NH)	0	2	0.00%	0.43%
Native American or Alaska Native alone (NH)	4	4	0.84%	0.86%
Asian alone (NH)	1	3	0.21%	0.64%
Native Hawaiian or Pacific Islander alone (NH)	1	0	0.21%	0.00%
Other race alone (NH)	0	1	0.00%	0.21%
Mixed race or Multiracial (NH)	4	38	0.84%	8.14%
Hispanic or Latino (any race)	22	65	4.60%	13.92%
Total	478	467	100.00%	100.00%

=== 2020 census ===
The 2020 United States census reported that Sierra Brooks had a population of 467. The population density was 340.9 inhabitants per square mile (131.6/km^{2}). The racial makeup of Sierra Brooks was 370 (79.2%) White, 2 (0.4%) African American, 7 (1.5%) Native American, 3 (0.6%) Asian, 0 (0.0%) Pacific Islander, 5 (1.1%) from other races, and 80 (17.1%) from two or more races. Hispanic or Latino of any race were 65 persons (13.9%).

The whole population lived in households. There were 184 households, out of which 64 (34.8%) had children under the age of 18 living in them, 114 (62.0%) were married-couple households, 9 (4.9%) were cohabiting couple households, 35 (19.0%) had a female householder with no partner present, and 26 (14.1%) had a male householder with no partner present. 32 households (17.4%) were one person, and 16 (8.7%) were one person aged 65 or older. The average household size was 2.54. There were 147 families (79.9% of all households).

The age distribution was 116 people (24.8%) under the age of 18, 10 people (2.1%) aged 18 to 24, 102 people (21.8%) aged 25 to 44, 133 people (28.5%) aged 45 to 64, and 106 people (22.7%) who were 65 years of age or older. The median age was 46.8 years. For every 100 females, there were 99.6 males.

There were 206 housing units at an average density of 150.4 units per square mile (58.1 units/km^{2}), of which 184 (89.3%) were occupied. Of these, 176 (95.7%) were owner-occupied, and 8 (4.3%) were occupied by renters.

== Politics ==
In the state legislature, Sierra Brooks is in the 1st senatorial district, represented by Republican Megan Dahle, and the 1st Assembly district, represented by Republican Heather Hadwick.

Federally, Sierra Brooks is in California's 3rd congressional district, represented by Independent Kevin Kiley.
