= Webber Lake Hotel =

Historic building in the U.S. state of California

- U.S. National Register of Historic Places
- Location within Northern California Location within California
- Location: Jackson Meadow Rd. and Tahoe NF Road 7, Sierraville, California
- Coordinates: 39.4904°N 120.4128°W
- Built: 1860
- NRHP reference No.: 100003281
- Added to NRHP: December 31, 2018

The Webber Lake Hotel, located near Jackson Meadow Road and Tahoe NF Road 7 outside Sierraville, California, was added to the National Register of Historic Places on December 31, 2018.

== History ==
Dr. David Gould Webber opened the Webber Lake Hotel in 1860, shortly after Henness Pass Road was opened along the lowest pass through the Sierra Nevada mountains, connecting Camptonville, California (near Marysville) and Verdi, Nevada (near Virginia City). After freight and stagecoach traffic on the road dwindled with the completion of the First transcontinental railroad in 1868, Webber began advertising the hotel as a health retreat. As a tourist destination, guests included nurse Clara Barton, actor Lola Montez, and painter Thomas Hill.
