= Goodyears Bar, California =

Goodyears Bar
- census-designated place
- Location of Goodyears Bar in Sierra County, California.

- Location within California Location within the United States
- Coordinates: 39°32′24″N 120°53′04″W
- Country: United States
- State: California
- County: Sierra

Area
  - Total: 2.066 sq mi (5.352 km^{2})
  - Land: 2.050 sq mi (5.309 km^{2})
  - Water: 0.017 sq mi (0.043 km^{2}) 0.81%
- Elevation: 2,674 ft (815 m)

Population (2020)
  - Total: 69
  - Density: 34/sq mi (13/km^{2})
- Time zone: UTC-8 (Pacific (PST))
  - Summer (DST): UTC-7 (PDT)
- ZIP code: 95944
- Area code: 530
- GNIS feature IDs: 1658637; 2583027

Goodyears Bar, known as Slaughter's Bar before 1851, is a census-designated place (CDP) in Sierra County, California, United States. As of the 2020 census, Goodyears Bar had a population of 69. Goodyears Bar is located along the North Yuba River and California State Route 49 3.25 miles (5.23 km) west-southwest of Downieville. Goodyears Bar has a post office with ZIP code 95944. The post office opened in 1851.

== History ==
Goodyears Bar is a historic gold mining camp. Gold was discovered here by the brothers Miles and Andrew Goodyear, along with a Dr. Vaughan and a Mr. Morrison in 1849. It was given the name Goodyears Bar in honor of its founders. The Goodyear boys built a cabin there. Miners prospected gold on the Goodyears Creek. A post office was established on October 7, 1851, with Mr. Woodruff as the first Postmaster. The first school was begun in 1856 with Mrs. Massey as the first teacher.

Folk singer Kate Wolf is buried in Goodyears Bar.

== Geography ==
According to the United States Census Bureau, the CDP covers an area of 2.1 square miles (5.4 km^{2}), of which 99.19% is land and 0.81% is water.

=== Climate ===
This region experiences warm (but not hot) and dry summers, with no average monthly temperatures above 71.6 °F. According to the Köppen Climate Classification system, Goodyears Bar has a warm-summer Mediterranean climate, abbreviated "Csb" on climate maps.

== Demographics ==
Historical population
Census	Pop.	Note	%±
2010	68		—
2020	69		1.5%
U.S. Decennial Census; 2010

Goodyears Bar first appeared as a census designated place in the 2010 U.S. census.

Goodyears Bar CDP, California – Racial and ethnic composition Note: the US Census treats Hispanic/Latino as an ethnic category. This table excludes Latinos from the racial categories and assigns them to a separate category. Hispanics/Latinos may be of any race.
Race / Ethnicity (NH = Non-Hispanic)	Pop 2010	Pop 2020	% 2010	% 2020
White alone (NH)	63	59	92.65%	85.51%
Black or African American alone (NH)	0	0	0.00%	0.00%
Native American or Alaska Native alone (NH)	4	2	5.88%	2.90%
Asian alone (NH)	0	0	0.00%	0.00%
Native Hawaiian or Pacific Islander alone (NH)	0	0	0.00%	0.00%
Other race alone (NH)	0	0	0.00%	0.00%
Mixed race or Multiracial (NH)	0	1	0.00%	1.45%
Hispanic or Latino (any race)	1	7	1.47%	10.14%
Total	68	69	100.00%	100.00%

=== 2020 census ===
The 2020 United States census reported that Goodyears Bar had a population of 69. The population density was 33.7 inhabitants per square mile (13.0/km^{2}). The racial makeup of Goodyears Bar was 63 (91%) White, 0 (0%) African American, 2 (3%) Native American, 0 (0%) Asian, 0 (0%) Pacific Islander, 1 (1%) from other races, and 3 (4%) from two or more races. Hispanic or Latino of any race were 7 persons (10%).

The whole population lived in households. There were 31 households, of which 16 were families and 12 were one person living alone. The median age was 52.4 years. There were 47 males and 22 females.

There were 42 housing units at an average density of 20.5 units per square mile (7.9 units/km^{2}), of which 31 were occupied, 4 by homeowners and 27 by renters.

== Politics ==
In the state legislature, Goodyears Bar is in the 1st senatorial district, represented by Republican Megan Dahle, and the 1st Assembly district, represented by Republican Heather Hadwick.

Federally, Goodyears Bar is in California's 3rd congressional district, represented by Independent Kevin Kiley.
