= Verdi, California =

Verdi
- census-designated place
- Position in California. Verdi (the United States)
- Coordinates: 39°30′34″N 120°02′52″W
- Country: United States
- State: California
- County: Sierra

Area
  - Total: 4.187 sq mi (10.843 km^{2})
  - Land: 4.173 sq mi (10.808 km^{2})
  - Water: 0.014 sq mi (0.035 km^{2}) 0.32%
- Elevation: 5,315 ft (1,620 m)

Population (2020)
  - Total: 179
  - Density: 42.9/sq mi (16.6/km^{2})
- Time zone: UTC-8 (Pacific (PST))
  - Summer (DST): UTC-7 (PDT)
- GNIS feature ID: 2583175

Verdi is a census-designated place (CDP) in Sierra County, California, United States. Verdi sits at an elevation of 5,315 feet (1,620 m). The 2020 United States census reported Verdi's population was 179. It is just across the state line from Verdi, Nevada and below the Verdi Range.

The town of Verdi was named after Giuseppe Verdi by Charles Crocker, founder of the Central Pacific Railroad, when he pulled a slip of paper from a hat and read the name of the Italian opera composer in 1868.

== Geography ==
According to the United States Census Bureau, the CDP covers an area of 4.2 square miles (11 km^{2}), of which 99.68% is land and 0.32% is water.

Climate data for Verdi, California
Month	Jan	Feb	Mar	Apr	May	Jun	Jul	Aug	Sep	Oct	Nov	Dec	Year
Mean daily maximum °F (°C)	43.8 (6.6)	47.5 (8.6)	53.8 (12.1)	60.2 (15.7)	69.5 (20.8)	79.3 (26.3)	90.6 (32.6)	90.2 (32.3)	80.2 (26.8)	68.2 (20.1)	54.0 (12.2)	44.2 (6.8)	65.1 (18.4)
Mean daily minimum °F (°C)	22.7 (−5.2)	24.3 (−4.3)	28.8 (−1.8)	32.2 (0.1)	39.5 (4.2)	47.3 (8.5)	54.0 (12.2)	53.3 (11.8)	46.3 (7.9)	35.6 (2.0)	28.4 (−2.0)	22.5 (−5.3)	36.2 (2.3)
Average precipitation inches (mm)	3.69 (94)	3.42 (87)	2.83 (72)	1.20 (30)	1.06 (27)	0.67 (17)	0.30 (7.6)	0.51 (13)	0.32 (8.1)	1.65 (42)	2.05 (52)	3.79 (96)	21.49 (545.7)
Average snowfall inches (cm)	19.2 (49)	15.4 (39)	14.0 (36)	3.1 (7.9)	0.1 (0.25)	0.0 (0.0)	0.0 (0.0)	0.0 (0.0)	0.0 (0.0)	1.2 (3.0)	4.4 (11)	16.3 (41)	73.7 (187.15)
Source: Prism,

== Demographics ==
Historical population
Census	Pop.	Note	%±
2010	162		—
2020	179		10.5%
U.S. Decennial Census; 1860–1870 1880-1890; 1900 1910 1920; 1930 1940 1950; 1960 1970 1980; 1990 2000 2010; 2020

Verdi first appeared as a census designated place in the 2010 U.S. census.

=== Racial and ethnic composition ===
Verdi CDP, California – Racial and ethnic composition Note: the US Census treats Hispanic/Latino as an ethnic category. This table excludes Latinos from the racial categories and assigns them to a separate category. Hispanics/Latinos may be of any race.
Race / Ethnicity (NH = Non-Hispanic)	Pop 2010	Pop 2020	% 2010	% 2020
White alone (NH)	149	163	91.98%	91.06%
Black or African American alone (NH)	0	0	0.00%	0.00%
Native American or Alaska Native alone (NH)	0	0	0.00%	0.00%
Asian alone (NH)	1	0	0.62%	0.00%
Native Hawaiian or Pacific Islander alone (NH)	0	0	0.00%	0.00%
Other race alone (NH)	0	1	0.00%	0.56%
Mixed race or Multiracial (NH)	2	7	1.23%	3.91%
Hispanic or Latino (any race)	10	8	6.17%	4.47%
Total	162	179	100.00%	100.00%

=== 2020 census ===
The 2020 United States census reported that Verdi had a population of 179. The population density was 42.9 inhabitants per square mile (16.6/km^{2}). The racial makeup of Verdi was 165 (92.2%) White, 0 (0.0%) African American, 0 (0.0%) Native American, 0 (0.0%) Asian, 0 (0.0%) Pacific Islander, 4 (2.2%) from other races, and 10 (5.6%) from two or more races. Hispanic or Latino of any race were 8 persons (4.5%).

The whole population lived in households. There were 77 households, out of which 11 (14.3%) had children under the age of 18 living in them, 42 (54.5%) were married-couple households, 2 (2.6%) were cohabiting couple households, 18 (23.4%) had a female householder with no partner present, and 15 (19.5%) had a male householder with no partner present. 25 households (32.5%) were one person, and 16 (20.8%) were one person aged 65 or older. The average household size was 2.32. There were 49 families (63.6% of all households).

The age distribution was 28 people (15.6%) under the age of 18, 2 people (1.1%) aged 18 to 24, 34 people (19.0%) aged 25 to 44, 62 people (34.6%) aged 45 to 64, and 53 people (29.6%) who were 65 years of age or older. The median age was 53.3 years. There were 94 males and 85 females.

There were 90 housing units at an average density of 21.6 units per square mile (8.3 units/km^{2}), of which 77 (85.6%) were occupied. Of these, 71 (92.2%) were owner-occupied, and 6 (7.8%) were occupied by renters.

== Government ==
In the state legislature, Verdi is in the 1st senatorial district, represented by Republican Megan Dahle, and the 1st Assembly district, represented by Republican Heather Hadwick.

Federally, Verdi is in California's 3rd congressional district, represented by Independent Kevin Kiley.

Fire protection for Verdi, CA is provided by the Sierra County Fire Protection District #1 utilizing primary response contracts with the Truckee Meadows Fire Protection District in Washoe County, Nevada and the Verdi Volunteer Fire Department.

Emergency Management Services (EMS) are also contractually provided by the Truckee Meadows Fire Protection District in Washoe County, Nevada.
