= Pike, California =

Pike
- census-designated place
- Location within California Location within the United States
- Coordinates: 39°26′21″N 120°59′53″W
- Country: United States
- State: California
- County: Sierra

Area
  - Total: 4.322 sq mi (11.195 km^{2})
  - Land: 4.322 sq mi (11.195 km^{2})
  - Water: 0 sq mi (0 km^{2}) 0%
- Elevation: 3,445 ft (1,050 m)

Population (2020)
  - Total: 159
- Time zone: UTC-8 (Pacific (PST))
  - Summer (DST): UTC-7 (PDT)
- Area code: 530
- GNIS feature IDs: 1658637; 2583112

Pike, formerly Pike City is a census-designated place in Sierra County, California, United States. Pike is 8.5 miles (13.7 km) west-southwest of Alleghany. The community was named after Pike County, Missouri. The post office in Pike opened as Pike City Post Office in 1877, became Pike Post Office in 1895, and closed in 1954. The population was 159 at the 2020 census.

Pike is the home of playwright and director Zach Helm.

== Geography ==
According to the United States Census Bureau, the CDP covers an area of 4.3 square miles (11.2 km^{2}), all land. west side of the sierra . Like grass valley like Nevada City in the type of pines and climate .

== Demographics ==
Historical population
Census	Pop.	Note	%±
2010	134		—
2020	159		18.7%
U.S. Decennial Census; 2010

Pike first appeared as a census designated place in the 2010 U.S. census.

Pike CDP, California – Racial and ethnic composition Note: the US Census treats Hispanic/Latino as an ethnic category. This table excludes Latinos from the racial categories and assigns them to a separate category. Hispanics/Latinos may be of any race.
Race / Ethnicity (NH = Non-Hispanic)	Pop 2010	Pop 2020	% 2010	% 2020
White alone (NH)	129	130	96.27%	81.76%
Black or African American alone (NH)	0	1	0.00%	0.63%
Native American or Alaska Native alone (NH)	1	0	0.75%	0.00%
Asian alone (NH)	2	0	1.49%	0.00%
Native Hawaiian or Pacific Islander alone (NH)	0	0	0.00%	0.00%
Other race alone (NH)	0	2	0.00%	1.26%
Mixed race or Multiracial (NH)	0	15	0.00%	9.43%
Hispanic or Latino (any race)	2	11	1.49%	6.92%
Total	134	159	100.00%	100.00%

The 2020 United States census reported that Pike had a population of 159. The population density was 36.8 inhabitants per square mile (14.2/km^{2}). The racial makeup of Pike was 130 (81.8%) White, 1 (0.6%) African American, 0 (0.0%) Native American, 0 (0.0%) Asian, 0 (0.0%) Pacific Islander, 2 (1.3%) from other races, and 26 (16.4%) from two or more races. Hispanic or Latino of any race were 11 persons (6.9%).

The whole population lived in households. There were 75 households, out of which 14 (18.7%) had children under the age of 18 living in them, 36 (48.0%) were married-couple households, 3 (4.0%) were cohabiting couple households, 1 (1.3%) had a female householder with no partner present, and 35 (46.7%) had a male householder with no partner present. 32 households (42.7%) were one person, and 15 (20.0%) were one person aged 65 or older. The average household size was 2.12. There were 42 families (56.0% of all households).

The age distribution was 20 people (12.6%) under the age of 18, 2 people (1.3%) aged 18 to 24, 33 people (20.8%) aged 25 to 44, 40 people (25.2%) aged 45 to 64, and 64 people (40.3%) who were 65 years of age or older. The median age was 56.9 years. There were 87 males and 72 females.

There were 87 housing units at an average density of 20.1 units per square mile (7.8 units/km^{2}), of which 75 (86.2%) were occupied. Of these, 57 (76.0%) were owner-occupied, and 18 (24.0%) were occupied by renters.

== Politics ==
In the state legislature, Pike is in the 1st senatorial district, represented by Republican Megan Dahle, and the 1st Assembly district, represented by Republican Heather Hadwick.

Federally, Pike is in California's 3rd congressional district, represented by Independent Kevin Kiley.
