= Sierra County Sheriff's Gallows =

- U.S. National Register of Historic Places
- California Historical Landmark
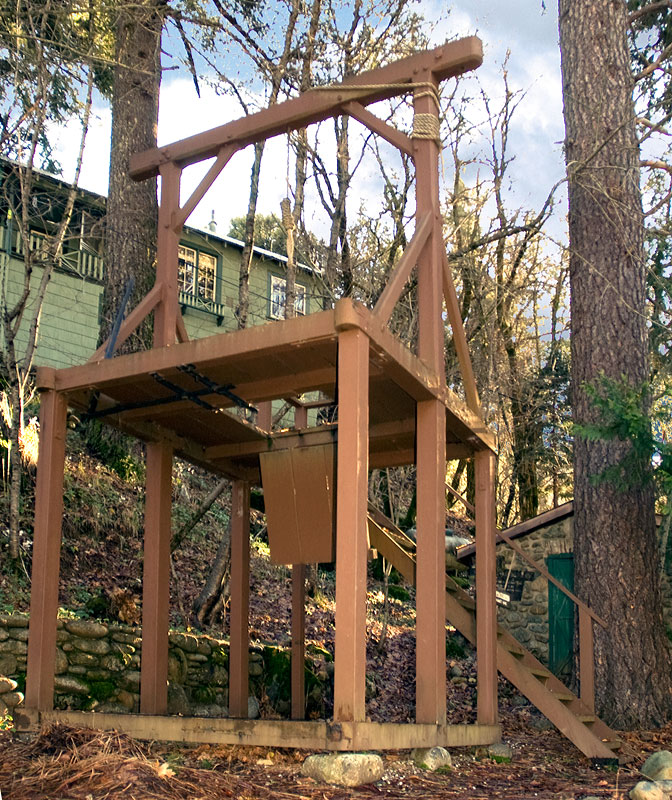

- Location within California
- Location: Galloway Rd. and Courthouse Sq., Downieville, California
- Coordinates: 39°33′30″N 120°49′46″W
- Area: less than one acre
- Built: 1885
- NRHP reference No.: 90000118
- CHISL No.: 971
- Added to NRHP: February 15, 1990

The Sierra County Sheriff's Gallows, at Galloway Rd. and Courthouse Sq. in Downieville, California in Sierra County, California, was built in 1885. It was listed on the National Register of Historic Places in 1990.

== Design ==
It is a structure 14.5 feet (4.4 m) tall, approximately 10.5 by 11.5 feet (3.2 m × 3.5 m) in plan. It was not designed to be permanent, but rather was designed to be dismantled, stored, and reassembled as needed. Its only use, however, was in 1885. Law changes in 1891 prevented its further usage.

It is built mainly of wood, with a metal trap door and mechanism. In 1988 the gallows was restored.

=== History ===
The gallows was erected for the hanging of James O'Neal, who was convicted for shooting and killing John Woodward at Webber Lake on August 7, 1884. O'Neal testified at the first trial in Sierra County Superior Court the two men had fought over O'Neal's pay after Woodward fired O'Neal, and the revolver was accidentally triggered by Woodward during the scuffle. Although other evidence pointed to the crime being deliberate, the first jury could not reach a verdict. After a second trial, the jury found O'Neal guilty of murder in the first degree and the court sentenced O'Neal to death, which was upheld by the Supreme Court of California. The hanging took place at 2 PM on November 27, 1885.

After the hanging, the gallows was disassembled and stored in the attic of the 1854 Sierra County Courthouse, where employees discovered it in 1927. Although it was "not conducive to happy thoughts", the gallows were reassembled and displayed next to the courthouse, surviving the 1947 fire that would destroy the courthouse.

== See also ==
- California Historical Landmarks in Sierra County
