= Sierraville School =

- U.S. National Register of Historic Places
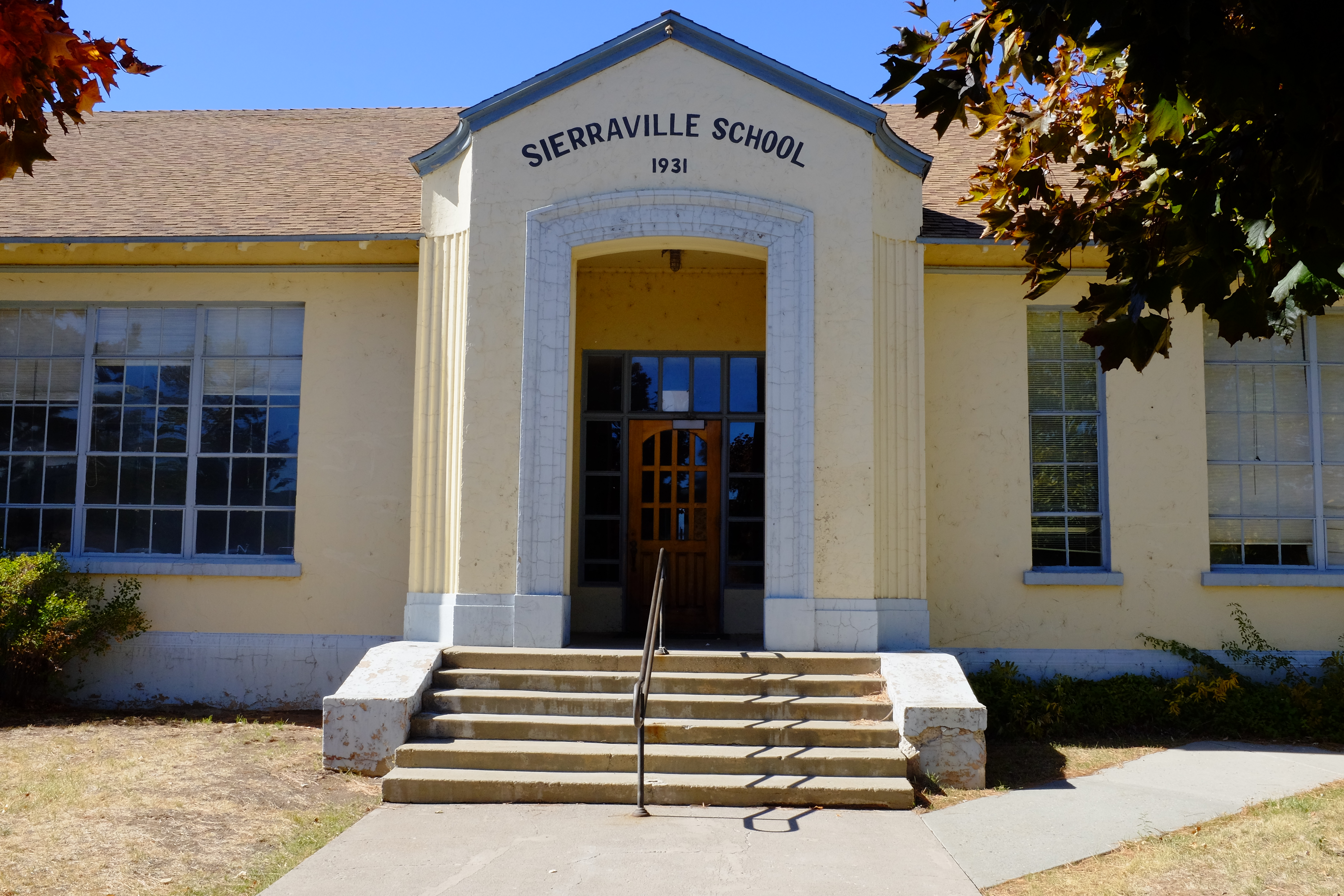

- Location within California Location within the United States
- Location: 305 S. Lincoln St., Sierraville, California
- Coordinates: 39°35′04″N 120°22′07″W
- Area: 1.87 acres (0.76 ha)
- NRHP reference No.: 100001666
- Added to NRHP: September 28, 2017

The Sierraville School, at 305 S. Lincoln St. (California State Route 89) in Sierraville, California, was listed on the National Register of Historic Places in 2017. The listing included two contributing buildings and two contributing objects.

The school is Art Deco in style and was built in 1931. It is rectangular, about 125 by 65 feet (38 m × 20 m) in plan, and 25 feet (7.6 m) tall to the top of its roof.

It has also been known as Sierraville-Randolph School and as Sierraville School Community Center

The other contributing resources are "a metal flagpole located in the front schoolyard, a four-way drinking fountain located on the rear, northwest side, and a multipurpose wood-framed garage".
