= National Socialist Kindred =

Neo-Nazi and racial paganism organization

The National Socialist Kindred was a group that sought to combine Esoteric Nazism and Odinism with a plan to create a White separatist "Folk Community" in Northern California called Volksberg.

The group was founded by Joseph Turner (1946-1996), also known as Jost. Turner was a Vietnam War veteran who was disillusioned when he returned to California in the late 1960s. While contemptuous of much of the 1960s counterculture, racial integration, drug use and civil disobedience he found, Turner also sympathized with the hippies' rejection of selfishness and materialism, which he believed was characteristic of the White majority of the time, and liked their idea of "destroying the system by non-participation". Taking inspiration from the back-to-the-land and communalist movements of the decade, Turner and his family left the "urban social and economic system"—which Jost felt was characterized by the growing power of non-whites and "indifference and growing materialism of whites -- and began homesteading in the isolated mountains of Northern California. There were a number of other communalists in the area whose ideology Jost describes as a mix of "left-wing politics, oriental religion, Robin Hood and brotherhood" that was "permeated with anti-establishment idealism". Turner appreciated the amount of research and effort that the communalists had put into their projects of simple living and self-sufficiency, and praised their development of organic farming, animal husbandry, herbal medicine weaving, spinning, leather craft and success in living outside the mainstream economy. He and his family spent several years learning these skills from their neighbors and living in "crude octagon cabins, barns and even tepees."

However, this peaceful coexistence did not last. Jost attributes the decline to the other communalists' lack of discipline and embrace of "Jewish permissiveness", as well as their failure to pass their ideas down to their children. The cultivation of marijuana led to conflicts among the communalists and with law enforcement and the idealism and live and let live atmosphere that Jost saw in the experiment shattered. Jost then decided to form the National Socialist Kindred, with the aim of bringing together like minded racialists into a new self-seficient community, to be called Volksberg. To that end he formed the National Socialist Kindred.

For the next fifteen years or so, the NSK distributed pamphlets and exhorted like minded people to pull up stakes and join the community at Volksberg. However, Jost grew impatient with the quality of people who came to live in the commune. In a letter to Tommy Ryden in Sweden he stated that there were few people who were willing to forsake jobs, home, family, and friends to move to the Folk-community. More often than not, they were willing to pull up stakes because they did not have any of those things and wished for somebody to take care of them. He continued "Most were psychopaths and dangerous." Jost disbanded the NSK in 1995, feeling that it was counter-productive to keep an organization apparatus. Moreover, Josts ideas had evolved, and he was concentrating on developing a system of yoga called Arya Kriya that concentrated on developing a more personal relationship than was possible in an organizational setting. He still distributed literature and correspondence under the imprimatur Jost, however, Jost died of a heart attack in 1996.

== Publications ==
- Jost The Essentials of Mein Kampf Volksberg, California; NS Kindred 1988
- Jost The Path of Wotan: our spiritual heritage NSJ. California; NS Kindred 1994
- Jost National Socialism; Adolf Hitlers Revelations of the Eternal Laws of Nature for Family and Folk Nevada City, California; National Socialist Kindred

== Sources ==
- Kaplan, Jeffrey (2000). Encyclopedia of white power : a sourcebook on the radical racist right. Walnut Creek, CA: AltaMira Press. ISBN 9780742503403. OCLC 42889808.
