= Forest, California =

Unincorporated community in California, United States

- Unincorporated community
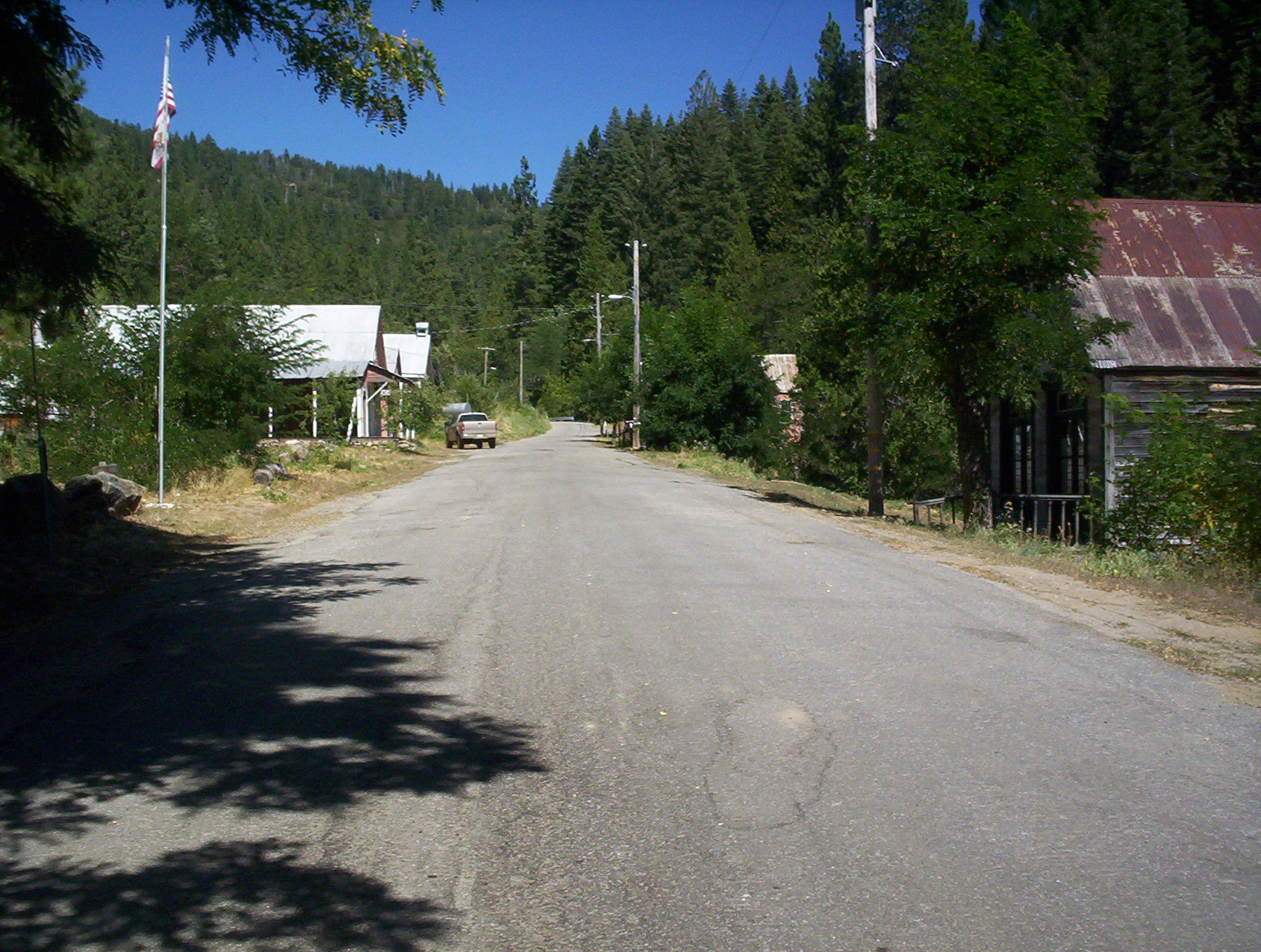
- Main Street in Forest

- Location in California Location in the United States
- Coordinates: 39°29′29″N 120°51′11″W
- Country: United States
- State: California
- County: Sierra
- Elevation: 4,489 ft (1,368 m)
- Time zone: UTC-8 (Pacific (PST))
  - Summer (DST): UTC-7 (PDT)
- GNIS feature ID: 1658559

Forest, also known as Forest City, is a small unincorporated community town site in Sierra County, California, United States, in the Sierra Nevada.

The town site of Forest is located at 4,489 feet (1,368 m) in elevation.

== History ==
Gold was discovered here in 1852. The name of Brownsville was adopted as the name of the camp, after one of the sailors who had found the gold. By the next year, the population of Forest had swelled to over a thousand during the California Gold Rush. A vote was held in 1854 and the town's name was changed to "Forest City". The Bald Mountain drift mine was founded in August 1864, and was the largest of its kind in the state at the time. Large fires in 1865 and 1883 devastated the town, after which little was rebuilt.

Today, Forest is primarily a historic ghost town, though there are a few year-round residents. Old buildings still line its Main Street, including a former general store, saloon and dance hall. A one–room schoolhouse, two cemeteries, and a few scattered residences can be found in the hills around the town.

The National Socialist Kindred had its beginnings in Forest before moving to a nearby property on Alleghany Ridge Road between Camptonville and North San Juan. The town was also home to several associates of the National Alliance up until the late 1990s.

== Notable residents ==
- Rich Brooks, former Oregon Ducks Football and Kentucky Wildcats football head coach
- Jeanette Lawrence, writer and lecturer; born and raised in Forest
- Stephen McNallen, white nationalist activist and founder of the Asatru Folk Assembly; former resident

== See also ==
- Downieville, California
- History of Sierra County, California
- List of ghost towns in California
