= Sierra County, California =

County in California, United States

Coordinates: 39.59°N 120.50°W

Sierra County
- County
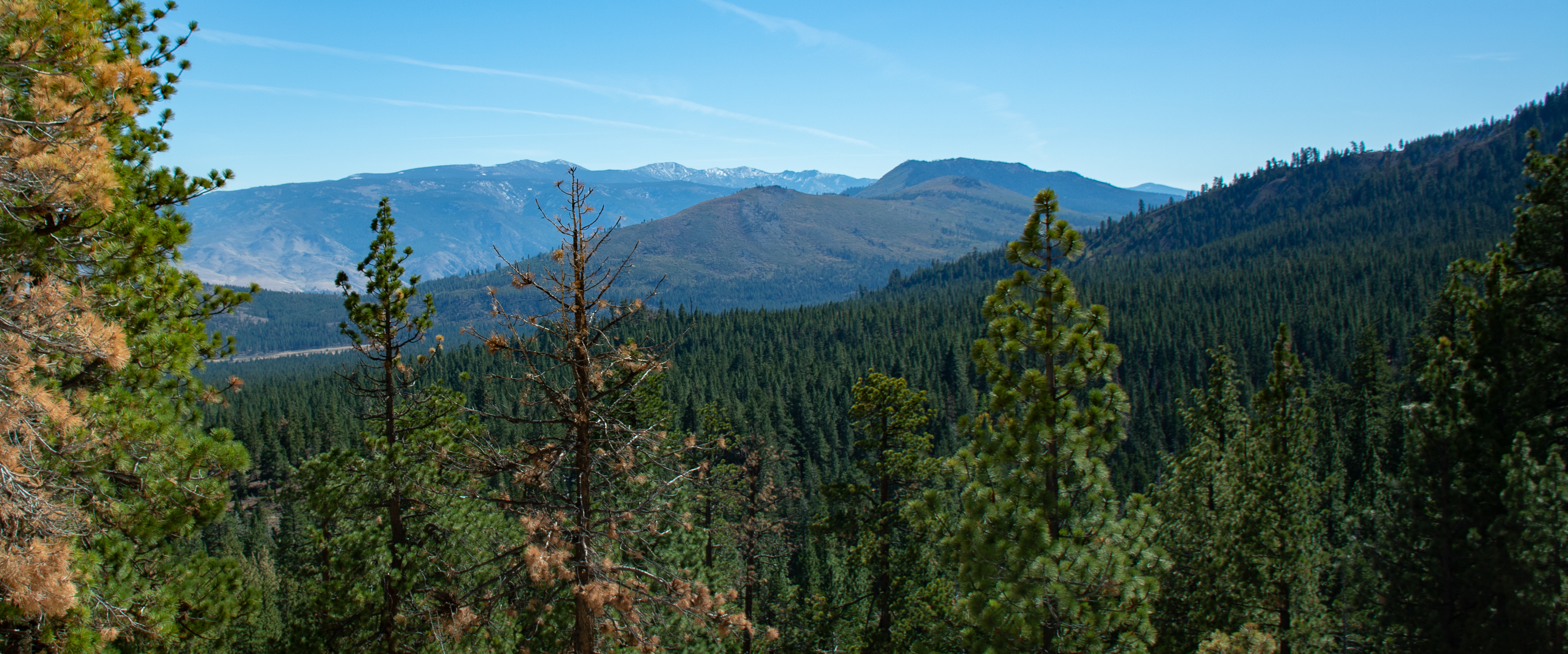
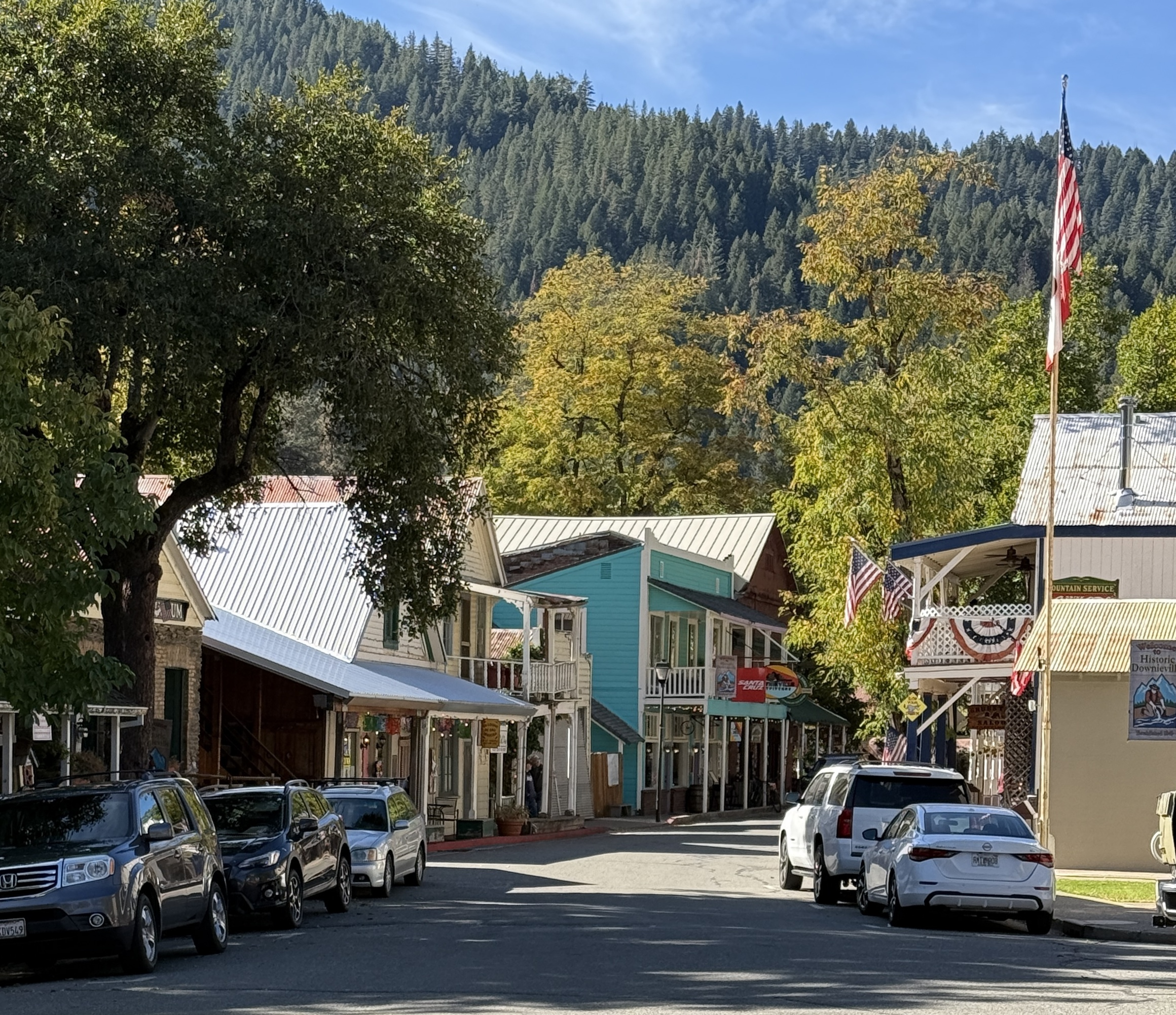
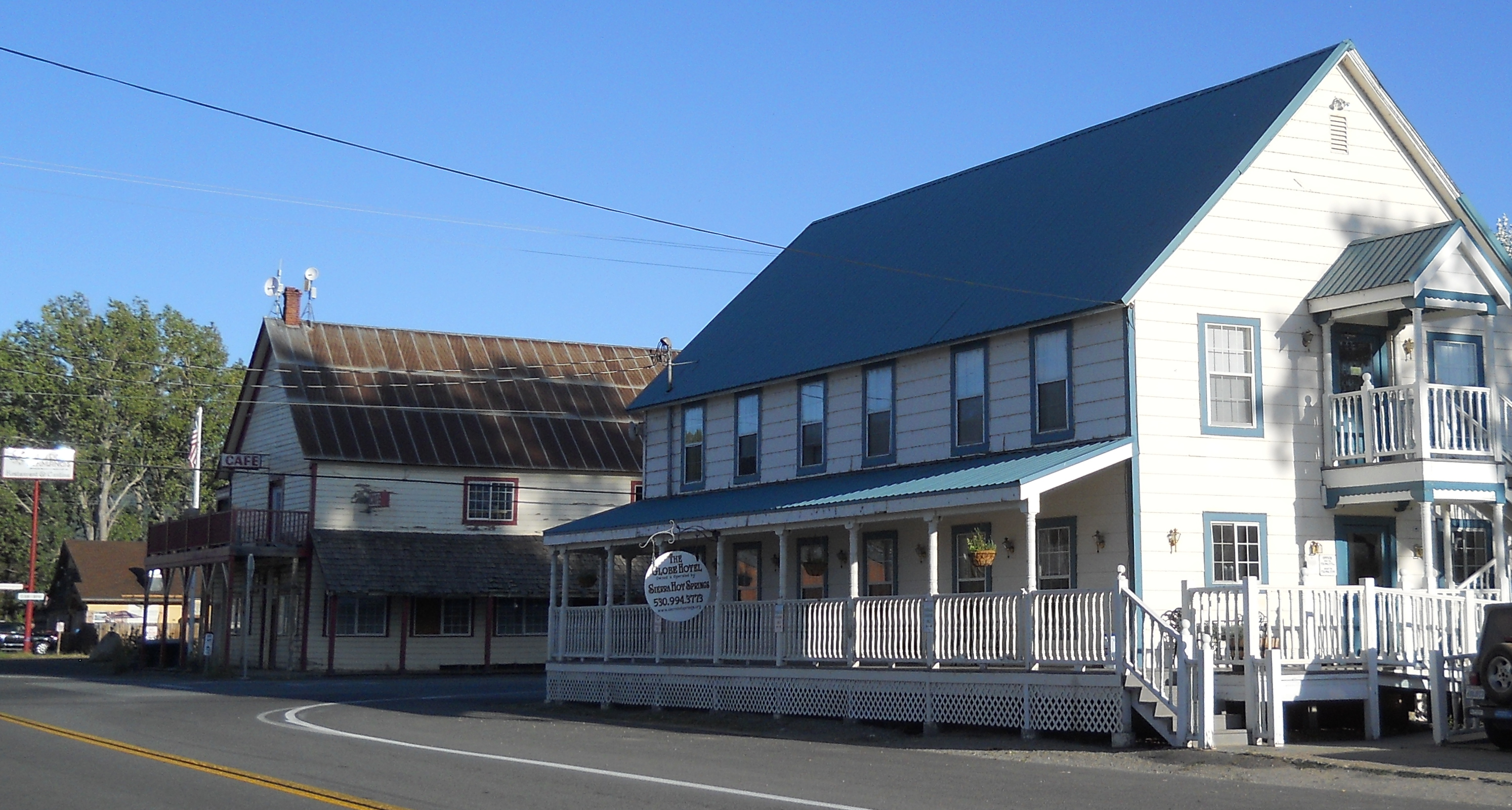
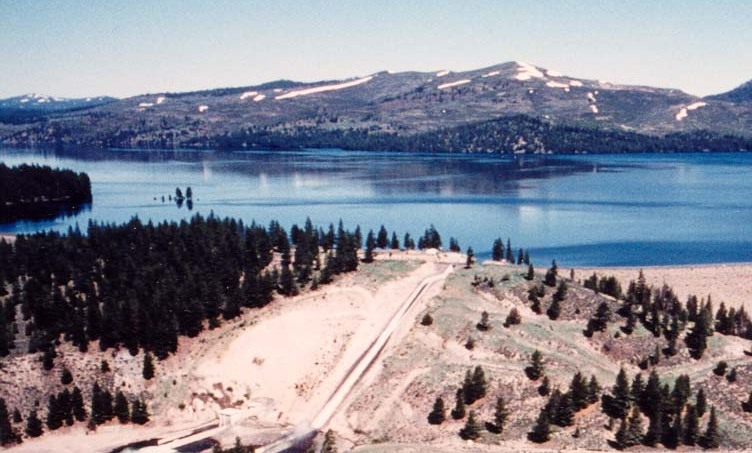
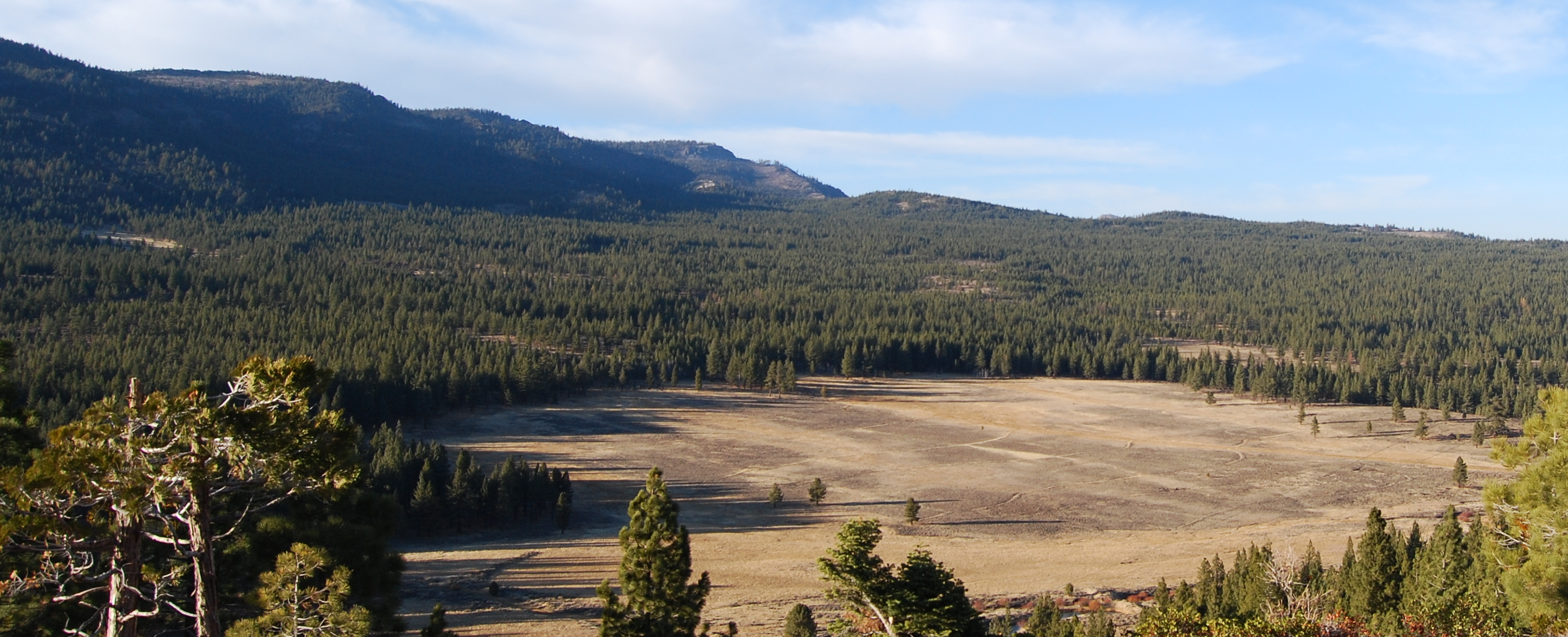
- Tahoe National Forest Downieville Sierraville Stampede Reservoir Sierra City Toiyabe National Forest

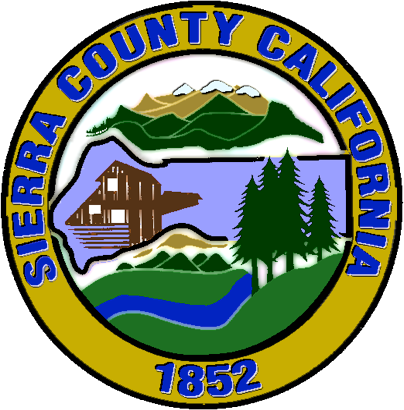
- Seal
- Interactive map of Sierra County
- Location in the state of California
- Country: United States
- State: California
- Region: Sierra Nevada
- Incorporated: April 16, 1852
- Named for: Sierra Nevada
- County seat: Downieville
- Largest city: Loyalton

Government
  - Type: Council–Manager
  - Chair: Paul Roen
  - Vice Chair: Sharon Dryden
  - Board of Supervisors: Supervisors: Lee Adams; Lila Heuer; Paul Roen; Terry LeBlanc; Sharon Dryden

Area
  - Total: 962 sq mi (2,490 km^{2})
  - Land: 953 sq mi (2,470 km^{2})
  - Water: 9 sq mi (23 km^{2})
- Highest elevation: 8,844 ft (2,696 m)

Population (April 1, 2020)
  - Total: 3,236
  - Estimate (2025): 3,098 ▼
  - Density: 3.40/sq mi (1.31/km^{2})

GDP
  - Total: $0.114 billion (2022)
- Time zone: UTC-8 (Pacific Standard Time)
  - Summer (DST): UTC-7 (Pacific Daylight Time)
- Area code: 530
- Congressional district: 3rd
- Website: www.sierracounty.ca.gov

Sierra County (/siˈɛrə/) is a county located in the U.S. state of California. As of the 2020 census, the population was 3,236, making it California's second-least populous county. The county seat is Downieville; the sole incorporated city is Loyalton. The county is in the Sierra Nevada, northeast of Sacramento on the border with Nevada.

== History ==
Sierra County was formed from parts of Yuba County in 1852. The county derives its name from the Sierra Nevada mountain range.

Prior to the California Gold Rush, the area was home to both the Maidu and the Washoe peoples. They generally summered in the higher elevations to hunt and fish, and returned to lower elevations for the winter months. After the discovery of gold in the Sierra foothills sparked the California Gold Rush, more than 16,000 miners settled in Sierra County between 1848 and 1860. Most mining settlements in the county sprung up along the North and Middle Forks of the Yuba River, both of which had rich deposits of gold. While some of the mining boom towns faded away once gold fever died down, other settlements such as Downieville and Sierra City have remained.

Notable gold nuggets found in the county include a 26.5 pound specimen, avoirdupois, found by a group of sailors at Sailor Ravine, two miles above Downieville. A 51-pound specimen was found in 1853 by a group of Frenchmen in French Ravine. The 106 pound Monumental Nugget was found in August 1869 at Sierra City.

The Bald Mountain drift mine in Forest City was founded in Aug. 1864, and was the largest of its kind in the state at the time. The Bald Mountain Extension was located in 1874 east of Forest. The Monte Cristo Mine was located in 1854. The largest quartz mine is the Sierra Buttes Gold Mine, located in 1850 near Sierra City. The Gold Bluff Mine was located near Downieville in 1854. By 1880 the county was crushing 70,000 tons of quartz and had 266 miles of mining ditches.

=== Boundary dispute with Nevada County ===
Since the enactment of the statute in which the California State Legislature defined the common boundary between Nevada and Sierra Counties in 1874, no survey was conducted to determine where the straight line segment of the common boundary between the two counties ran. In particular, the statute, at the time codified as Section 3921 of the California Political Code, at the time stated:

...thence south on said state line (state of Nevada) to the northeast corner of Nevada County, a point east of the source of the South Fork of the Middle Yuba River; thence west to the source of, and down the South Fork of the Middle Yuba River to a point ten miles above the mouth of the latter.

Since the line was not surveyed and the legislature never defined where the "point east of the source of the South Fork of the Middle Yuba River" was, the location of the straight air line between the state line and this point was unknown. As such, both counties claimed that the point east of the source, which itself was also unknown, was located in different places. This created a situation where a strip of land averaging 1.22 miles in width and around 31.29 square miles were under dispute, with Sierra County claiming that Nevada County was encroaching on their jurisdiction when attempting to levy property taxes. The trial court, that of Plumas County, sided with Sierra County, declaring that the disputed area had always belonged to Sierra County since the legislature defined the boundary in dispute by referencing Public Land Survey System lines. It also determined that the source of South Fork of the Middle Yuba River was that of several springs in the Sierra Nevada, contrary to the artificial English Lake, which ceased to exist after the failure of its dam in 1883, which is where the source of said waterway was in the eyes of Nevada County. The California Supreme Court affirmed the trial courts decision on December 28, 1908.

== Geography ==
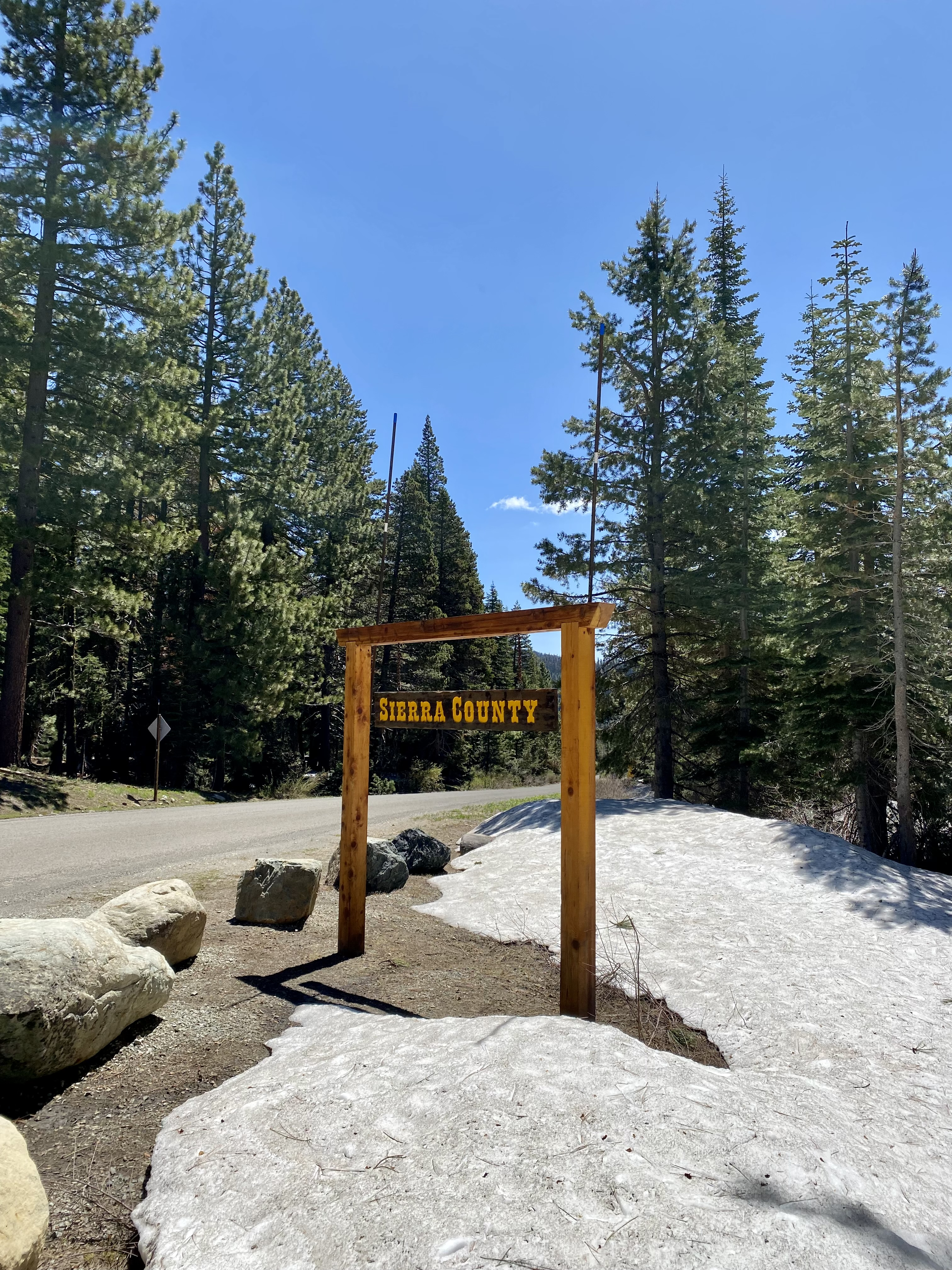
Sierra County, California, near Plumas National Forest

Sierra County, California covers 962 square miles according to the U.S. Census Bureau. The county comprises 953 square miles of land and 9 square miles of water. The county is located in the Sierra Nevada. The county has a diverse range of landscapes, from mountains to forests, with numerous lakes and streams. The area offers hiking, fishing, and hunting.

=== Adjacent counties ===
- Nevada County - south
- Yuba County - west
- Plumas County - north
- Lassen County - northeast
- Washoe County, Nevada - east

=== National protected areas ===
- Plumas National Forest (part)
- Tahoe National Forest (part)
- Toiyabe National Forest (part)

== Government ==
Because Loyalton is Sierra County's most populous community and its only incorporated city, generally half of the meetings of the county's board of supervisors are held in Downieville and the other half are held in Loyalton. The county is governed by the five-member Sierra County Board of Supervisors, consisting of the following members as of August 2021.

- District One (Downieville, Goodyears' Bar, Pike, Alleghany): Lee Adams, chairman
- District Two (Sierra City, Bassetts, Verdi): Peter W. Huebner
- District Three (Calpine, Sattley, Sierraville): Paul Roen
- District Four (Loyalton): Terry LeBlanc
- District Five (Sierra Brooks): Sharon Dryden

Law enforcement is provided by the Sierra County Sheriff's Department, headed by current Sierra County Sheriff-Coroner Michael "Mike" Fisher. Due to the county's sparse population and geographical obstacles, the Sheriff's Department operates a substation in Loyalton in addition to their main headquarters in Downieville.

== Politics ==
=== Voter registration statistics ===
Population and registered voters
Total population	3,277	
Registered voters (Note: Percentage of registered voters with respect to total population. Percentages of party members with respect to registered voters follow.)	2,223	67.8%
Democratic	631	28.4%
Republican	939	42.2%
Democratic–Republican spread	-308	-13.8%
American Independent	126	5.7%
Green	24	1.1%
Libertarian	30	1.3%
Peace and Freedom	4	0.2%
Americans Elect	0	0.0%
Other	42	1.9%
No party preference	427	19.2%

==== Cities by population and voter registration ====
Cities by population and voter registration
City	Population	Registered voters	Democratic	Republican	D–R spread	Other	No party preference
Loyalton	890	49.1%	32.3%	38.7%	-6.4%	14.6%	19.9%

=== Overview ===
Sierra County at one time had favored the Democratic party in presidential elections and was one of few counties in California to be won by George McGovern. In more recent times it is a strongly Republican county in presidential and congressional elections. The last Democrat to win a majority in the county was Jimmy Carter in 1976.

United States presidential election results for Sierra County, California (Note: The leading "other" candidate, national Progressive and statewide Republican nominee Theodore Roosevelt, received 483 votes, whilst Socialist Party candidate Eugene V. Debs received 133 votes, Prohibition Party candidate Eugene W. Chafin received 13 votes, and various write-in candidates received 14 votes.)
Year	Republican		Democratic		Third party(ies)	
Year	No.	%	No.	%	No.	%
1892	787	57.45%	529	38.61%	54	3.94%
1896	707	56.61%	527	42.19%	15	1.20%
1900	702	60.99%	436	37.88%	13	1.13%
1904	791	65.05%	376	30.92%	49	4.03%
1908	600	55.40%	410	37.86%	73	6.74%
1912	10	0.86%	515	44.47%	633	54.66%
1916	360	35.36%	594	58.35%	64	6.29%
1920	506	72.18%	158	22.54%	37	5.28%
1924	276	38.93%	73	10.30%	360	50.78%
1928	457	51.52%	420	47.35%	10	1.13%
1932	292	25.46%	796	69.40%	59	5.14%
1936	340	22.56%	1,152	76.44%	15	1.00%
1940	511	32.38%	1,057	66.98%	10	0.63%
1944	443	39.91%	662	59.64%	5	0.45%
1948	546	43.40%	660	52.46%	52	4.13%
1952	822	53.76%	698	45.65%	9	0.59%
1956	638	50.55%	620	49.13%	4	0.32%
1960	576	46.79%	647	52.56%	8	0.65%
1964	413	33.28%	828	66.72%	0	0.00%
1968	548	45.93%	559	46.86%	86	7.21%
1972	629	47.51%	658	49.70%	37	2.79%
1976	680	43.15%	841	53.36%	55	3.49%
1980	855	49.77%	651	37.89%	212	12.34%
1984	1,078	56.86%	781	41.19%	37	1.95%
1988	860	50.71%	791	46.64%	45	2.65%
1992	691	36.85%	653	34.83%	531	28.32%
1996	877	51.38%	573	33.57%	257	15.06%
2000	1,172	63.45%	540	29.24%	135	7.31%
2004	1,249	64.12%	646	33.16%	53	2.72%
2008	1,158	58.16%	743	37.32%	90	4.52%
2012	1,056	58.83%	653	36.38%	86	4.79%
2016	1,048	57.27%	601	32.84%	181	9.89%
2020	1,142	59.14%	730	37.80%	59	3.06%
2024	1,066	60.74%	641	36.52%	48	2.74%

On November 4, 2008, Sierra County voted 64.2% for Proposition 8, which amended the California Constitution to ban same-sex marriages.

In the 2009 special statewide election, Sierra County had the highest voter turnout of any county in California and almost double the average statewide, with 53.6% of registered voters participating, according to the Los Angeles Times.

== Transportation ==
The only traffic light in the county is a flashing red light at the intersection of highways 49 and 89 in Sierraville. As of 2021, the sheriff's department has also erected a radar speed sign in Sierraville.

=== Major highways ===
- U.S. Route 395
- Interstate 80
- State Route 49
- State Route 89

=== Public transportation ===
Public transportation in Sierra County is limited to vans run by senior citizen agencies in Downieville and Loyalton, which the general public may ride on a space-available basis.

=== Airport ===
Sierraville-Dearwater Field Airport is a general aviation airport located near Sierraville. The closest major airport is in Reno.

== Crime ==
The following table includes the number of incidents reported and the rate per 1,000 persons for each type of offense.

Population and crime rates
Population	3,277	
Violent crime	13	3.97
Homicide	0	0.00
Forcible rape	0	0.00
Robbery	0	0.00
Aggravated assault	13	3.97
Property crime	33	10.07
Burglary	15	4.58
Larceny-theft (Note: Only larceny-theft cases involving property over $400 in value are reported as property crimes.)	28	8.54
Motor vehicle theft	0	0.00
Arson	1	0.31

== Demographics ==
Historical population
Census	Pop.	Note	%±
1860	11,387		—
1870	5,619		−50.7%
1880	6,623		17.9%
1890	5,051		−23.7%
1900	4,017		−20.5%
1910	4,098		2.0%
1920	1,783		−56.5%
1930	2,422		35.8%
1940	3,025		24.9%
1950	2,410		−20.3%
1960	2,247		−6.8%
1970	2,365		5.3%
1980	3,073		29.9%
1990	3,318		8.0%
2000	3,555		7.1%
2010	3,240		−8.9%
2020	3,236		−0.1%
2025 (est.)	3,098	▼	−4.3%
U.S. Decennial Census; 1790–1960 1900–1990; 1990-2000 2010 2020

=== 2020 census ===
As of the 2020 census, the county had a population of 3,236. The median age was 53.9 years; 16.6% of residents were under the age of 18 and 30.9% of residents were 65 years of age or older. For every 100 females there were 102.1 males, and for every 100 females age 18 and over there were 101.0 males age 18 and over.

The racial makeup of the county was 83.5% White, 0.2% Black or African American, 0.7% American Indian and Alaska Native, 0.2% Asian, 0.0% Native Hawaiian and Pacific Islander, 3.3% from some other race, and 12.0% from two or more races. Hispanic or Latino residents of any race comprised 11.7% of the population.

1.2% of residents lived in urban areas, while 98.8% lived in rural areas.

There were 1,456 households in the county, of which 23.8% had children under the age of 18 living with them and 24.9% had a female householder with no spouse or partner present. About 31.9% of all households were made up of individuals and 18.4% had someone living alone who was 65 years of age or older.

There were 2,127 housing units, of which 31.5% were vacant. Among occupied housing units, 74.0% were owner-occupied and 26.0% were renter-occupied. The homeowner vacancy rate was 2.4% and the rental vacancy rate was 7.1%.

=== Racial and ethnic composition ===
Sierra County, California – Racial and ethnic composition Note: the US Census treats Hispanic/Latino as an ethnic category. This table excludes Latinos from the racial categories and assigns them to a separate category. Hispanics/Latinos may be of any race.
Race / ethnicity (NH = Non-Hispanic)	Pop 1980	Pop 1990	Pop 2000	Pop 2010	Pop 2020	% 1980	% 1990	% 2000	% 2010	% 2020
White alone (NH)	2,821	3,060	3,210	2,855	2,615	91.80%	92.22%	90.30%	88.12%	80.81%
Black or African American alone (NH)	3	6	6	5	7	0.10%	0.18%	0.17%	0.15%	0.22%
Native American or Alaska Native alone (NH)	46	59	56	41	18	1.50%	1.78%	1.58%	1.27%	0.56%
Asian alone (NH)	7	8	5	12	7	0.23%	0.24%	0.14%	0.37%	0.22%
Native Hawaiian or Pacific Islander alone (NH)	x	x	3	2	1	x	x	0.08%	0.06%	0.03%
Other race alone (NH)	0	1	2	1	25	0.00%	0.03%	0.06%	0.03%	0.77%
Mixed-race or multiracial (NH)	x	x	60	55	186	x	x	1.69%	1.70%	5.75%
Hispanic or Latino (any race)	196	184	213	269	377	6.38%	5.55%	5.99%	8.30%	11.65%
Total	3,073	3,318	3,555	3,240	3,236	100.00%	100.00%	100.00%	100.00%	100.00%

=== American Community Survey 2025 data ===
The United States Census Bureau estimated that in 2025, Sierra County’s population was 3.098. It was also estimated that the county's population was 79,86% Non-Hispanic White, 12,49% Hispanic or Latino, 0,26% Non-Hispanic Black, 1,03% Asian, 1,00% Native American, 0,13% Pacific Islander, and 5,23% Multiracial.

Total	Population	Percentage
Non-Hispanic White	2.474	79,86%
Hispanic or Latino	387	12,49%
Non-Hispanic Black	8	0,26%
Asian	32	1,03%
Native American	31	1,00%
Pacific Islander	4	0,13%
Non-Hispanic Multiracial	162	5,23%

=== 2015 ===
As of 2015 the largest self-reported ancestry groups in Sierra County, California are:

Largest ancestries (2015)	Percent
English (England)	19.0%
German (Germany)	18.2%
"American" (United States)	16.1%
Scottish (Scotland)	6.4%
Italian (Italy)	5.9%
Polish (Poland)	4.6%
Portuguese (Portugal)	4.0%
Swiss (Switzerland)	3.6%
Swedish (Sweden)	3.2%
French (France)	3.1%

=== 2010 ===
The 2010 United States census reported that Sierra County had a population of 3,240. The racial makeup of Sierra County was 3,022 (93.3%) White, 6 (0.2%) African American, 44 (1.4%) Native American, 12 (0.4%) Asian, 2 (0.1%) Pacific Islander, 75 (2.3%) from other races, and 79 (2.4%) from two or more races. Hispanic or Latino of any race were 269 persons (8.3%).

Population reported at 2010 United States census
The county	Total population	White	African; American	Native; American	Asian	Pacific; Islander	other races	Two or more races	Hispanic or Latino (of any race)
Sierra County	3,240	3,022	6	44	12	2	75	79	269
Incorporated cities and towns	Total population	White	African; American	Native; American	Asian	Pacific; Islander	other races	Two or more races	Hispanic or Latino (of any race)
Loyalton	769	701	2	21	0	0	20	25	108
Census-designated places	Total population	White	African; American	Native; American	Asian	Pacific; Islander	other races	Two or more races	Hispanic or Latino (of any race)
Alleghany	58	58	0	0	0	0	0	0	1
Calpine	205	184	0	0	0	1	10	10	26
Downieville	282	269	0	4	2	0	0	7	12
Goodyears Bar	68	64	0	4	0	0	0	0	1
Pike	134	130	0	1	2	0	0	1	2
Sattley	49	48	0	1	0	0	0	0	1
Sierra Brooks	478	466	0	4	1	1	0	6	22
Sierra City	221	200	0	2	3	0	12	4	21
Sierraville	200	187	2	0	0	0	10	1	16
Verdi	162	153	0	0	1	0	5	3	10
Other unincorporated areas	Total population	White	African; American	Native; American	Asian	Pacific; Islander	other races	Two or more races	Hispanic or Latino (of any race)
All others not CDPs (combined)	614	562	2	7	3	0	18	22	49

=== 2000 ===
As of the census of 2000, there were 3,555 people, 1,520 households and 986 families residing in the county. The population density was 4 people per square mile (1.5 people/km^{2}). There were 2,202 housing units at an average density of 2 units per square mile (0.77 units/km^{2}). The racial makeup of the county was 94.2% White, 0.2% Black or African American, 1.9% Native American, 0.2% Asian, 0.1% Pacific Islander, 1.0% from other races, and 2.5% from two or more races. Six percent of the population were Hispanic or Latino of any race.

Eighteen percent were of English ancestry, 16% were of Irish, 11% German and 8% Italian ancestry. Over ninety-five (95.3) percent spoke English and 3.4% Spanish as their first language.

There were 1,520 households, out of which 27.6% had children under the age of 18 living with them, 53.1% were married couples living together, 7.9% had a female householder with no husband present, and 35.1% were non-families. 29.0% of all households were made up of individuals, and 11.5% had someone living alone who was 65 years of age or older. The average household size was 2.32 and the average family size was 2.83.

In the county, the population was spread out, with 23.3% under the age of 18, 4.8% from 18 to 24, 24.0% from 25 to 44, 30.2% from 45 to 64, and 17.7% who were 65 years of age or older. The median age was 44 years. For every 100 females there were 102.0 males. For every 100 females age 18 and over, there were 97.9 males.

The median income for a household in the county was $35,827, and the median income for a family was $42,756. Males had a median income of $36,121 versus $30,000 for females. The per capita income for the county was $18,815. About 9.0% of families and 11.3% of the population were below the poverty line, including 14.3% of those under age 18 and 2.2% of those age 65 or over.

== Media ==
Sierra County is served by two long-running local newspapers. The Sierra Valley region, which is partially within Sierra County, is served by the Sierra Booster, based in Loyalton. This paper has been published bi-weekly since 1949, when it was established by reporter, miner, and airman Hal Wright and his wife Allene. It is today run by their daughter Janice Wright Buck.

The other paper serving the county is the Mountain Messenger, which is based in Downieville. The Messenger has been in constant publication since 1853 and is currently the longest-running weekly newspaper in the state of California. Its more notable former contributor was Mark Twain, at the time in hiding from Nevadan authorities and writing under his birth name of Samuel Clemens. This paper was the center of considerable media attention in early 2020 when its future was uncertain with the retirement of Don Russell, who had owned and operated it for 30 years; it was saved by local retiree Carl Butz, who purchased the paper and runs it today. The Mountain Messenger is printed weekly on Thursdays; it is distributed across Sierra, eastern Plumas and western Nevada counties, and by mail.

== Education ==
The county is entirely in the Sierra-Plumas Joint Unified School District.

== Communities ==
=== City ===
- Loyalton

=== Census-designated places ===
- Alleghany
- Calpine
- Downieville (county seat)
- Goodyears Bar
- Pike
- Sattley
- Sierra Brooks
- Sierra City
- Sierraville
- Verdi

=== Unincorporated communities ===
- Forest
- Gibsonville
- Bassetts

=== Ghost towns ===
- Eureka City
- Howland Flat
- Pine Grove
- Poker Flat
- Potosi
- Shady Flat

=== Population ranking ===
The population ranking of the following table is based on the 2020 census of Sierra County.

† county seat

Rank	City/town/etc.	Municipal type	Population (2020 census)
1	Loyalton	City	740
2	Sierra Brooks	CDP	467
3	† Downieville	CDP	290
4	Sierraville	CDP	239
5	Sierra City	CDP	235
6	Calpine	CDP	223
7	Verdi	CDP	179
8	Pike	CDP	159
9	Goodyears Bar	CDP	69
10	Sattley	CDP	44
11	Alleghany	CDP	30

== See also ==
- National Register of Historic Places listings in Sierra County, California
- Schroeder Mountain
