= Sierraville, California =

Sierraville
- census-designated place
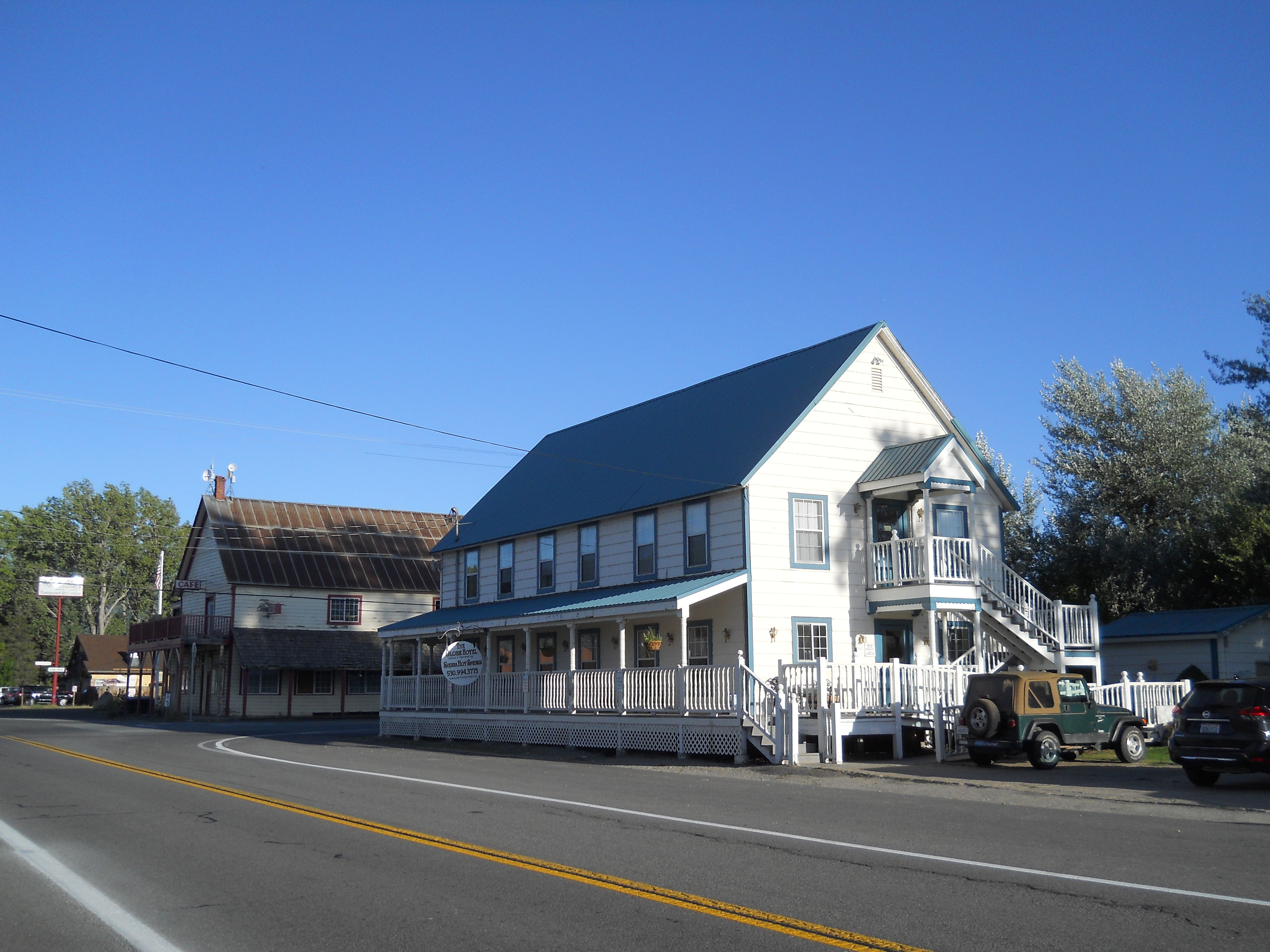
- Sierraville

- Location within California Location within the United States
- Coordinates: 39°35′23″N 120°22′03″W
- Country: United States
- State: California
- County: Sierra

Area
  - Total: 5.021 sq mi (13.004 km^{2})
  - Land: 5.020 sq mi (13.002 km^{2})
  - Water: 0.00077 sq mi (0.002 km^{2}) 0.02%
- Elevation: 4,957 ft (1,511 m)

Population (2020)
  - Total: 239
  - Density: 47.6/sq mi (18.4/km^{2})
- Time zone: UTC-8 (Pacific (PST))
  - Summer (DST): UTC-7 (PDT)
- ZIP code: 96126
- Area code: 530
- GNIS feature IDs: 1660231; 2583141

Sierraville (Sierra, Spanish for "mountain range" and Ville, French for "town") is a census-designated place in Sierra County, California, United States. It is at the southern end of the huge Sierra Valley which is used primarily as pasture and is also at the junction of California State Route 49 and California State Route 89 southwest of Loyalton. Sierraville has a post office with ZIP code 96126. The post office opened under the name Sierra Valley in 1862 and became known as the Sierraville post office in 1899. The population was 239 as of the 2020 census.

It is the site of the only traffic signal (a flashing red light) in Sierra County. In the winter of 2007, it was removed after an automobile accident and was replaced in the fall of 2008.

== Geography ==
According to the United States Census Bureau, the CDP covers an area of 5.0 square miles (13.0 km^{2}), of which 99.98% is land and 0.02% is water.

=== Climate ===
This region experiences warm (but not hot) and dry summers, with no average monthly temperatures above 71.6 °F. According to the Köppen Climate Classification system, Sierraville has a warm-summer Mediterranean climate, abbreviated "Csb" on climate maps.

Climate data for Sierraville, California, 1991–2020 normals, extremes 1909–present
Month	Jan	Feb	Mar	Apr	May	Jun	Jul	Aug	Sep	Oct	Nov	Dec	Year
Record high °F (°C)	69 (21)	71 (22)	78 (26)	84 (29)	94 (34)	101 (38)	104 (40)	104 (40)	100 (38)	92 (33)	79 (26)	70 (21)	104 (40)
Mean maximum °F (°C)	56.6 (13.7)	60.0 (15.6)	67.4 (19.7)	74.4 (23.6)	81.7 (27.6)	88.2 (31.2)	94.0 (34.4)	92.8 (33.8)	89.4 (31.9)	81.3 (27.4)	69.3 (20.7)	57.3 (14.1)	95.0 (35.0)
Mean daily maximum °F (°C)	44.0 (6.7)	47.4 (8.6)	53.5 (11.9)	59.1 (15.1)	67.5 (19.7)	76.7 (24.8)	85.2 (29.6)	84.8 (29.3)	79.1 (26.2)	67.7 (19.8)	54.7 (12.6)	43.8 (6.6)	63.2 (17.3)
Daily mean °F (°C)	31.0 (−0.6)	33.9 (1.1)	39.2 (4.0)	44.1 (6.7)	51.6 (10.9)	58.6 (14.8)	65.2 (18.4)	63.9 (17.7)	58.2 (14.6)	48.4 (9.1)	38.8 (3.8)	30.8 (−0.7)	47.0 (8.3)
Mean daily minimum °F (°C)	18.0 (−7.8)	20.3 (−6.5)	25.0 (−3.9)	29.1 (−1.6)	35.7 (2.1)	40.5 (4.7)	45.3 (7.4)	43.0 (6.1)	37.3 (2.9)	29.3 (−1.5)	23.0 (−5.0)	17.9 (−7.8)	30.4 (−0.9)
Mean minimum °F (°C)	2.0 (−16.7)	5.8 (−14.6)	12.3 (−10.9)	19.4 (−7.0)	25.7 (−3.5)	30.3 (−0.9)	36.3 (2.4)	33.4 (0.8)	27.2 (−2.7)	19.2 (−7.1)	10.2 (−12.1)	1.2 (−17.1)	−5.7 (−20.9)
Record low °F (°C)	−34 (−37)	−30 (−34)	−15 (−26)	0 (−18)	15 (−9)	20 (−7)	23 (−5)	25 (−4)	14 (−10)	7 (−14)	−13 (−25)	−29 (−34)	−34 (−37)
Average precipitation inches (mm)	3.59 (91)	3.84 (98)	3.41 (87)	1.51 (38)	0.94 (24)	0.45 (11)	0.31 (7.9)	0.27 (6.9)	0.39 (9.9)	1.33 (34)	2.23 (57)	4.05 (103)	22.32 (567.7)
Average snowfall inches (cm)	6.3 (16)	9.6 (24)	8.1 (21)	2.6 (6.6)	0.1 (0.25)	0.0 (0.0)	0.0 (0.0)	0.0 (0.0)	0.0 (0.0)	0.6 (1.5)	1.9 (4.8)	8.9 (23)	38.1 (97.15)
Average precipitation days (≥ 0.01 in)	5.1	5.6	6.4	5.2	4.0	1.9	0.9	1.1	1.6	2.8	3.7	5.5	43.8
Average snowy days (≥ 0.1 in)	1.7	2.0	1.4	1.1	0.0	0.0	0.0	0.0	0.0	0.4	0.6	1.9	9.1
Source: XMACIS2

== Demographics ==
Historical population
Census	Pop.	Note	%±
2010	200		—
2020	239		19.5%
U.S. Decennial Census; 1860–1870 1880-1890; 1900 1910 1920; 1930 1940 1950; 1960 1970 1980; 1990 2000 2010; 2020

Sierraville first appeared as a census designated place in the 2010 U.S. census.

=== Racial and ethnic composition ===
Sierraville CDP, California – Racial and ethnic composition Note: the US Census treats Hispanic/Latino as an ethnic category. This table excludes Latinos from the racial categories and assigns them to a separate category. Hispanics/Latinos may be of any race.
Race / Ethnicity (NH = Non-Hispanic)	Pop 2010	Pop 2020	% 2010	% 2020
White alone (NH)	182	198	91.00%	82.85%
Black or African American alone (NH)	2	0	1.00%	0.00%
Native American or Alaska Native alone (NH)	0	0	0.00%	0.00%
Asian alone (NH)	0	0	0.00%	0.00%
Native Hawaiian or Pacific Islander alone (NH)	0	0	0.00%	0.00%
Other race alone (NH)	0	2	0.00%	0.84%
Mixed race or Multiracial (NH)	0	9	0.00%	3.77%
Hispanic or Latino (any race)	16	30	8.00%	12.55%
Total	200	239	100.00%	100.00%

=== 2020 census ===
The 2020 United States census reported that Sierraville had a population of 239. The population density was 47.6 inhabitants per square mile (18.4/km^{2}). The racial makeup of Sierraville was 200 (83.7%) White, 0 (0.0%) African American, 0 (0.0%) Native American, 0 (0.0%) Asian, 0 (0.0%) Pacific Islander, 12 (5.0%) from other races, and 27 (11.3%) from two or more races. Hispanic or Latino of any race were 30 persons (12.6%).

The whole population lived in households. There were 94 households, out of which 25 (26.6%) had children under the age of 18 living in them, 30 (31.9%) were married-couple households, 12 (12.8%) were cohabiting couple households, 31 (33.0%) had a female householder with no partner present, and 21 (22.3%) had a male householder with no partner present. 36 households (38.3%) were one person, and 19 (20.2%) were one person aged 65 or older. The average household size was 2.54. There were 51 families (54.3% of all households).

The age distribution was 45 people (18.8%) under the age of 18, 7 people (2.9%) aged 18 to 24, 49 people (20.5%) aged 25 to 44, 72 people (30.1%) aged 45 to 64, and 66 people (27.6%) who were 65 years of age or older. The median age was 55.4 years. For every 100 females, there were 91.2 males.

There were 130 housing units at an average density of 25.9 units per square mile (10.0 units/km^{2}), of which 94 (72.3%) were occupied. Of these, 62 (66.0%) were owner-occupied, and 32 (34.0%) were occupied by renters.

== Politics ==
In the state legislature, Sierraville is included in the 1st senatorial district, represented by Republican Megan Dahle, and the 1st Assembly district, represented by Republican Heather Hadwick.

Federally, Sierraville is in California's 3rd congressional district, represented by Independent Kevin Kiley.
