= Alleghany, California =

Alleghany
- census-designated place
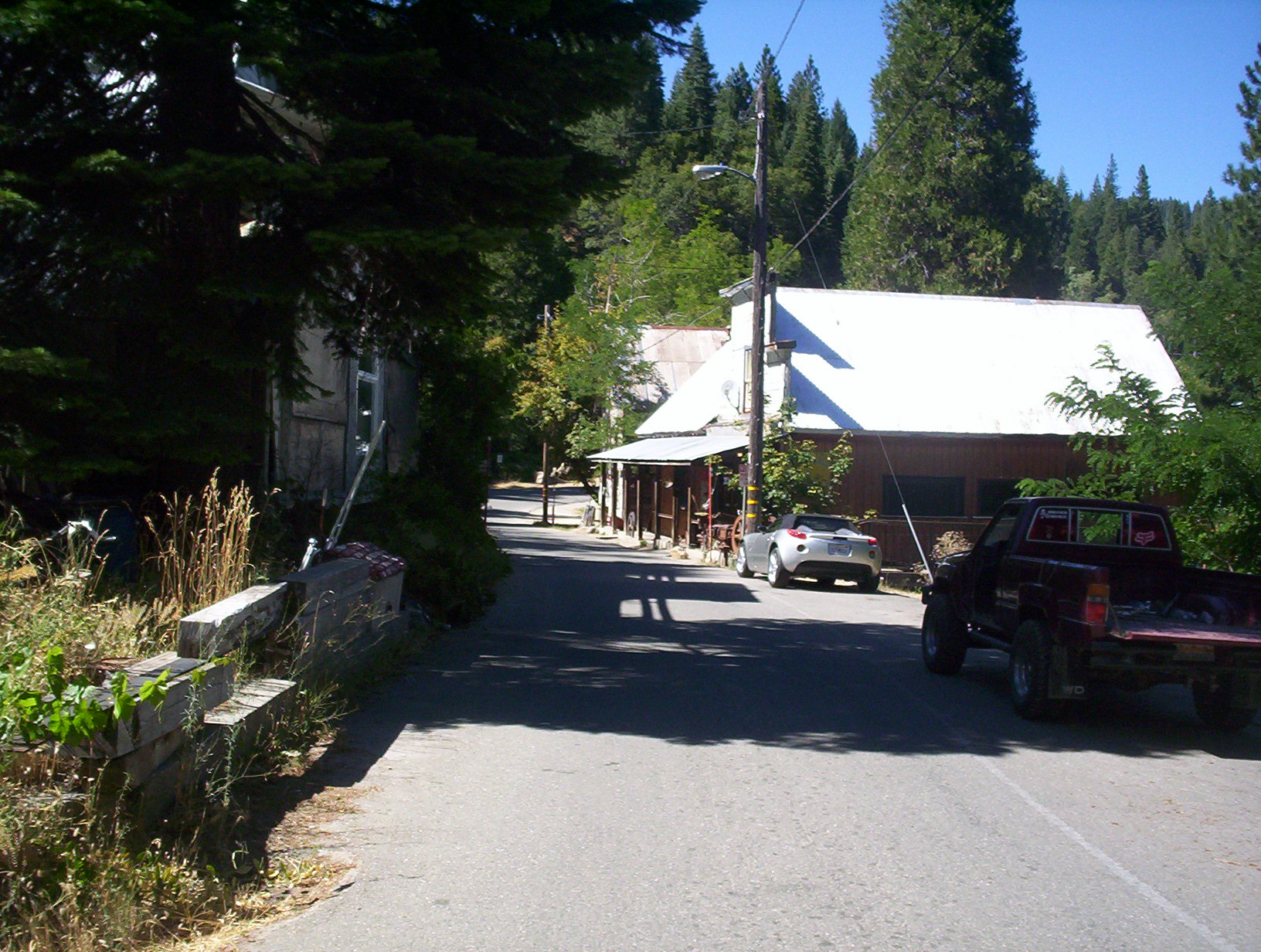
- Main Street in Alleghany

- Location within the state of California
- Coordinates: 39°28′00″N 120°50′28″W
- Country: United States
- State: California
- County: Sierra

Area
  - Total: 0.35 sq mi (0.90 km^{2})
  - Land: 0.35 sq mi (0.90 km^{2})
  - Water: 0 sq mi (0.00 km^{2}) 0%
- Elevation: 4,229 ft (1,289 m)

Population (2020)
  - Total: 30
  - Density: 85.9/sq mi (33.17/km^{2})
- Time zone: UTC-8 (Pacific (PST))
  - Summer (DST): UTC-7 (PDT)
- FIPS code: 06-00982
- GNIS feature ID: 2582931

Alleghany is a small census-designated place in Sierra County, California, United States in the Sierra Nevada. It is situated in the Gold Country and continues to be a significant locale for gold mining. The Sixteen To One Mine has been in operation since the days of the California Gold Rush. The town is 20 miles (32 km) from the nearest highway (California State Route 49) and consists largely of a single main street. The town is home to a post office, a bar, and a mining museum. The population was 30 at the 2020 census.

The community was named in 1859 for the Alleghany Tunnel mine that fueled the growth of the town when it struck gold four years earlier. The mine itself was named for the Allegheny River.

== Geography ==
According to the United States Census Bureau, the CDP covers an area of 0.3 square mile (0.9 km^{2}), all land.

== Demographics ==
Historical population
Census	Pop.	Note	%±
2010	58		—
2020	30		−48.3%
U.S. Decennial Census; 1860–1870 1880-1890; 1900 1910 1920; 1930 1940 1950; 1960 1970 1980; 1990 2000 2010

Alleghany first appeared as a census designated place in the 2010 U.S. census.

=== Racial and ethnic composition ===
Alleghany CDP, California – Racial and ethnic composition Note: the US Census treats Hispanic/Latino as an ethnic category. This table excludes Latinos from the racial categories and assigns them to a separate category. Hispanics/Latinos may be of any race.
Race / Ethnicity (NH = Non-Hispanic)	Pop 2010	Pop 2020	% 2010	% 2020
White alone (NH)	57	23	98.28%	76.67%
Black or African American alone (NH)	0	0	0.00%	0.00%
Native American or Alaska Native alone (NH)	0	0	0.00%	0.00%
Asian alone (NH)	0	0	0.00%	0.00%
Native Hawaiian or Pacific Islander alone (NH)	0	0	0.00%	0.00%
Other race alone (NH)	0	2	0.00%	6.67%
Mixed race or Multiracial (NH)	0	3	0.00%	10.00%
Hispanic or Latino (any race)	1	2	1.72%	6.67%
Total	58	30	100.00%	100.00%

=== 2020 census ===
As of the 2020 census, Alleghany had a population of 30. The population density was 86.0 inhabitants per square mile (33.2/km^{2}). The median age was 54.5 years. 10.0% of residents were under the age of 18, 70% were aged 18 to 64, and 20.0% of residents were 65 years of age or older. For every 100 females there were 172.7 males, and for every 100 females age 18 and over there were 200.0 males age 18 and over.

0.0% of residents lived in urban areas, while 100.0% lived in rural areas.

There were 16 households in Alleghany, of which 31.3% had children under the age of 18 living in them. The average household size was 1.88. There were 10 families (63% of all households). Of all households, 50.0% were married-couple households, 31.3% were households with a male householder and no spouse or partner present, and 6.3% were households with a female householder and no spouse or partner present. About 25.1% of all households were made up of individuals and 12.5% had someone living alone who was 65 years of age or older.

There were 25 housing units at an average density of 71.6 units per square mile (27.6 units/km^{2}), of which 36.0% were vacant. The homeowner vacancy rate was 0.0% and the rental vacancy rate was 0.0%. Of occupied housing units, 56% were owner-occupied and 44% were occupied by renters.

Racial composition as of the 2020 census
Race	Number	Percent
White	23	76.7%
Black or African American	0	0.0%
American Indian and Alaska Native	0	0.0%
Asian	0	0.0%
Native Hawaiian and Other Pacific Islander	0	0.0%
Some other race	2	6.7%
Two or more races	5	16.7%

== Politics ==
In the state legislature, Alleghany is in the 1st senatorial district, represented by Republican Megan Dahle, and the 1st Assembly district, represented by Republican Heather Hadwick.

Federally, Alleghany is in California's 3rd congressional district, represented by Independent Kevin Kiley.

== Notable people ==
- Robert D. Walsh, U.S. Army brigadier general
