= California Historical Landmarks in Kings County =

This list includes properties and districts listed on the California Historical Landmark listing in Kings County, California. Click the "Map of all coordinates" link to the right to view a Google map of all properties and districts with latitude and longitude coordinates in the table below.

Image		Landmark name	Location	City or town	Summary
El Adobe de los Robles Rancho	206	El Adobe de los Robles Rancho	10036 19 1/2 Ave. 36°19′40″N 119°48′32″W	Lemoore	
Kingston	270	Kingston	Kingston Park on Douglas Ave. 36°25′25″N 119°41′38″W	Laton	
Location of the famous Mussel Slough Tragedy	245	Location of the famous Mussel Slough Tragedy	5833 14th Ave. 36°23′21″N 119°42′31″W	Hardwick	

== See also ==
- List of California Historical Landmarks
- National Register of Historic Places listings in Kings County, California
