= Lemoore, California =

City in California, United States

- City
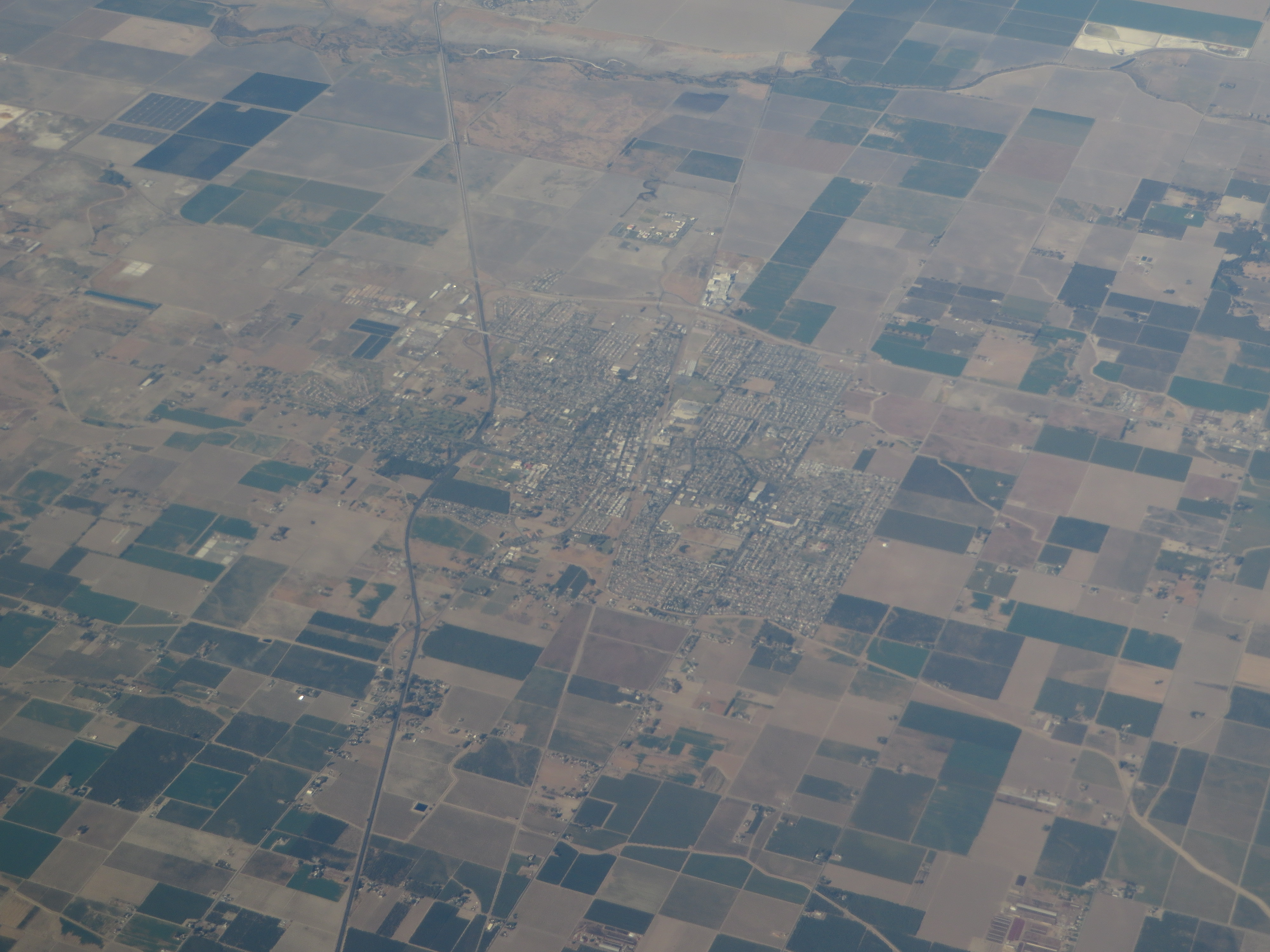
- Overlooking Lemoore
- Interactive map of Lemoore, California
- Location within California Location within the United States
- Coordinates: 36°18′03″N 119°46′58″W
- Country: United States
- State: California
- County: Kings
- Incorporated: July 4, 1900

Government
  - Type: Council-Manager
  - City Council: Patricia Matthews (Mayor); Dr. Frank Gornick (Mayor Pro Tem); Jonathan Cruz; Stuart Lyons; Jonathan Brewster
  - City Manager: Marissa Trejo
  - Police Chief: Michael Kendall

Area
  - Total: 8.81 sq mi (22.83 km^{2})
  - Land: 8.81 sq mi (22.83 km^{2})
  - Water: 0 sq mi (0.00 km^{2}) 0%
- Elevation: 230 ft (70 m)

Population (2020)
  - Total: 27,038
  - Density: 3,067/sq mi (1,184/km^{2})
- Time zone: UTC-08:00 (PST)
  - Summer (DST): UTC-07:00 (PDT)
- ZIP codes: 93245, 93246
- Area code: 559
- FIPS code: 06-41152
- GNIS feature IDs: 1660905, 2410819
- Website: www.lemoore.gov

Lemoore (/ləˈmɔːr/ lə-MOR; formerly La Tache and Lee Moore's) is a city in Kings County, California, United States. Lemoore is located 7.5 miles (12 km) west-southwest of Hanford, at an elevation of 230 feet (70 m). It is part of the Hanford-Corcoran Metropolitan Statistical Area (MSA Code 25260). The population was 27,038 at the 2020 Census.

Lemoore is home to Naval Air Station Lemoore, a master jet base housing F-18 and F-35 squadrons assigned to the Pacific fleet.

== History ==
Dr. Lovern Lee Moore first made his home in what was western Tulare County, California—now the City of Lemoore—in April 1871. It was on the northern shoreline (just above the high-water mark) of Tulare Lake, then potentially the largest freshwater body of water in the US, outside of the Great Lakes. (Note: The maps published by Thos. H. Thompson in 1892, shows three high water levels of the giant Tulare Lake in different years. The highest lake level, the one Thompson labeled "original lake line" skirts or touches the 1892 town of Lemoore's south-west corner at the current highway 41. On that map, Lemoore is on the east bank, and Lemoore Naval Air Station would have been on the west bank of the northern tip of Tulare Lake at its maximum size. By 1892, the shoreline is shown five miles to the south of Lemoore. It is presumed that by "original lake line" Thompson meant the still discernible high water line, and that this is near the elevation of the natural spillway and marks the maximum size of Tulare Lake during flood years. According to Google Earth map elevations, the current physical "spillway" would be north-west of Lemoore at the intersection of Grangeville Blvd. and 24th at elevation 213 or 214 feet at the natural "ridge" or "dam" top separating the San Joaquin River watershed from the Kings River drainage. The nearby remnant stream oxbows of Bogg Slough marks the natural, pre-dammed start of the Fresno Slough. However, current elevations (and the spillway's location) may have changed due to land subsidence reportedly caused in nearby areas by ground water pumping. Because the land is so flat, just a few feet in changed elevation can translate to more than a mile in distance.) The American pioneers from eastern states saw this as a stretch of vast virgin land on which sheep, horses and wild animals had grazed but had never been cultivated.

By the time Dr. Moore arrived, scores of individual farms dotted the landscape, but as Tulare Lake retreated, more became continually available. The soil was rich and productive as it had been brought down and deposited for centuries from the high Sierras by the Kings River and the Los Gatos Creek alluvial fan from the Coast Range. Wells were easy to dig, as the water level was unusually high. So water was plentiful for irrigation from shallow wells farm families installed. Raising of sheep and grains were principal concerns of farmers in the area.

However, the pioneers were somewhat isolated, since they had to drive by horse as far as 6 miles (9.7 km) northeast to Grangeville settlement, to get mail or newspapers. It was even farther to Kingston for other supplies. Hanford was not founded until later in 1877. Even the area was called by various names, believed to be of Indian origin, such as Latache, Tailholt, or just, in English, the Lake District.

Dr. Lee Moore proved to be a man of vision. He decided to knit together the scores of surrounding farm families, to secure a post office, and some local center for conducting business which could be hastened by direct means of communicating with the outside world. He must also have had the hope of attracting the railroad, which was then being planned but was not built until six years later.

The first steps he took to organize a community began in early 1872, when he surveyed a 10-acre (40,000 m^{2}) subdivision in what is now the land immediately west of the present Lemoore High School. In August 1872 he had established the first real estate development in this district and had laid out and named the streets after other pioneer families. In the summer of 1872 land auctions were held and lots went to the highest bidder. Prices ranged from $75 to $150 per lot. One business lot was sold for $600, rated as a very high price, considering the value of the dollar in 1872. Dr. Moore's home was believed to be situated where the grammar school playground on Bush Street is now located.

The year 1872 was a busy one for the inhabitants. In addition to sales at the subdivision and putting in of streets, new buildings for homes and businesses began to arise. This was the start of a real community, but it still lacked a school, a definitely accepted name, and a post office.

All these developed in the next eventful year of 1873. Dr. Moore had presented a signed petition to the U.S. Post Office Department in distant Washington for a post office in the new town in 1872, but his petition was not granted until 1873.

At that time it was common custom to name communities after their founders or some prominent person of the day. The naming of Hanford and Porterville are examples of this common practice.

The Lemoore post office first opened in 1875.

The U.S. Post Office objected to the name "Latache," so, Dr. Hamlin the petitioner submitted the document with the name "Lemoore" after Dr. Lovern Lee Moore. In that way the new community received its new name.

In the same year, 1873, a Mr. Armstrong donated 2 acres (8,100 m^{2}) of land for the first school building in Lemoore. It was a frame structure 18 feet (5.5 m) by 30 feet (9.1 m), completed and dedicated at a country dance held in December 1873.

The railroad came to what is now Kings County in 1877. At that date Grangeville was the largest community in the entire area. After some dispute with its residents, rail officials decided to by-pass that settlement and went through Hanford. Lemoore, by that time had shown healthy growth. It could have been through the foresight of Dr. Moore in setting a head-start in '72 which attracted the rail route to his budding community. The line was put through Lemoore in 1877 parallel to Front Street, now called E Street.

This re-directed the business growth of the town toward the railroad station from where Dr. Moore first encouraged residence and business activity. It eventually made E (Front Street) and D Streets the main business avenues of the community.

After 25 years of service to the Lemoore area, Dr. Lee Moore died on September 11, 1898. The number of new residents he had helped bring into the world numbered in the thousands.

In 1883 the town then had a flouring mill of 200 barrels daily capacity. It was an important shipping point for wheat and wool, and not long afterwards became a center for fruit, but in its early period many fires retarded its growth.

Many of the early settlers of the Lemoore District were cultured people, and Lemoore attained a reputation for literary and musical accomplishments unmatched by many pioneer towns. There was an early literary society that had a long and noteworthy existence.

In 1893 Tulare County, by act of the State Legislature, was split into two areas. Western Tulare County became what is now Kings County. In creating the new County of Kings there was keen competition between Hanford and Lemoore as to which would become the county seat. By that time Hanford's population had exceeded Lemoore's and the addition of the Santa Fe Railroad's main line through Hanford gave it the advantage of two rail lines instead of one. The result was the construction of the County Courthouse in that city.

Lemoore became an incorporated city on July 4, 1900, which opened a new era for the community, with government by an elected City Council. The first president of the City Council was Charles Bailey. Lemoore residents have always taken a keen interest in local political activities.

Bob E. Baldock designed and opened for play in 1928 a 9-hole golf course. The City of Lemoore had it remodeled in 1991, by Bill Phillips to add to the community an exciting 18-hole golf course.

=== Military ===
In 1941, the Lemoore Army Air Field opened as an Army Air Forces training field. The Federal Government acquired 1,466 acres (593 ha) for the Lemoore Basic Flying School in 1941–42. Approximately 488 acres (197 ha) were acquired by grant deed from individual land owners, 963 acres (390 ha) were leased from the City of Lemoore and 14 acres (5.7 ha) were acquired by transfer from the National Housing Agency. In 1961, The Army Air Field was converted into what is now Naval Air Station Lemoore, a Naval Aviation base 7 miles west of Lemoore. Since 1961, The base has grown to become the largest Master Jet Base in the Navy. NAS Lemoore hosts five carrier air wings, mostly made up of F-18s and F-35 jets.

== Geography ==
The maps published by Thos. H. Thompson in 1892, shows three high water levels of the giant Tulare Lake in different years. The highest lake level, the one Thompson labeled "original lake line" skirts or touches the 1892 town of Lemoore's south-west corner at the current intersection of State Route 41 and State Route 198. On Thompson's map, Lemoore is on the east bank, and about five miles away Lemoore Naval Air Station would have been on the west bank of the pointy northern tip of Tulare Lake at its maximum size. At the extreme northern point of Tulare Lake was its natural, occasional "flood year" spillway northbound into Bogg Slough, Fresno Slough, and the San Joaquin River's watershed, onward to the sea at San Francisco Bay. The present (2014) remaining marshy remnants of Bogg Slough, with its unfarmed oxbow structures may be the last of their kind to avoid the plow in the Kings-San Joaquin river system. This "summit," or spillway is located just a few miles north-west of Lemoore, off Grangeville Blvd at elevation 210 feet (64 m). The spillway was wide, shallow and confusing, choked with tall tule rushes, and without observable landmarks. Only one commercial boat is known to have sailed from Tulare Lake to the San Francisco delta. Tulare Lake had huge economic importance in the region, both for the very large population of Indians, and the white pioneers. The lake supported a large commercial fishery feeding San Francisco, and a steam powered ferry servicing several towns and settlements. The receding lake continually opened up new agricultural lands for settlement. Because of its source streams being diverted, the last time the lake overflowed was 1878, and today it no longer exists.

Because the natural summit or border between the Kings River basin and the San Joaquin River's watershed, and the Kings River itself nearly intersect near Lemoore, a number of huge water works that control regional water flow are also located nearby. For example, in flood years the Kings River is diverted west into the so-called "North Fork Kings River," to Crescent Weir and related major levees eastward to the north-flowing Fresno Slough and to the sea, preventing a resurgence ("flooding") of Tulare Lake to the south. This "switch point" is located just north of Lemoore right off of Highway 41 and Elgin Ave at the New Island Weirs. In many cases the prehistoric Kings River bed has been obliterated and new channels have been constructed. However, as of 2014, in satellite images (such as Google maps, etc.) the remains of many of the old channels can still be detected.

Other towns built just above the Tulare Lake high-water shoreline include Kettleman City and Alpaugh (once also called Hog Island, Root Island, and Atwell's Island). Satellite maps indicate that highways, railroads, and property lines are aligned with the historic lake shores. Also, many of the farms can be seen to be much larger within its various historic shore lines than in the surrounding areas.

=== Climate ===
According to the Köppen Climate Classification system, Lemoore has a semi-arid climate, abbreviated "BSk" on climate maps.

== Demographics ==
Historical population
Census	Pop.	Note	%±
1880	463		—
1890	651		40.6%
1910	1,000		—
1920	1,355		35.5%
1930	1,399		3.2%
1940	1,711		22.3%
1950	2,153		25.8%
1960	2,561		19.0%
1970	4,219		64.7%
1980	8,832		109.3%
1990	13,622		54.2%
2000	19,712		44.7%
2010	24,531		24.4%
2020	27,038		10.2%
2024 (est.)	27,057	▲	0.1%
U.S. Decennial Census

=== 2020 census ===
As of the 2020 census, Lemoore had a population of 27,038. The population density was 3,067.6 inhabitants per square mile (1,184.4/km^{2}). The median age was 31.2 years. The age distribution was 28.2% under the age of 18, 11.0% aged 18 to 24, 30.4% aged 25 to 44, 20.5% aged 45 to 64, and 9.9% who were 65 years of age or older. For every 100 females, there were 98.1 males, and for every 100 females age 18 and over there were 95.0 males age 18 and over.

The census reported that 99.9% of the population lived in households and 0.1% were institutionalized. In addition, 98.5% of residents lived in urban areas, while 1.5% lived in rural areas.

There were 9,183 households, out of which 41.8% included children under the age of 18, 47.8% were married-couple households, 8.4% were cohabiting couple households, 25.2% had a female householder with no spouse or partner present, and 18.5% had a male householder with no spouse or partner present. 20.7% of households were one person, and 6.2% were one person aged 65 or older. The average household size was 2.94. There were 6,702 families (73.0% of all households).

There were 9,518 housing units at an average density of 1,079.9 units per square mile (417.0 units/km^{2}), of which 9,183 (96.5%) were occupied. Of occupied units, 54.3% were owner-occupied and 45.7% were occupied by renters. The homeowner vacancy rate was 1.1%, and the rental vacancy rate was 3.8%.

Racial composition as of the 2020 census
Race	Number	Percent
White	11,221	41.5%
Black or African American	1,664	6.2%
American Indian and Alaska Native	566	2.1%
Asian	2,340	8.7%
Native Hawaiian and Other Pacific Islander	115	0.4%
Some other race	6,483	24.0%
Two or more races	4,649	17.2%
Hispanic or Latino (of any race)	12,971	48.0%

=== 2023 ACS 5-year estimates ===
In 2023, the US Census Bureau estimated that the median household income was $82,189, and the per capita income was $31,492. About 11.6% of families and 14.9% of the population were below the poverty line.

=== 2010 census ===
The 2010 United States census reported that Lemoore had a population of 24,531. The population density was 2,880.4 inhabitants per square mile (1,112.1/km^{2}). The racial makeup of Lemoore was 13,925 (56.8%) White, 1,566 (6.4%) African American, 333 (1.4%) Native American, 2,010 (8.2%) Asian, 102 (0.4%) Pacific Islander, 4,935 (20.1%) from other races, and 1,660 (6.8%) from two or more races. Hispanic or Latino of any race were 9,820 persons (40.0%).

The Census reported that 24,514 people (99.9% of the population) lived in households, 11 (0%) lived in non-institutionalized group quarters, and 6 (0%) were institutionalized.

There were 8,196 households, out of which 3,787 (46.2%) had children under the age of 18 living in them, 4,076 (49.7%) were opposite-sex married couples living together, 1,387 (16.9%) had a female householder with no husband present, 607 (7.4%) had a male householder with no wife present. There were 641 (7.8%) unmarried opposite-sex partnerships, and 44 (0.5%) same-sex married couples or partnerships. 1,532 households (18.7%) were made up of individuals, and 436 (5.3%) had someone living alone who was 65 years of age or older. The average household size was 2.99. There were 6,070 families (74.1% of all households); the average family size was 3.42.

The population was spread out, with 7,547 people (30.8%) under the age of 18, 3,053 people (12.4%) aged 18 to 24, 7,184 people (29.3%) aged 25 to 44, 4,955 people (20.2%) aged 45 to 64, and 1,792 people (7.3%) who were 65 years of age or older. The median age was 28.6 years. For every 100 females, there were 99.1 males. For every 100 females age 18 and over, there were 95.4 males.

There were 8,632 housing units at an average density of 1,013.5 per square mile (391.3/km^{2}), of which 4,323 (52.7%) were owner-occupied, and 3,873 (47.3%) were occupied by renters. The homeowner vacancy rate was 2.0%; the rental vacancy rate was 5.1%. 13,562 people (55.3% of the population) lived in owner-occupied housing units and 10,952 people (44.6%) lived in rental housing units.

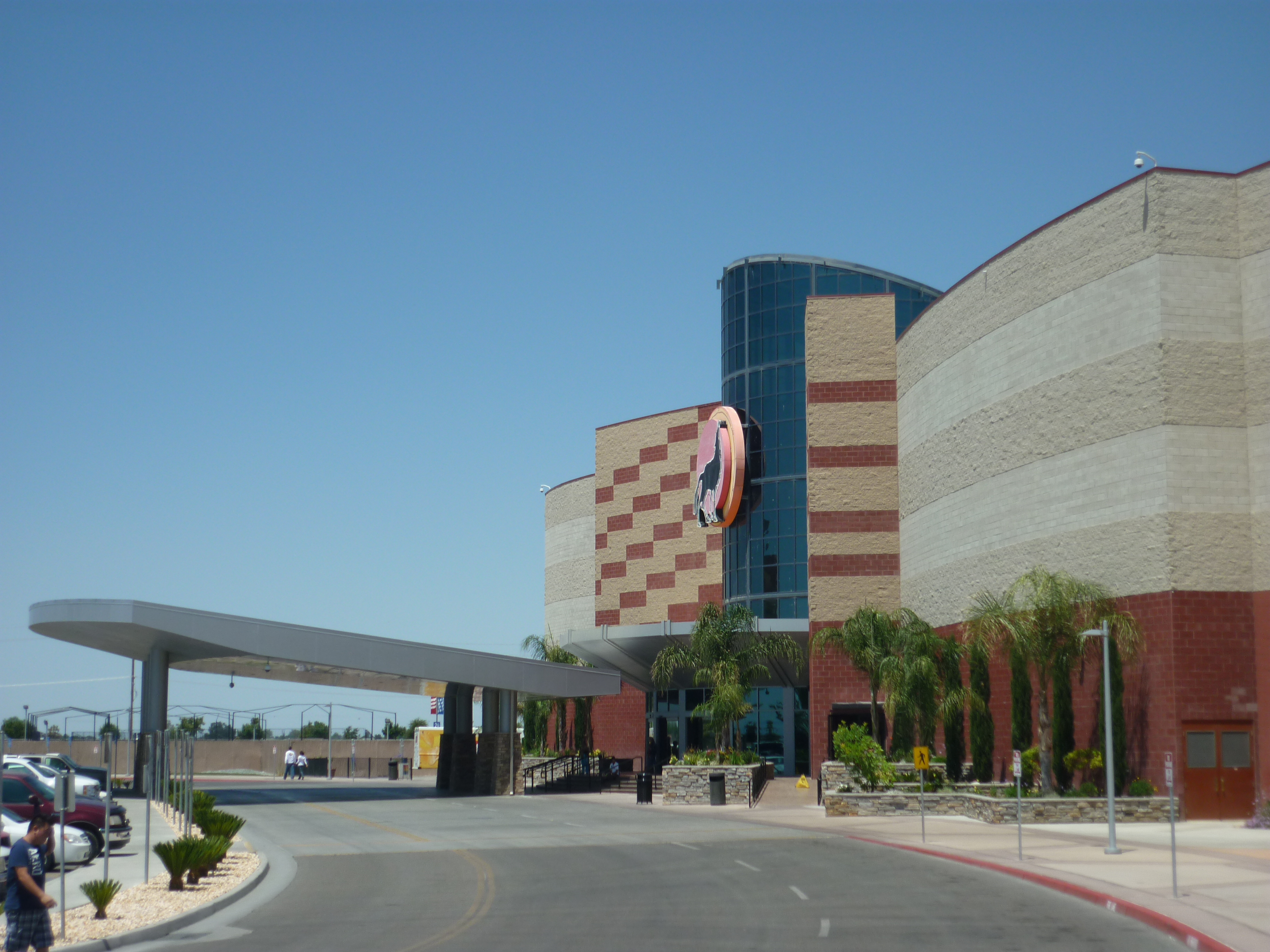
Tachi Palace Casino

At the time of the 2010 census, the median income for a household in the city was $40,314, and the median income for a family was $44,006. Males had a median income of $34,726 versus $25,759 for females. The per capita income for the city was $15,876. About 11.4% of families and 13.4% of the population were below the poverty line, including 18.2% of those under age 18 and 11.3% of those age 65 or over. The estimated unemployment rate in November 2016 was 8.3%.

== Economy ==
Major employers in Lemoore include Naval Air Station Lemoore, Tachi Palace, Leprino Foods and Olam International.

== Government ==
Lemoore is incorporated as a general law city under the California Constitution. The city has a council-manager government with a city manager appointed by the city council. The city council is made up of five members. The mayor and mayor pro tem are elected by the city council from among its members. On December 6, 2022, the city council elected Patricia Matthews as mayor. Other city council members are Frank Gornick, Jonathan Brewster, Jonathan Cruz and Stuart Lyons. Lemoore's city manager is Marissa Trejo.

=== State and federal representation ===
In the California State Legislature, Lemoore is in the 16th senatorial district, represented by Democrat Melissa Hurtado, and in the 33rd Assembly district, represented by Republican Alexandra Macedo.

In the United States House of Representatives, Lemoore is in California's 20th congressional district, represented by Republican Vince Fong.

== Transportation ==
Amtrak Thruway 18 provides a daily connection to/from 300 E Street to/from Visalia on the east, and Santa Maria on the west, with several stops in between.

== Education ==
The Lemoore Union Elementary School District provides kindergarten through eighth grade education for most of the city. It operates the following elementary and junior high schools:

- Cinnamon Elementary
- P.W. Engvall Elementary
- Lemoore Elementary
- Meadow Lane Elementary
- Liberty Middle School
- University Charter School
- Freedom Elementary

The Central Union School District serves much of the outlying parts of the Lemoore area beyond the city limits and provides kindergarten through eighth grade education. It operates the following elementary schools:

- Akers Elementary at NAS Lemoore
- Neutra Elementary at NAS Lemoore that was designed by the renowned architect Richard J. Neutra
- Central Union Elementary School
- Stratford Elementary School

The Island Union Elementary School District serves the Island District northwest of Lemoore and operates Island Elementary School which has grades kindergarten through eighth.

The Lemoore Union High School District provides public secondary education. It operates the following schools:

- Lemoore Union High School
- Donald C. Jamison High School
- Lemoore Middle College High School
- Gundacker Community Day School
- Yokuts High School at the Santa Rosa Rancheria

West Hills College Lemoore is a community college in Lemoore.

Private Schools in Lemoore include:

- Kings Christian School - pre-kindergarten through high school.
- Mary Immaculate Queen School - kindergarten through eighth grade.

== Media ==
The city formerly had a local paper called The Lemoore Advance and the Advance Extra, which is now defunct.

KGAR, 93.3 FM, is a low-power FM radio station operated by Lemoore High School students on the campus of Lemoore High School.

== Notable people ==
- David Ausberry, professional football player for the Oakland Raiders
- Astronaut Michael A Baker, retired captain in the United States Navy, former NASA astronaut, and the International Space Station Program Manager for International and Crew Operations, at NASA's Johnson Space Center. Graduated from Lemoore Union High School, Lemoore, California, in 1971; received a bachelor of science degree in aerospace engineering from the University of Texas in 1975.
- Eric Fox, former outfielder for the Oakland Athletics
- Former NFL fullback Lorenzo Neal, played for Lemoore High School and California State University, Fresno. Neal was a state champion wrestler as a heavyweight for Lemoore High School as well.
- Chris Pendleton, folkstyle and freestyle wrestler, two-time NCAA National Wrestling Champion and three-time All-American
- Alex Perez, flyweight mixed martial artist fighting in the Ultimate Fighting Championship. Perez started his combat sports career as a wrestler, competing at Lemoore High School and Lemoore College (formerly West Hills Community College).
- Rock musician and Journey leader Steve Perry, moved to Lemoore from Hanford as a teenager and began developing his craft while attending high school there.
- Daniel Rhoads, a California pioneer and rancher who helped rescue the Donner Party. El Adobe de los Robles Rancho (California Historical Landmark #206), a building built by Rhoads, can be found north of Lemoore along state highway 41.
- Sprinter Tommie Smith, ran high school track at Lemoore High School before setting a world record in the 200 m at the 1968 Summer Olympics in Mexico City. Smith, along with his teammate John Carlos, is best known for his Black Power salute during the medal ceremony.
- Zilpha Keatley Snyder, noted author of books for children and young adults, was born in Lemoore. She wrote 43 books in her lifetime, including three Newbery Honor books.
