= Lemoore High School =

Public high school in California, United States

Lemoore Union High School

Location
- 101 E. Bush St; Lemoore, California 93245; 36°17′52″N 119°46′48″W

Information
- Type: Public
- Established: 1901
- School district: Lemoore Union High School District
- Principal: Brady Holaday
- Teaching staff: 84.89 (FTE)
- Grades: 9-12
- Enrollment: 1,889 (2025–2026)
- Student to teacher ratio: 21.50
- Colors: Purple and Gold
- Mascot: Tiger
- Website: lemoorehigh.luhsd.k12.ca.us

Lemoore Union High School (more commonly known as Lemoore High School) is a four-year public high school located in Lemoore, California. It serves grades 9 through 12 and is accredited through the California Department of Education. The school's enrollment area covers Lemoore and additional areas in Kings County, California, and is one of two public high schools in the Lemoore Union High School District (the other is Jamison High Continuation).

== History ==
Lemoore High School was originally established in the year 1900. There were 35 students in that first class, and in the old Heinlen Hall they were offered classes in Latin, ancient history, algebra, and English. In 1902, the high school moved after Lemoore voters approved a school bond to build a new facility on Fox Street. Lemoore High School's first graduating class in 1904 consisted of three people: Margaret Hayes, Arthur Blank, and Ed Blank. Three years later, in 1907, Lemoore became an accredited institution. Lemoore's first football team was formed from the 18 boys enrolled in 1909. Their first school bus, a 20-passenger, 15 mile per hour average speed vehicle, made its debut in 1916. As Lemoore expanded, the population of the student body outgrew the building on Fox Street. Multiple calls for a larger building were made, but due to incomplete plans and poorly timed frosts, it was not until a third bond election in 1923 that a $325,000 bond was approved to build another school. The current school, located at 101 East Bush Street, was based on a design made by the late William Weeks. The school was opened on February 1, 1924. Ellen Truckell was the 1929 Student Body President, the first female president to serve at Lemoore High School.

Over the next thirty years, various one-off rooms and small buildings were added to the high school. In 1940, the music building was added to provide a band and choir room, ceramics studio, and classrooms. The auto shop was added to the existing shop building. In 1941, a swimming pool was added; in 1953, the agricultural building; in 1958, the J.F. Graham Memorial Gymnasium; in 1960, the business building; and in 1962, the science wing and the administration building. The home economics building was completed in 1963, and was followed in turn by the library and tennis courts in 1964. The football stadium and bus garage were finished in 1965. The metal shop was erected in 1969, along with the industrial drawing and electronics classrooms. In 1970, the girls' gym was remodeled and the exercise room added.

In 1973, a $2.75 million bond was supported by the taxpayers to establish the ten classrooms in the S-Wing, the cafeteria, wood shop, and an addition to the boys' locker room. In 1978, the main building was renovated. In 1991, a new swimming pool was completed, and the old pool buildings were converted to classrooms.

In 1993, the Gundacker Center was established to house the alternative education programs, such as Continuation, Adult Ed, Independent Study, Pregnant Minors, and Child Care programs. The Gundacker Center was dedicated to Gertrude Gundacker, a longtime faculty member. The Continuation School is dedicated to Don Jamison, the first continuation principal and a track coach.

== Demographics ==
As of 2026, Lemoore High School has a student population of 1,889 that is 0.4% unknown, 0.7% Pacific Islander, 1.7% Native American, 3.7% Asian, 4.3% black, 5.4% multiracial, 20.5% white, and 63.2% Hispanic. The school's average graduation rate is 94%.

== Athletics ==
Lemoore High School offers various athletics programs, both single-gender and co-ed. For boys' sports, football, baseball, basketball, golf, soccer, tennis, and wrestling are offered. For girls' sports, basketball, soccer, softball, and wrestling are offered. Swimming, as well as track and field, are the school's two co-ed sports.

== Feeder schools ==
The Lemoore Union Elementary School District contains Lemoore's public elementary and junior high schools that graduate students directly into the Lemoore Union High School District. These seven schools provide kindergarten through eighth grade education for most of Lemoore.

- Cinnamon Elementary
- P.W. Engvall Elementary
- Lemoore Elementary
- Meadow Lane Elementary
- Liberty Middle School
- University Charter School
- Freedom Elementary

== Notable alumni ==
- Tommie Smith, Olympic Gold Medalist and civil rights activist
- Steve Perry, musician and former lead singer of Journey
- Michael A. Baker, astronaut
- David Ausberry, NFL football player
- Charlie Jones, NFL football player
- Larry Jones, NFL football player
- Dale Messer, NFL football player
- Lorenzo Neal, NFL football player
- Kelly Rondestvedt, investment banker and Hereditary Princess of Saxe-Coburg and Gotha
- Alex Perez, professional MMA fighter competing in the Ultimate Fighting Championship (UFC)
- Isaiah Martinez, freestyle wrestler and graduated folkstyle wrestler
- Chris Pendleton, 2X NCAA Wrestling Champion and Head Wrestling Coach at Oregon State University
