= Grangeville =

Grangeville may refer to:

- Grangeville, California
- Grangeville, Idaho
- Grangeville, a play by Samuel D. Hunter
