= KGAR-LP =

- Lemoore, California; United States
- Broadcast area: Lemoore, California
- Frequency: 93.3 MHz
- Branding: KGAR 93.3 Tiger Radio

Programming
- Format: Adult album alternative

Ownership
- Owner: Lemoore Union High School District

History
- Call sign meaning: sounds like "GRRRR"

Technical information
- Licensing authority: FCC
- Facility ID: 124421
- Class: L1
- ERP: 91 watts
- HAAT: 31.3 meters (103 ft)
- Transmitter coordinates: 36°17′51″N 119°46′45″W

Links
- Public license information: LMS

KGAR-LP (93.3 FM) is a high school radio station broadcasting a variety format. Licensed to Lemoore, California, United States, the station serves the Visalia-Tulare area. The station is currently owned by Lemoore Union High School District.
