= Tent Hills =

Ridge in California

- Location within California Location within the United States

Highest point
- Elevation: 1,516 ft (462 m)
- Coordinates: 35°50′53.84″N 120°9′29.77″W

Geography
- Location: Kings County, California, United States

The Tent Hills are a ridge in Kings County, California, in the United States.

When viewed from afar, the Tent Hills are said to resemble tents, hence the name.
