= May Merrill Miller =

American poet (1894–1975)

May Merrill Miller (1894–1975) was an American woman writer best known for her novel First the Blade which offers a unique view of the domestic life of California pioneers as well as on the Mussel Slough Tragedy.

== Life and work ==
Miller was born in 1894 in Hanford, California. Growing up the granddaughter of early California pioneers, Miller was privy to many stories of the earliest California settlers. Consequently, she gained an intimate understanding of the early southern San Joaquin landscape and the domestic life of those pioneers who settled there. Miller attended the University of California and the University of Minnesota and participated in the prestigious Bread Loaf Writers' Conference hosted by Middlebury College. At this conference, she studied with the western historian and novelist Bernard DeVoto and subsequently converted the various stories she heard growing up into a unified novel. The resulting novel, First the Blade, was published in 1938. It depicts the daily life of Californian pioneers from the perspective of a fictional woman settler. The novel also includes a fictionalized account of the Mussel Slough gunfight that resulted from a land dispute between local pioneer settlers and the Southern Pacific Railroad. The novel has been praised for its unique female perspective on pioneer life as well as for its verisimilitude and detailed realism. In 1949, Miller published a book of poetry entitled Mother Lode, 1849 to 1949.

== Legacy ==
The University of California, Los Angeles, awards the May Merrill Miller award in alternate years to an undergraduate for work in fiction or poetry.
