= National Register of Historic Places listings in Kings County, California =

Location of Kings County in California

This is a list of the National Register of Historic Places listings in Kings County, California.

This is intended to be a complete list of the properties and districts on the National Register of Historic Places in Kings County, California, United States. Latitude and longitude coordinates are provided for many National Register properties and districts; these locations may be seen together in a Google map.

There are 4 properties and districts listed on the National Register in the county.

This National Park Service list is complete through NPS recent listings posted September 4, 2026.

== Current listings ==
	Name on the Register	Image	Date listed	Location	City or town	Description
1	Hanford Carnegie Library	Hanford Carnegie Library	December 17, 1981 (#81000152)	109 E. 8th St. 36°19′39″N 119°38′43″W	Hanford	
2	Kings County Courthouse	Kings County Courthouse	September 21, 1978 (#78003063)	114 W. 8th St. 36°19′41″N 119°38′49″W	Hanford	
3	Taoist Temple	Taoist Temple	June 13, 1972 (#72000226)	No. 12 China Alley; 36°19′41″N 119°38′16″W	Hanford	
4	Witt Site		May 6, 1971 (#71000141)	Address Restricted	Kettleman City	

== See also ==
- List of National Historic Landmarks in California
- National Register of Historic Places listings in California
- California Historical Landmarks in Kings County, California
