= Lemoore Union High School District =

School district in California, United States

Location
- 5 Powell Ave. Lemoore, California 93245 United States

Other information
- Website: www.luhsd.k12.ca.us

Lemoore Union High School District is a public school district based in Kings County, California, United States. The District includes Lemoore High School.
