= Home Garden, California =

Home Garden
- census-designated place
- Location in Kings County and the U.S. state of California

- Location in the United States
- Coordinates: 36°18′12″N 119°38′10″W
- Country: United States
- State: California
- County: Kings

Area
  - Total: 0.442 sq mi (1.145 km^{2})
  - Land: 0.442 sq mi (1.145 km^{2})
  - Water: 0 sq mi (0 km^{2}) 0%
- Elevation: 246 ft (75 m)

Population (2020)
  - Total: 1,653
  - Density: 3,739/sq mi (1,444/km^{2})
- Time zone: UTC-8 (Pacific (PST))
  - Summer (DST): UTC-7 (PDT)
- ZIP code: 93230
- Area code: 559
- FIPS code: 06-34281
- GNIS feature ID: 1867029

Home Garden is a census-designated place (CDP) in Kings County, California, United States. The community is about 1.5 miles (2.4 km) southeast of the city of Hanford. It is part of the Hanford–Corcoran Metropolitan Statistical Area. The population was 1,653 at the 2020 United States census.

== Geography ==
Home Garden is located at 36°18′12″N 119°38′10″W.

According to the United States Census Bureau, the CDP has a total area of 0.4 square miles (1.0 km^{2}), all land.

== Demographics ==
Historical population
Census	Pop.	Note	%±
1960	1,541		—
1970	2,494		61.8%
1980	1,495		−40.1%
1990	1,549		3.6%
2000	1,702		9.9%
2010	1,761		3.5%
2020	1,653		−6.1%
U.S. Decennial Census; 1850–1870 1880-1890; 1900 1910 1920; 1930 1940 1950; 1960 1970 1980; 1990 2000 2010

Home Garden first appeared as an unincorporated place in the 1970 U.S. census; and as a census designated place in the 1980 United States census.

=== 2020 census ===
As of the 2020 census, Home Garden had a population of 1,653 and a population density of 3,739.8 inhabitants per square mile (1,443.9/km^{2}).

100.0% of residents lived in urban areas, while 0.0% lived in rural areas.

Racial composition as of the 2020 census
Race	Number	Percent
White	419	25.3%
Black or African American	170	10.3%
American Indian and Alaska Native	27	1.6%
Asian	43	2.6%
Native Hawaiian and Other Pacific Islander	3	0.2%
Some other race	701	42.4%
Two or more races	290	17.5%
Hispanic or Latino (of any race)	1,210	73.2%

The whole population lived in households. There were 429 households, out of which 212 (49.4%) had children under the age of 18 living in them, 197 (45.9%) were married-couple households, 42 (9.8%) were cohabiting couple households, 108 (25.2%) had a female householder with no spouse or partner present, and 82 (19.1%) had a male householder with no spouse or partner present. 64 households (14.9%) were one person, and 25 (5.8%) were one person aged 65 or older. The average household size was 3.85. There were 347 families (80.9% of all households).

The age distribution was 526 people (31.8%) under the age of 18, 146 people (8.8%) aged 18 to 24, 435 people (26.3%) aged 25 to 44, 371 people (22.4%) aged 45 to 64, and 175 people (10.6%) who were 65 years of age or older. The median age was 31.5 years. For every 100 females, there were 101.3 males, and for every 100 females age 18 and over, there were 99.5 males.

There were 469 housing units, of which 40 (8.5%) were vacant and 429 (91.5%) were occupied. Of the occupied units, 241 (56.2%) were owner-occupied and 188 (43.8%) were occupied by renters. The homeowner vacancy rate was 1.2% and the rental vacancy rate was 8.5%.

=== 2010 census ===
At the 2010 census Home Garden had a population of 1,761. The population density was 2,854.0 inhabitants per square mile (1,101.9/km^{2}). The racial makeup of Home Garden was 652 (37.0%) White, 221 (12.5%) African American, 63 (3.6%) Native American, 50 (2.8%) Asian, 8 (0.5%) Pacific Islander, 677 (38.4%) from other races, and 90 (5.1%) from two or more races. Hispanic or Latino of any race were 1,189 persons (67.5%).

The census reported that 1,753 people (99.5% of the population) lived in households, 8 (0.5%) lived in non-institutionalized group quarters, and no one was institutionalized.

There were 437 households, 252 (57.7%) had children under the age of 18 living in them, 214 (49.0%) were opposite-sex married couples living together, 112 (25.6%) had a female householder with no husband present, 50 (11.4%) had a male householder with no wife present. There were 49 (11.2%) unmarried opposite-sex partnerships, and 1 (0.2%) same-sex married couples or partnerships. 42 households (9.6%) were one person and 18 (4.1%) had someone living alone who was 65 or older. The average household size was 4.01. There were 376 families (86.0% of households); the average family size was 4.16.

The age distribution was 601 people (34.1%) under the age of 18, 203 people (11.5%) aged 18 to 24, 440 people (25.0%) aged 25 to 44, 368 people (20.9%) aged 45 to 64, and 149 people (8.5%) who were 65 or older. The median age was 27.9 years. For every 100 females, there were 100.8 males. For every 100 females age 18 and over, there were 100.7 males.

There were 461 housing units at an average density of 747.1 per square mile, of the occupied units 210 (48.1%) were owner-occupied and 227 (51.9%) were rented. The homeowner vacancy rate was 4.5%; the rental vacancy rate was 2.6%. 786 people (44.6% of the population) lived in owner-occupied housing units and 967 people (54.9%) lived in rental housing units.

== Economy ==
At the time of the 2000 census, the median household income was $25,450, and the median family income was $24,214. Males had a median income of $26,071 versus $14,338 for females. The per capita income for the CDP was $22,357. About 33.5% of families and 41.9% of the population were below the poverty line, including 53.5% of those under age 18 and 24.4% of those age 65 or over. The estimated unemployment rate was 12.6% in November 2016.

== Politics ==
Home Garden is part of California's 22nd congressional district, which is held by Republican David Valadao. The community is represented in the California State Senate by Democrat Melissa Hurtado and in the California State Assembly by Republican Alexandra Macedo.

Home Garden is represented on the Kings County Board of Supervisors by Richard Valle of Corcoran.
