= Hardwick, California =

Hardwick
- census-designated place
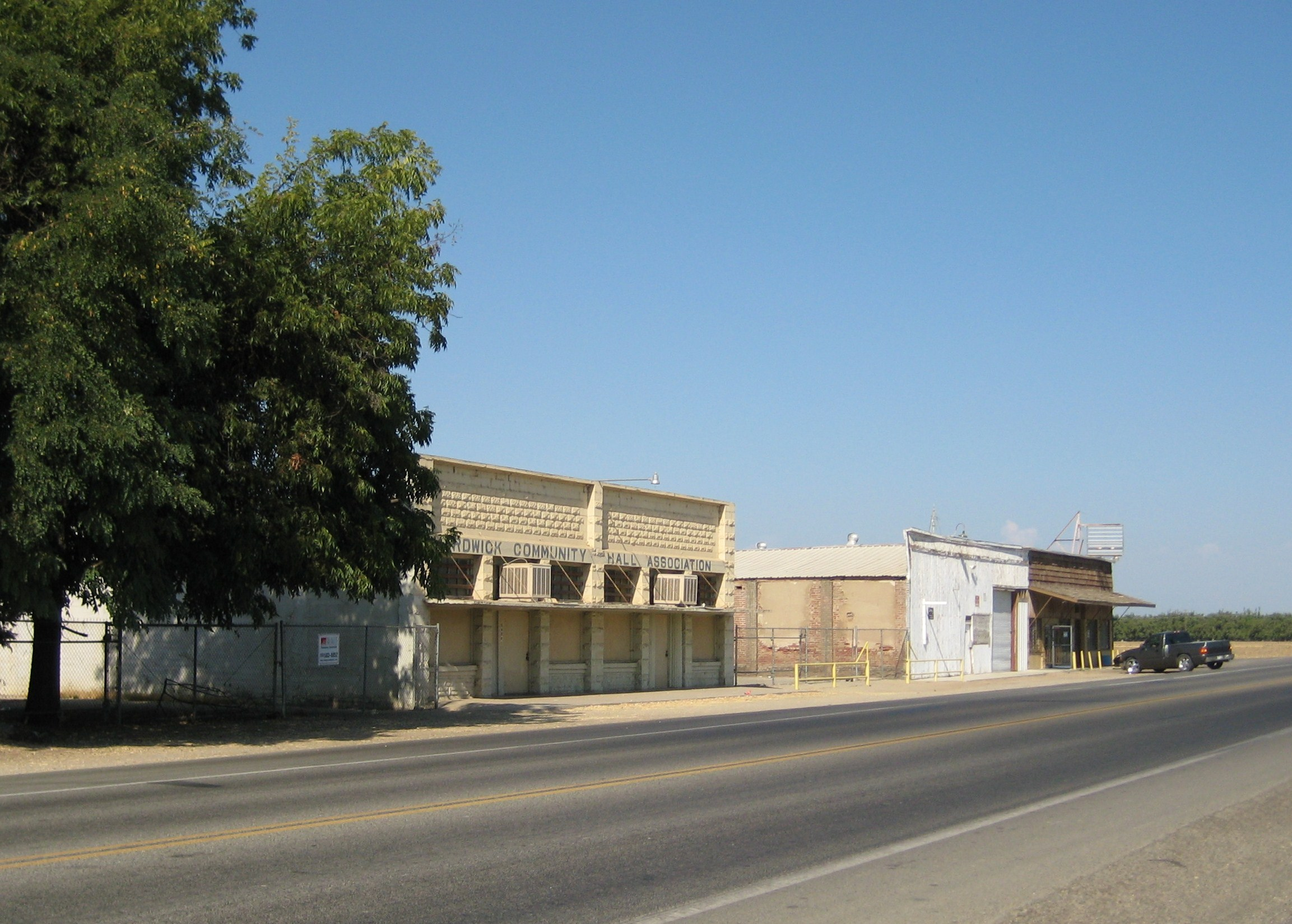
- Hardwick, California

- Location of Hardwick in Kings County, California.

- Location in California
- Coordinates: 36°24′05″N 119°43′07″W
- Country: United States
- State: California
- County: Kings

Area
  - Total: 0.139 sq mi (0.360 km^{2})
  - Land: 0.139 sq mi (0.360 km^{2})
  - Water: 0 sq mi (0 km^{2}) 0%
- Elevation: 249 ft (76 m)

Population (2020)
  - Total: 151
  - Density: 1,090/sq mi (419/km^{2})
- Time zone: UTC-8 (Pacific (PST))
  - Summer (DST): UTC-7 (PDT)
- GNIS feature IDs: 1660720; 2628738

Hardwick is a census-designated place (CDP) in Kings County, California, United States. It is part of the Hanford-Corcoran metropolitan area. The population was 151 at the 2020 Census. Hardwick is located approximately 6.5 miles (10 km) northwest of Hanford, at an elevation of 249 feet (76 m).

Hardwick is in the San Joaquin Valley along Excelsior Avenue, between 14th and 15th Avenues. The Kings River runs 1.2 miles (1.9 km) north of the community. Its ZIP Code is 93230 and the community is inside area code 559.

The Kings County Fire Department operates a fire station in Hardwick.

The community is located in the Kings River-Hardwick School District.

== History ==
Hardwick was reportedly named to commemorate an official of the Southern Pacific Railroad.

A post office was established in Hardwick in 1895, discontinued in 1904, reestablished in 1909, and finally permanently closed in 1942. Subsequently, the community has been served by the post office located in Hanford.

The first school in the community was moved from the then-fading town of Kingston. Another schoolhouse was reportedly built in 1893. Subsequently, a new school was constructed in 1914 and operated until the Hardwick and Kings River schools unified in 1962. The present fire station is located on the site of that school.

== Demographics ==
Historical population
Census	Pop.	Note	%±
2010	138		—
2020	151		9.4%
U.S. Decennial Census; 1850–1870 1880-1890; 1900 1910 1920; 1930 1940 1950; 1960 1970 1980; 1990 2000 2010

Hardwick first appeared as a census designated place in the 2010 U.S. census.

The 2020 United States census reported that Hardwick had a population of 151. The population density was 1,086.3 inhabitants per square mile (419.4/km^{2}). The racial makeup of Hardwick was 41 (27.2%) White, 5 (3.3%) African American, 0 (0.0%) Native American, 0 (0.0%) Asian, 0 (0.0%) Pacific Islander, 69 (45.7%) from other races, and 36 (23.8%) from two or more races. Hispanic or Latino of any race were 118 persons (78.1%).

The whole population lived in households. There were 45 households. Of these, 18 (40.0%) had children under the age of 18 living in them, 19 (42.2%) were married-couple households, 6 (13.3%) were cohabiting couple households. 12 (26.7%) had a female householder with no partner present, and 8 (17.8%) had a male householder with no partner present. 8 households (17.8%) were one person, and 1 (2.2%) were one person aged 65 or older. The average household size was 3.36. There were 31 families (68.9% of all households).

The age distribution was 39 people (25.8%) under the age of 18, 20 people (13.2%) aged 18 to 24, 44 people (29.1%) aged 25 to 44, 27 people (17.9%) aged 45 to 64, and 21 people (13.9%) who were 65 years of age or older. The median age was 32.8 years. There were 60 males and 91 females.

There were 45 housing units, which were all occupied, 16 (35.6%) by homeowners and 29 (64.4%) by renters.
