= Lemoore Station, California =

- census-designated place
- Location in Kings County and the U.S. state of California

- Location in the United States
- Coordinates: 36°15′38″N 119°53′31″W
- Country: United States
- State: California
- County: Kings

Area
  - Total: 4.234 sq mi (10.965 km^{2})
  - Land: 4.234 sq mi (10.965 km^{2})
  - Water: 0 sq mi (0 km^{2}) 0%
- Elevation: 226 ft (69 m)

Population (2020)
  - Total: 6,568
  - Density: 1,551/sq mi (599.0/km^{2})
- Time zone: UTC-8 (Pacific (PST))
  - Summer (DST): UTC-7 (PDT)
- ZIP code: 93245
- Area code: 559
- FIPS code: 06-41166

Lemoore Station is a census-designated place (CDP) in Naval Air Station Lemoore, Kings County, California, United States. It is part of the Hanford–Corcoran Metropolitan Statistical Area. The population was 6,568 as of the 2020 United States census.

== Geography ==
Lemoore Station is located at 36°15′38″N 119°53′31″W (36.260534, -119.891936).

According to the United States Census Bureau, the CDP has a total area of 4.2 square miles (11 km^{2}), all land.

=== Climate ===
According to the Köppen Climate Classification system, Lemoore Station has a semi-arid climate, abbreviated "BSk" on climate maps.

== Demographics ==
Historical population
Census	Pop.	Note	%±
1970	8,512		—
1980	5,888		−30.8%
1990	0		−100.0%
2000	5,749		—
2010	7,438		29.4%
2020	6,568		−11.7%
U.S. Decennial Census; 1850–1870 1880-1890; 1900 1910 1920; 1930 1940 1950; 1960 1970 1980; 1990 2000 2010

Lemoore Station first appeared as an unincorporated place in the 1970 U.S. census; and as a census designated place in the 1980 United States census. No census was conducted in 1990 although it remained a CDP.

=== 2020 census ===
As of the 2020 census, Lemoore Station had a population of 6,568. The population density was 1,551.3 inhabitants per square mile (599.0/km^{2}). The median age was 22.8 years. The age distribution was 34.6% under the age of 18, 22.9% from 18 to 24, 39.5% from 25 to 44, 2.4% from 45 to 64, and 0.6% who were 65 years of age or older. For every 100 females, there were 120.7 males, and for every 100 females age 18 and over, there were 132.7 males.

Racial composition as of the 2020 census
Race	Number	Percent
White	3,566	54.3%
Black or African American	933	14.2%
American Indian and Alaska Native	95	1.4%
Asian	447	6.8%
Native Hawaiian and Other Pacific Islander	89	1.4%
Some other race	510	7.8%
Two or more races	928	14.1%
Hispanic or Latino (of any race)	1,549	23.6%

The census reported that 82.8% of the population lived in households, 17.2% lived in non-institutionalized group quarters, and no one was institutionalized. In addition, 100.0% of residents lived in urban areas and 0.0% lived in rural areas.

There were 1,598 households, of which 73.7% had children under the age of 18 living in them. Of all households, 85.4% were married-couple households, 0.7% were cohabiting couple households, 7.4% had a female householder with no spouse or partner present, and 6.5% had a male householder with no spouse or partner present. About 4.5% of all households were one-person households, and 0.6% had someone living alone who was 65 years of age or older. The average household size was 3.4, and there were 1,512 families (94.6% of all households).

There were 1,799 housing units at an average density of 424.9 units per square mile (164.1 units/km^{2}), of which 11.2% were vacant. The homeowner vacancy rate was 0.0% and the rental vacancy rate was 7.2%. Of occupied housing units, 1.1% were owner-occupied and 98.9% were occupied by renters.

=== Demographic estimates ===
In 2023, the US Census Bureau estimated that 7.0% of the population were foreign-born. Of all people aged 5 or older, 79.4% spoke only English at home, 14.9% spoke Spanish, 1.4% spoke other Indo-European languages, 3.8% spoke Asian or Pacific Islander languages, and 0.5% spoke other languages. Of those aged 25 or older, 97.3% were high school graduates and 17.9% had a bachelor's degree.

=== Income and poverty ===
The median household income in 2023 was $65,781, and the per capita income was $27,108. About 6.9% of families and 9.8% of the population were below the poverty line.

=== 2010 census ===
The 2010 United States census reported that Lemoore Station had a population of 7,438. The population density was 1,768.7 inhabitants per square mile (682.9/km^{2}). The racial makeup of Lemoore Station was 4,883 (65.6%) White, 729 (9.8%) African American, 70 (0.9%) Native American, 560 (7.5%) Asian, 53 (0.7%) Pacific Islander, 418 (5.6%) from other races, and 725 (9.7%) from two or more races. Hispanic or Latino of any race were 1,445 persons (19.4%).

The Census reported that 5,495 people (73.9% of the population) lived in households, 1,923 (25.9%) lived in non-institutionalized group quarters, and 20 (0.3%) were institutionalized.

There were 1,585 households, out of which 1,253 (79.1%) had children under the age of 18 living in them, 1,382 (87.2%) were opposite-sex married couples living together, 133 (8.4%) had a female householder with no husband present, 26 (1.6%) had a male householder with no wife present. There were 8 (0.5%) unmarried opposite-sex partnerships, and 11 (0.7%) same-sex married couples or partnerships. 37 households (2.3%) were made up of individuals, and 1 (0.1%) had someone living alone who was 65 years of age or older. The average household size was 3.47. There were 1,541 families (97.2% of all households); the average family size was 3.52.

The population was spread out, with 2,407 people (32.4%) under the age of 18, 2,205 people (29.6%) aged 18 to 24, 2,682 people (36.1%) aged 25 to 44, 130 people (1.7%) aged 45 to 64, and 14 people (0.2%) who were 65 years of age or older. The median age was 22.5 years. For every 100 females, there were 144.2 males. For every 100 females age 18 and over, there were 166.8 males.

There were 1,627 housing units at an average density of 386.9 per square mile (149.4/km^{2}), of which 5 (0.3%) were owner-occupied, and 1,580 (99.7%) were occupied by renters. The homeowner vacancy rate was 0%; the rental vacancy rate was 2.1%. 19 people (0.3% of the population) lived in owner-occupied housing units and 5,476 people (73.6%) lived in rental housing units.

== Politics ==
In the California State Legislature, Lemoore is in the 16th senatorial district, represented by Democrat Melissa Hurtado, and in the 33rd Assembly district, represented by Republican Alexandra Macedo. Federally, Lemoore is in California's 20th congressional district, represented by Republican Vince Fong.

Lemoore Station is represented on the Kings County Board of Supervisors by Joe Neves.
