= Mussel Slough Tragedy =

1880 gun battle in Hanford, California

- Mussel Slough Tragedy Historical Landmark
- Location: 36°23′21″N 119°42′31″W; 5.6 miles (9 km) northwest of Hanford, California
- Date: May 11, 1880
- Deaths: 7
- Motive: Dispute over land titles

California Historical Landmark
- Designated: 1936
- Reference no.: 245

The Mussel Slough Tragedy was a shootout over disputed land titles between settlers and the Southern Pacific Railroad (SP). It took place on May 11, 1880, on a farm located 5.6 miles (9 km) northwest of Hanford, California, in the central San Joaquin Valley. Seven people were killed. The episode became a major theme in many protests and publications denouncing the railroads as villains in California history.

The exact history of the incident has been the source of some disagreement, largely because popular anti-railroad sentiment in the 1880s interpreted the incident as a clear example of corrupt and cold-blooded corporate greed. Muckraking journalists and anti-railroad activists glorified the settlers and used the events as evidence and justification for their anti-corporate crusades. Frank Norris' 1901 novel The Octopus: A Story of California was inspired by this incident, as was W. C. Morrow's 1882 novel Blood-Money. May Merrill Miller's novel First the Blade includes a fictionalized account of the conflict.

The site of the episode is now registered as California Historical Landmark #245. A historical marker on the east side of 14th Avenue, 350 yards (320 m) north of Elder Avenue, memorializes the site.

== Background ==
The region known in the late 19th century as the Mussel Slough country was mostly in what was then Tulare County, California, with a small portion in what was then Fresno County (later the entire area became part of Kings County after the latter was formed in 1893). The Mussel Slough country took its name from a slough which went from the Kings River to Tulare Lake. This area had remained unsettled as it was a broad, dry plain suitable only for cattle ranching, but could be easily irrigated from the slough. The Southern Pacific Railroad (SP) had originally planned to build its route between San Jose and Southern California along the coast, but in 1866 Congress authorized the railroad companies to build a line through the area, and created numbered lots of one square mile (2.6 km^{2}; 640 acres) each. The SP then decided to reroute. It received the odd-numbered sections of land, totaling about 25,000 acres (101 km^{2}) worth. The even-numbered sections were given to homesteaders by the government and were not subject to the events which followed. Given the SP's history of encouraging settlement and development along its lines, land prices were expected to appreciate considerably. Furthermore, the SP's standard practice was to allow settlers to move in on its land as long as they agreed to purchase it when the time came.

Lobbying by land speculators led Secretary of the Interior Orville Hickman Browning to reject the SP's route change, stating that it violated the company's original charter. However, despite his stated intentions to do so, Browning did not actually have the authority to revoke the SP's rights to the land (only Congress could do that). Meanwhile, settlers had already begun submitting applications for the railroad lands starting in 1869, in anticipation of the completion of the line. Others without claims began squatting in anticipation that the SP's title would be invalidated. Primary among this latter group was John J. Doyle, who advertised this and caused a land run in the Hanford area. After the railroad was purchased by the "Big Four" in 1868, the new owners were able by 1870 to have their altered route and land rights reconfirmed.

Regardless, the squatting continued up through the early 1880s. The types of squatters varied wildly. There were Civil War refugees from the American South, owners of even-numbered lots who either sold their legitimate claims or were attempting to expand their holdings, merchants who lived in nearby towns, and land speculators. Doyle started a new business to help squatters challenge the SP for titles to the land, but because the SP's rights were never revoked, all of the settlers' claims were denied. Doyle and other leaders appealed to Congress and the California State Legislature, but were still rebuffed. The SP did not take any legal action against the squatters at this time, hoping to convert them into customers. It encouraged them to file applications so that they would be given the first option to purchase when sales began, but squatter leaders argued that doing so would affirm the company's rights, which they still believed to be invalid. Some submitted the applications, but most did not.

In 1872, the Central Pacific Railroad completed work to Goshen from the north and the Southern Pacific was to construct the southern portion (although not generally known by the public at the time, the two railroad systems were owned and operated by the same people although they were technically separate corporations). The SP's brochures had stated the price of the land would be "$2.50 per acre and upwards", leading many people to mistakenly believe that $2.50/acre was a set price. Furthermore, other brochures indicated that any improvements the settlers made to the land would not be counted when the prices were fixed. However, when the settlers, who had spent a great deal of money and time in building their houses and farms, attempted to acquire their land, the asking price was significantly greater than that ($8–$20/acre), which the SP attributed to rising property values because of the laying of the railroad, although many settlers believed it was due to their own improvements such as irrigation, housing, fences, and barns. Some paid for their land, but most did not. Settlers protested against the railroads, but to no avail. A bill in the United States Congress that would have fixed the price at $2.50/acre failed to pass. The Southern Pacific then filed and won a lawsuit in 1878 against the settlers, amidst allegations of court bias (former California Governor Leland Stanford was also president of SP).

The SP was convinced of its legal ownership of the land and felt it should have the freedom to set whatever prices it deemed fit for its property. The U.S. Supreme Court finally settled the issue in Schulenberg v. Harriman 21 Wall. 44 (1874), ruling that the SP's change of route did not invalidate its charter. Thus, the SP was justified to reclaim the land without compensation unless the settlers were willing to pay their asking price, now up to $35/acre. Still, the Settler's League, which was formed in 1878 in opposition to the SP's Mussel Slough actions, even attempted to appeal directly to President Rutherford B. Hayes during his visit to San Francisco in 1880, presenting him a petition which read,

Through sheer energy and perseverance by the investment of our means ... and relying firmly upon the rights we had acquired as American citizens, and upon the pledges of the Southern Pacific Railroad Company [in regard to low land prices], we converted a desert into one of the garden spots of the State.

Besides the 1874 Supreme Court ruling, a critical moment came on December 15, 1879, when Judge Lorenzo Sawyer of the Ninth Circuit Court of Appeals ruled in Orton, 32 F. 457 (C.C.D. Cal. 1879), that the federal government controlled the railroad land grants, and more importantly, the state could not control ultra vires acts of corporations.

Given the legal system's affirmation of its position, the SP began to forcibly remove some of the settlers. Their agents would attempt to serve eviction notices, but often would not find anyone at home, as homeowners knew they were coming. In these cases, the agents then tried removing the furniture from the homes, but the Settler's League would just put the furniture back after the agents' departure. Finally, it escalated to the point at which the agents would then disassemble the houses, but again, volunteers would just put them back together. The settlers were not above their own brand of justice, either. The League harassed and threatened railroad agents and their sympathizers as well as those who had purchased land from the SP, and in one case one farmer who had aligned with the SP had his house burned down. Those supporting the railroads tended to be wealthier than the others, deriding the Settler's League as "a set of demagogues" who were "very anxious to get something for nothing." By late 1879, the SP found that sales of its parcels had been severely reduced, despite having lowered the asking prices.

Although the settlers received the benefit of a section of public opinion, politically and legally every decision was going the way of the railroad. In March 1880, Stanford himself attempted a reconciliation by appearing in Hanford and meeting with the Settler's League in an attempt to find some sort of compromise, but this fell through as the settlers had demanded a 50% reduction in prices, which the SP refused to do.

== Event ==
On May 11, 1880, a picnic was being held in Hanford which was to feature a speech by pro-settler former California Supreme Court Justice David S. Terry (who was actually unable to appear), when word reached the picnickers that four "railroad men" – U.S. Marshal Alonso Poole, SP land appraiser William Clark, and two locals, Walter J. Crow and Mills Hartt – were actively evicting settlers on railroad lands, and a group of about twenty people, led by settlers James N. Patterson and William Braden, left to confront them (the historical marker indicates that the two local men were Deputy U.S. Marshals, which was not in fact the case). However, the rumors were only partially true; in addition to serving eviction notices, the group was also purchasing land (and any improvements) from settlers who had refused to pay SP's asking price. This act was seen as a betrayal of Stanford's visit a mere two months earlier.

The parties met at the homestead of Henry D. Brewer three miles (4.8 km) north of Grangeville (which is near Hanford), the marshal's group having just been at Braden's house. Later testimony from uninvolved parties indicated that the party of settlers were lightly armed and had every intention of persuading the railroad party to delay their actions until a pending court case could be resolved. However, there was bad blood between Walter J. Crow and one of the settler's party, James Harris, and Mills Hartt had previously threatened to kill any "sandlappers" (a derisive term for homesteaders, equivalent to the modern day "redneck"), and an argument broke out between them. Hartt opened fire at Harris, who returned fire and fatally wounded Hartt. Crow, a skilled marksman who was armed with a shotgun, jumped down from his wagon and opened fire, killing Harris and four other members of the settler's party. After the initial exchange of gunfire ended, Crow fled the scene, but was shot in the back about 1.5 mi (2.4 km) away by an unknown assailant before he could reach safety. Poole and Clark did not participate in the battle and left immediately after the incident, possibly defusing tensions enough to avoid further bloodshed.

=== List of involved persons ===
==== Marshal's group ====
- Alonzo W. Poole, U.S. Marshal
- William H. Clark, railroad land grader
- Walter J. Crow, settler (killed)
- Mills Hartt, settler (killed)

==== Settlers' group ====
- James N. Patterson, leader of the group
- William Braden
- B. S. Burr
- James Harris (killed)
- Edwin Haymaker (died of pneumonia soon after and was considered a victim of the fight)
- John E. Henderson (killed)
- Daniel Kelly (killed)
- Iver Knutson (killed)
- Archibald McGregor (killed)
- W. L. Morton
- Wayman L. Pryor
- John D. Pursell

== Aftermath ==
One of the survivors of the gunfight, settler Edwin Haymaker, died soon after of pneumonia, having apparently been weakened by wounds received in the shootout. Afterwards, seventeen people were indicted by a federal grand jury and five were found guilty of willfully interfering with a marshal in performance of his duties (Braden, Patterson, Pryor, Purcell, and John J. Doyle, a leader in the Settler's League). They were convicted in federal court (with Judge Sawyer presiding) and sentenced to eight months in prison and fined $300 each. Their time spent in imprisonment was hardly difficult. Three of the men's wives were allowed to live with them, and Susan Curtis, daughter of one of the jailers, fell in love with and later married Braden. Upon their release in September 1881, they were greeted by a joyous crowd of 3,000 in Hanford. Such was the anti-railroad sentiment that the five were looked upon as heroes by many across California, and those killed were considered martyrs who had given their lives for a cause.

Nevertheless, the affair brought such a shock that people were sobered. The legal battle had been lost, the railroad had won, and there was not enough public support for changing the policy of granting public lands to railroads. The only concession SP made was to reduce the land price slightly. In the end, most people (including Doyle, who later reconciled and became good friends with Collis Potter Huntington, one of the SP's leaders) simply stayed where they were and purchased the land. Squatting continued for years, though, despite the SP's best attempts to squash it.

== The Mussel Slough myth ==
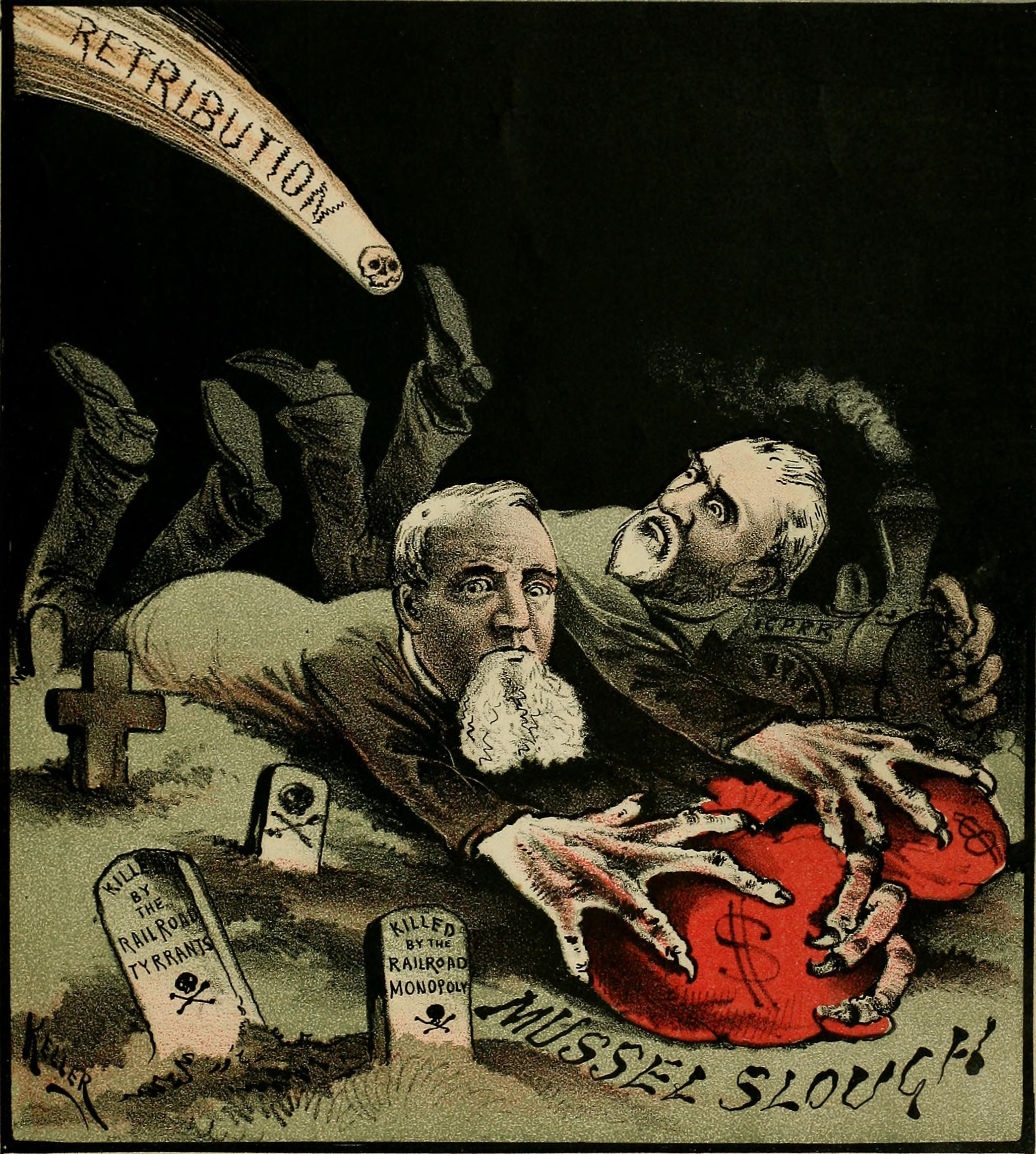
"The Retribution Comet" – Editorial cartoon published in The Wasp, July 8, 1881, depicting a comet with a skull about to strike railroad tycoons Leland Stanford and Collis Potter Huntington, shown robbing the graves of the Mussel Slough victims

The Mussel Slough affair was seized upon by newspaper editors as well as a number of popular writers soon after the tragic shootout, as an example of corporate greed and the abuses of freewheeling market capitalism around the start of the 20th century. Muckraking novels such as W. C. Morrow's Blood-Money (1882) and Charles Cyril Post's Driven from Sea to Sea; or, Just A' Campin' (1884) exaggerate the fault of the railroad for the events as they unfolded in San Joaquin and romanticize the ranchers according to a Jeffersonian agrarian ideal. Ambrose Bierce attempted to lionize Crow, calling him "this bravest of Americans."

Later novels depicting the affair, such as the philosopher Josiah Royce's The Feud of Oakfield Creek (1887) and novelist Frank Norris' The Octopus (1901) are slightly less hagiographic in their portrayals of the Mussel Slough ranchers, but nevertheless give a fairly one-sided, anti-railroad view of the Mussel Slough affair. Richard Orsi's suggests in his history of the Southern Pacific, Sunset Limited that some common misconceptions about the Mussel Slough affair have been perpetuated through the mythic retellings of Morrow, Post, Royce, and Norris, among others.

The significance of the Mussel Slough myth in the history of California and the Southern Pacific Railroad is evident from a quote by Theodore Roosevelt, who as president focused considerable time and energy in redressing the wrongs and abuses of corporate monopolies throughout the U.S. After reading Norris' The Octopus, Roosevelt stated he was "inclined to think [...] that conditions were worse in California than elsewhere." These mythic narratives about Mussel Slough helped bolster public anti-railroad sentiments, and encouraged continued rebellion among homesteaders, squatters and poachers against railroad land agents, who "came to accept squatters as an ordinary, if disagreeable, part of the land business".

Despite the nationwide attention the incident received, the Mussel Slough Tragedy is not remembered much today as well as later gunfights such as the gunfight at the O.K. Corral. Richard Maxwell Brown argues in No Duty to Retreat that the Mussel Slough shootout did not fit the mold of the gunfight/hero myth, which usually ignores such factors as ideology, and social and economic conflict, thus not implanting it in the lore of the American Old West.

== Tragedy Oak ==
Six victims of the shooting were carried to the porch of the Brewer house, which was shaded by a tall oak tree. The tree became famously known as the Tragedy Oak. It blew down in a storm in the early 1990s. A piece of the tree was saved as a memorial and is on display at nearby Pioneer Elementary School in Hanford.

== See also ==
- History of rail transportation in California
