= David Ausberry =

American football player (born 1987)

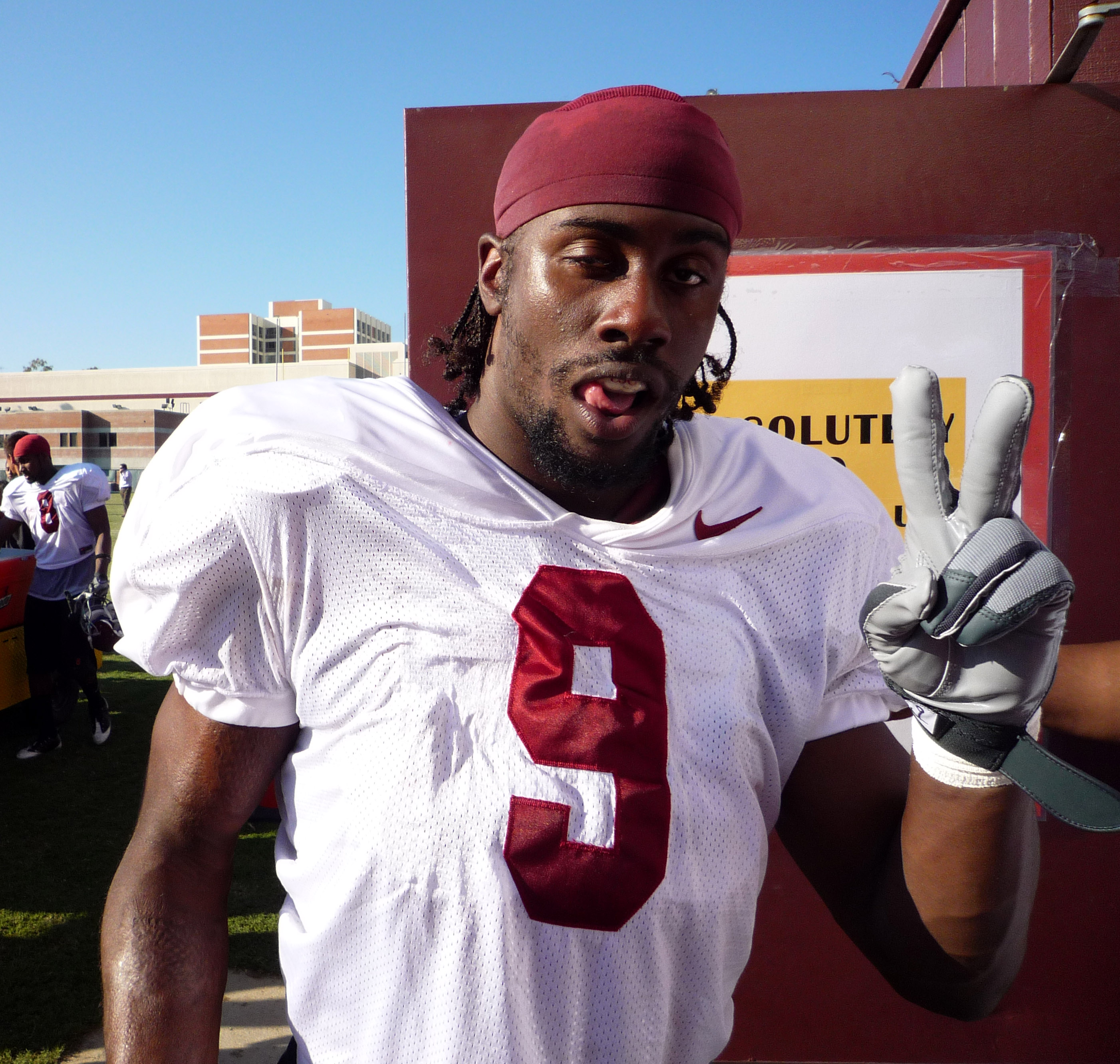
- Ausberry making the USC "V" for victory sign after a 2008 fall practice.

No. 86
- Position: Tight end

Personal information
- Born: September 25, 1987 (age 39); Strasburg, Virginia, U.S.
- Listed height: 6 ft 4 in (1.93 m)
- Listed weight: 250 lb (113 kg)

Career information
- High school: Lemoore (CA)
- College: USC
- NFL draft: 2011: 7th round, 241st overall pick

Career history
- Oakland Raiders (2011–2014); Detroit Lions (2015)*
- * Offseason or practice squad member only

Career NFL statistics
- Receptions: 11
- Receiving yards: 120
- Stats at Pro Football Reference

David Ausberry (born September 25, 1987) is an American former professional football player who was a tight end in the National Football League (NFL). He played college football for the University of Southern California and was selected by the Oakland Raiders in the 2011 NFL draft.

== Early life ==
Ausberry was considered one of the top wide receiver prospects in the country at Lemoore High School. His senior year, he caught 55 passes for 930 yards and 13 touchdowns. He was later invited to play in the 2006 U.S. Army All-American Bowl.

== College career ==
Ausberry played college football at Southern California. After redshirting in 2006 Ausberry would go on to be a productive member of the Trojan team for the next 4 years. In that time he logged 64 receptions for 700 yards as well as 7 touchdowns. He also rushed for 14 yards on two attempts in 2010. At 6'4, 243 lbs., Ausberry ran an impressive 4.48 40-yard dash at the NFL Combine.

== Professional career ==
Pre-draft measurables
Height	Weight	Arm length	Hand span	40-yard dash	10-yard split	20-yard split	20-yard shuttle	Three-cone drill	Vertical jump	Broad jump	Bench press
6 ft 3 1/2 in (1.92 m)	243 lb (110 kg)	32 1/2 in (0.83 m)	10 3/4 in (0.27 m)	4.48 s	1.62 s	2.64 s	4.43 s	7.08 s	36.0 in (0.91 m)	10 ft 1 in (3.07 m)	23 reps
All values from Pro Day

=== Oakland Raiders ===
Ausberry was selected by the Oakland Raiders in the seventh round with the 241st overall pick in the 2011 NFL draft and converted to tight end. He played sparingly during his rookie year, and finished the 2011 season with two catches, while excelling on special teams with seven coverage tackles in twelve games.

=== Detroit Lions ===
Ausberry signed with the Detroit Lions on June 10, 2015. He was released by the team on August 18, 2015.

=== Career statistics ===
Year	Team	Games	Receptions	Targets	Receiving Yards	Yards per Reception	Longest Reception	Receiving Touchdowns	First Downs	Fumbles	Fumbles Lost
2011	OAK	12	2	2	14	7.0	10	0	2	0	0
2012	OAK	16	7	12	92	13.1	31	0	5	0	0
2014	OAK	6	2	4	14	7.0	7	0	5	0	0
Total	Total	34	11	18	120	10.9	31	0	12	0	0
