= Daniel Rhoads =

California settler

Daniel Rhoads (December 7, 1821, Paris, Illinois – December 4, 1895, San Francisco) was an American pioneer and rancher who helped rescue the Donner Party.

He was born in Edgar County, Illinois, and was of English heritage. His grandfather, also named Daniel, served under George Washington in the American Revolutionary War. Rhoads became interested in an account of General John C. Frémont's first trip to California, and decided to go to the West Coast. In 1846, he and his wife Amanda Esrey and other family members made the 5-month journey across the country, arriving in Wheatland, California, on October 4, where they stayed for about a month before settling near Sutter's Fort in the Sacramento Valley. During their trek west, they encountered the Donner Party, who invited Rhoads and others to join their group to take a new route that was supposedly shorter. Preferring not to use an unproven trail, Rhoads declined the offer.

That winter, word of the Donner Party's plight reached the Sacramento area and Rhoads was a member of the first group of rescuers. They had to carry supplies and provisions on foot for 80 miles (129 km) through the snow, but were able to find some survivors on February 18, 1847, who greeted them with the question, "Are you men from California or do you come from heaven?" At that time, those people had not eaten for about three weeks. Rhoads and his team led twenty-one people, mostly women and children, out of the Sierra Nevada, but three died along the return trip. The rescuers had left caches of food for use on the way back, but one of them had been eaten by animals, and they had to consume rawhide from their snowshoes for three days until they returned to their base camp.

When gold was discovered at Sutter's Mill, launching the California Gold Rush, Rhoads was working at a nearby ranch. Over the next few years, he mined the American River, making about $8,000 in gold. Rhoads and his family returned to Missouri in 1851, but he was not content and returned to California to purchase a ranch outside of Gilroy, California. During a drought in 1857, he took his livestock to the Kings River. His family joined him in 1860, moving into an adobe he constructed on 2,000 acres (810 ha) of land in Kingston. El Adobe de los Robles Rancho ("the adobe of the oaks ranch"), which is still standing, is the second oldest adobe in the San Joaquin Valley and has been continuously occupied since its construction. It is registered as California Historical Landmark #206.

During his time in Lemoore, he became involved with local banks, serving as the vice-president of the Bank of Hanford as well as the president of the Bank of Lemoore. He enjoyed banking so much that he eventually moved to San Francisco, serving as one of the directors of the Grangers' Bank of San Francisco. He died in San Francisco, and is buried in Lemoore.
