= Lemoore Union Elementary School District =

School district in California

Address
- 1200 West Cinnamon Drive Lemoore, California, 93245; United States

District information
- Type: Public
- Grades: K–8
- NCES District ID: 0621360

Students and staff
- Students: 3,227 (2020–2021)
- Teachers: 155.81 (FTE)
- Staff: 152.18 (FTE)
- Student–teacher ratio: 20.71:1

Other information
- Website: www.luesd.k12.ca.us

Lemoore Union Elementary School District is a school district in Lemoore, California.

== Schools ==
=== Cinnamon Elementary School ===
Cinnamon Elementary is headed by Principal Sarah Streib and Learning Coordinator Rebecca Garnica. Cinnamon opened in August 2001. It is located in eastern Lemoore. Cinnamon Elementary was built to ease congestion in the existing Elementaries and to create a neighborhood school for the growing East side of the city. Cinnamon currently serves approximately 600 kindergarten to sixth grade students. Cinnamon has a faculty of approximately 30 full and part-time teachers.

=== Freedom Elementary ===
Freedom Elementary is headed by Principal Tracy Cassina and Learning Coordinator Stephanie Tischmacher. Freedom Elementary is the newest school in the district, opening in 2021.

=== Lemoore Elementary School ===
Lemoore Elementary is headed by Principal Amy Garcia and Learning Coordinator. Lemoore Elementary is the oldest school in the district and has three distinct permanent buildings and play areas. They are traditionally called the Washington, Lincoln, and Jefferson Buildings. Lemoore Elementary is located in south-central Lemoore, on a 17-acre (69,000 m^{2}) lot and was originally the only school in the city. Lemoore Elementary currently serves approximately 650 kindergarten to sixth grade students. Lemoore Elementary has a faculty of approximately 33 full and part-time teachers.

=== Meadow Lane Elementary ===
Meadow Lane Elementary is headed by Principal Rhett Kenney and Learning Coordinator. Meadow Lane Elementary is located at the intersection of Quandt & Meadow Lanes in north-eastern Lemoore. Meadow Lane was opened to ease over crowding in Lemoore Elementary and create a neighborhood school for children in the Northern areas of the city. Meadow Lane currently serves approximately 650 kindergarten to sixth grade students. Meadow Lane has a faculty of approximately 32 full and part-time teachers.

=== P.W. Engvall Elementary School ===
Engvall Elementary is headed by Principal Renea Fagundes and Learning Coordinator Jenna Brown. Engvall is located in southwest Lemoore. P.W. Engvall was originally a Middle School/Junior High and served in that capacity until the 1994-95 school year when it was converted into an Elementary when the district opened a new middle school. The school has since undergone renovation with the removal of outdoor education sites, modification of recreation areas, and the addition of several classrooms, as well as the removal of the memorial to the beloved long time teacher Jim Ross. Engvall currently serves approximately 640 kindergarten to sixth grade students. Engvall Elementary has a faculty of approximately 32 full and part-time teachers.

=== University Charter School ===
University Charter School (UCS) is a located on the back of the West Hills College Lemoore campus. The school opened in 2003 shortly after West Hills College Lemoore opened.

=== Liberty Middle School ===
District Middle School

=== Bridges Academy ===
Alternative Education
