= Kings County, California =

County in California, United States

Kings County
- County
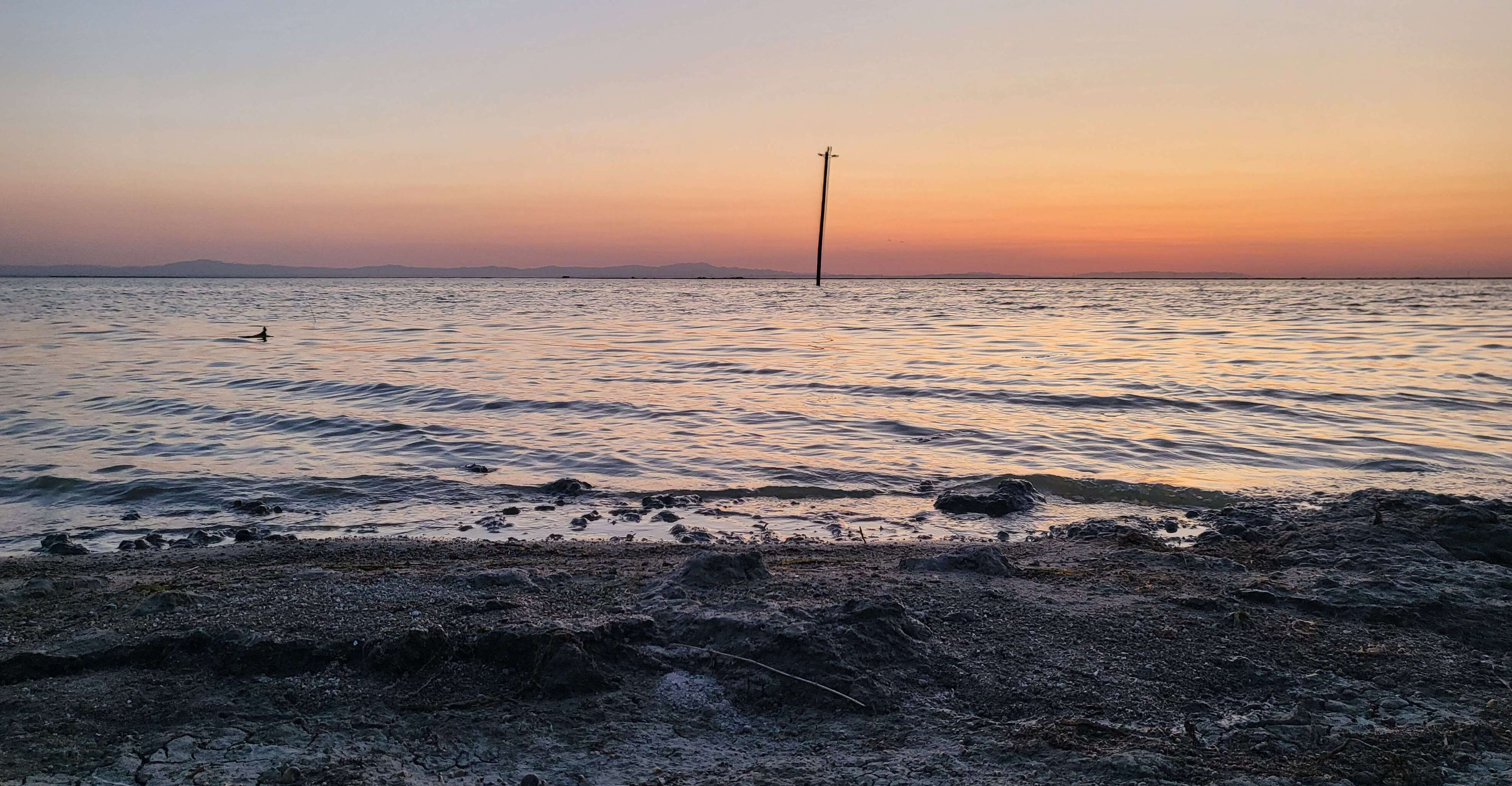
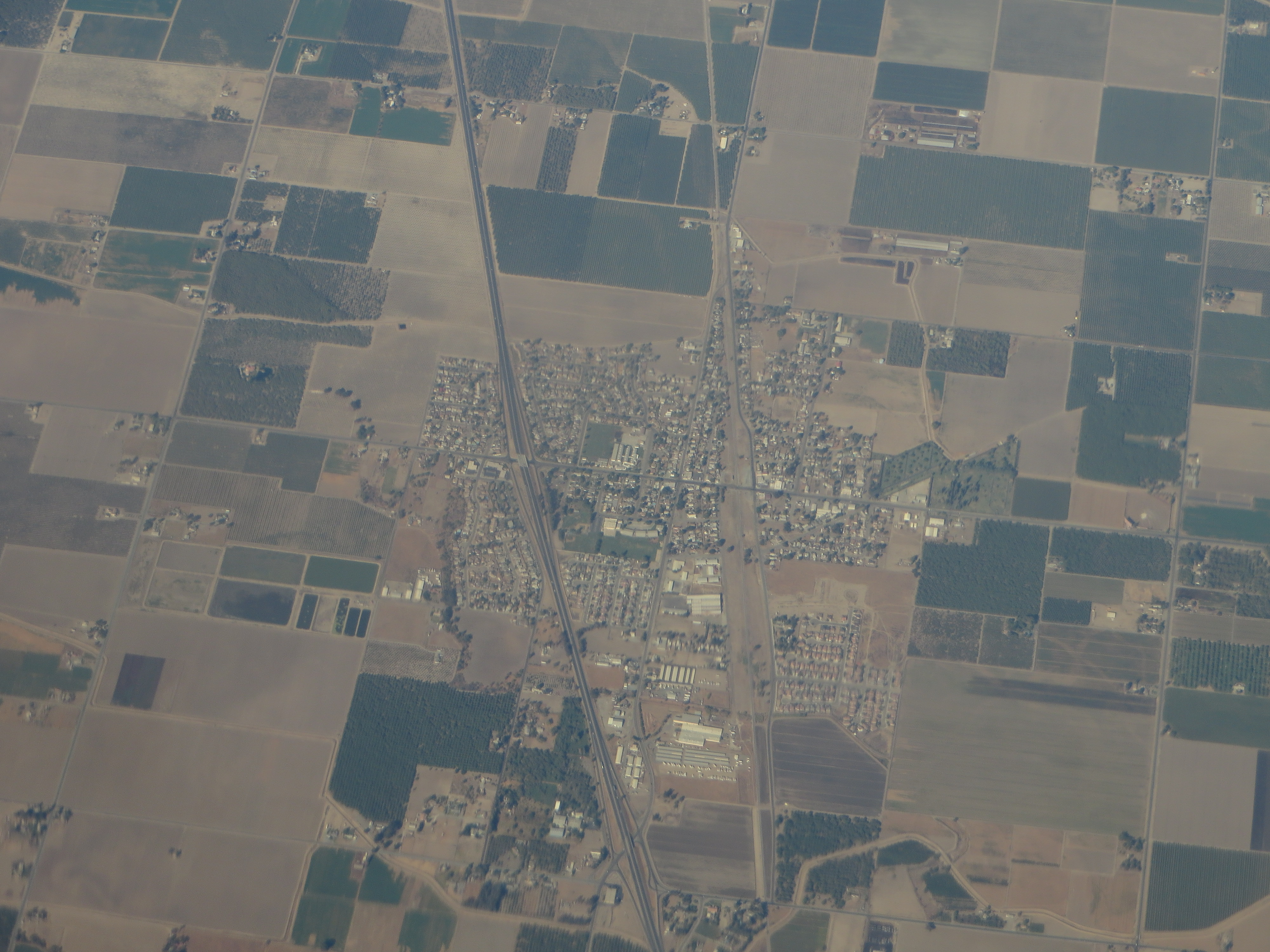
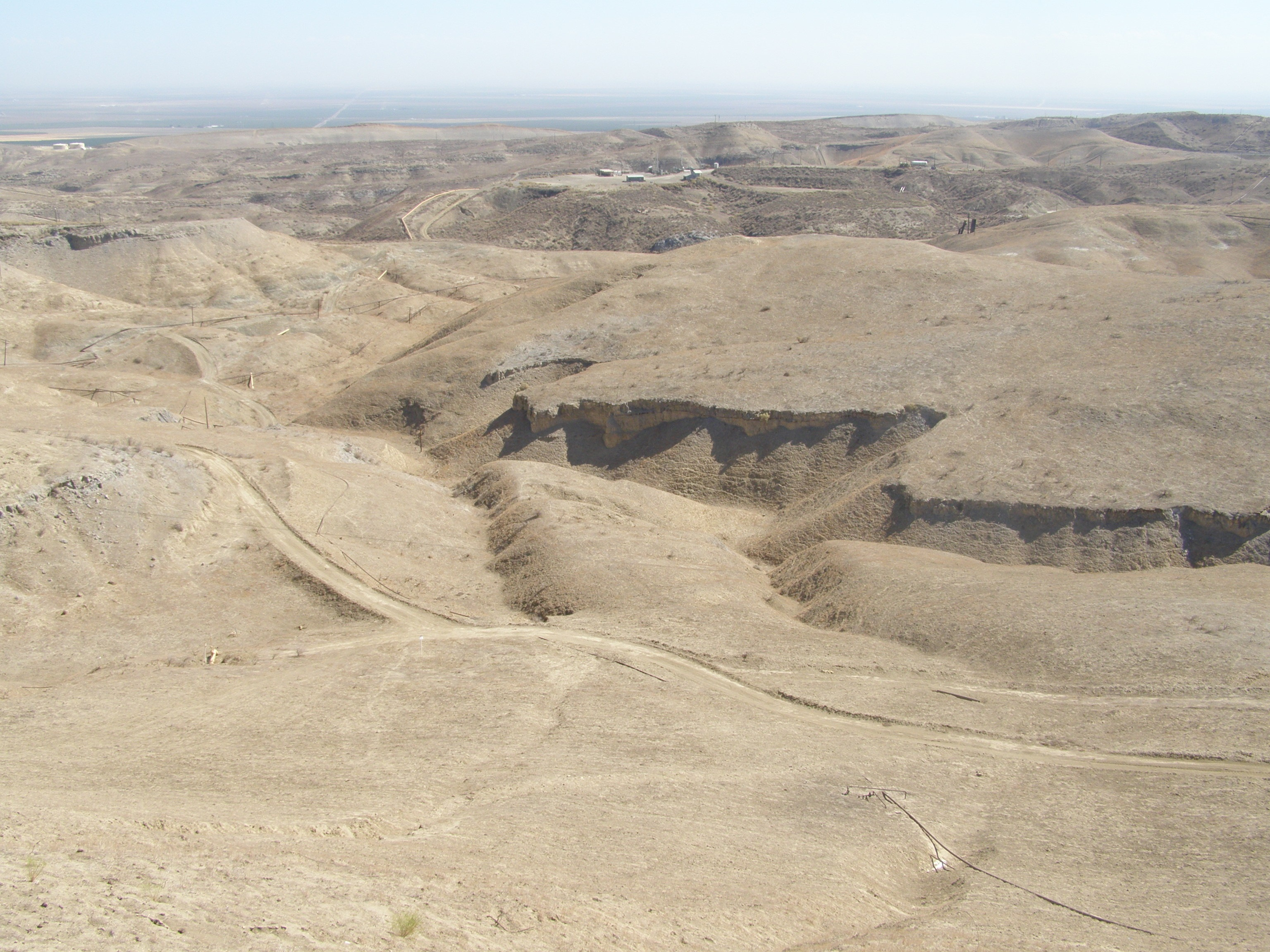
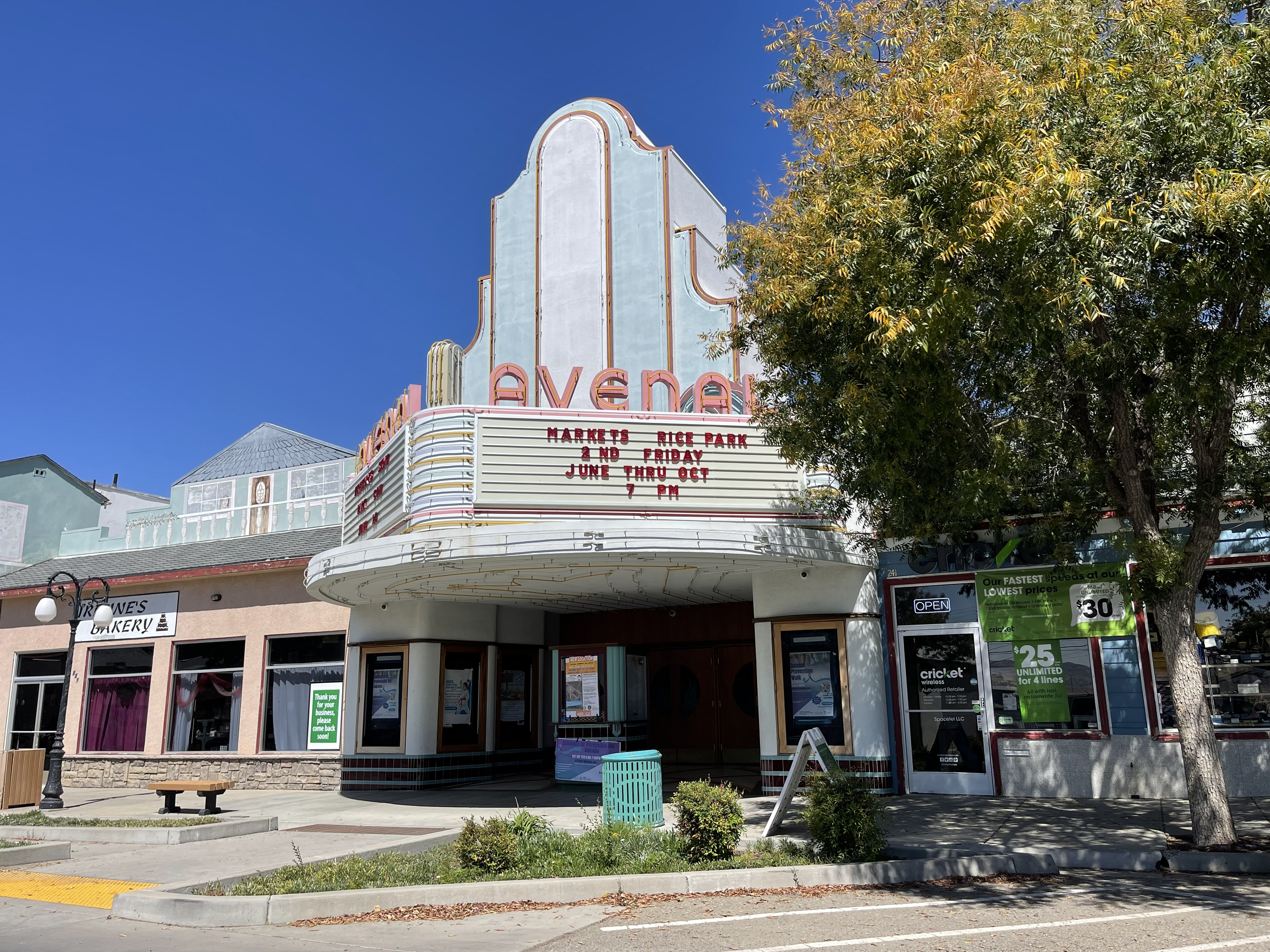
- Tulare Lake Hanford Armona Kettleman Hills Avenal

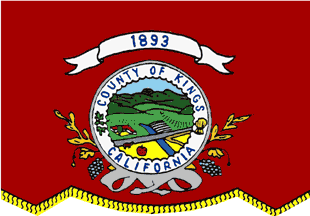
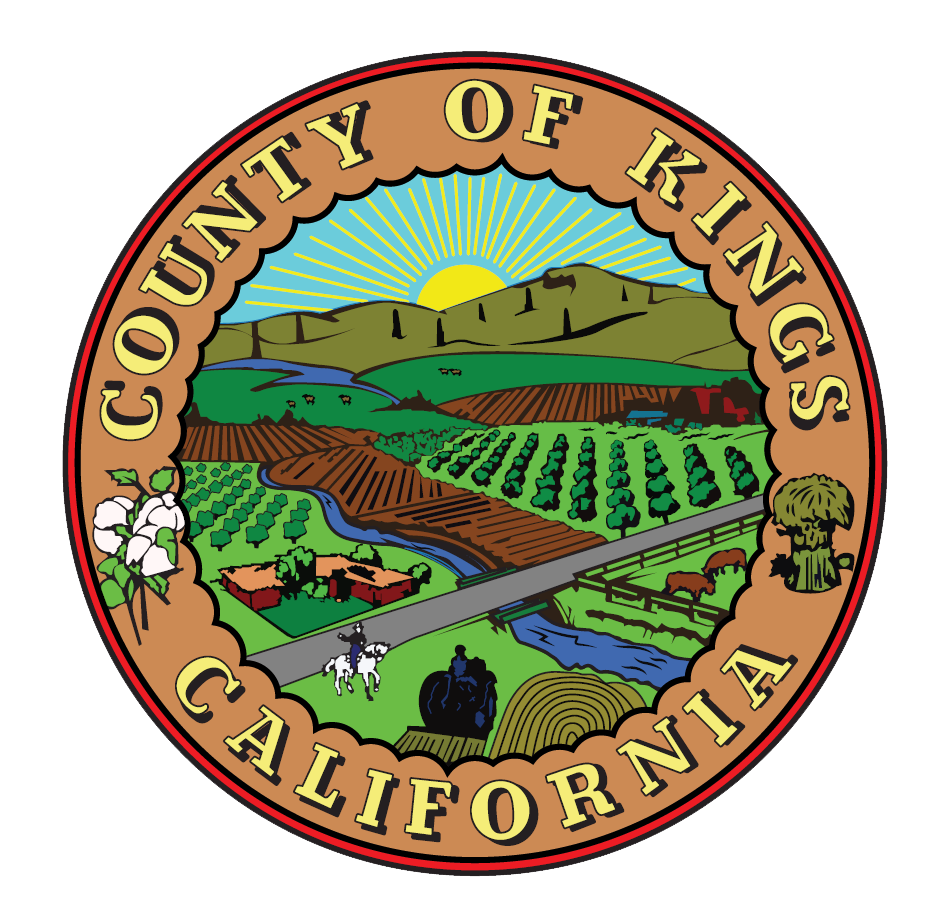
- Flag Seal
- Interactive map of Kings County
- Location in the state of California
- Coordinates: 36.07°N 119.81°W
- Country: United States
- State: California
- Region: San Joaquin Valley
- Established: March 22, 1893
- Named for: Kings River
- County seat: Hanford
- Largest city: Hanford (population); Avenal (area)
- Incorporated cities: 4

Government
  - Type: Council–CAO
  - Body: Board of Supervisors
  - Chair: Joe Neves
  - Vice Chair: Rusty Robinson
  - Board of Supervisors: Supervisors: Joe Neves; Richard Valle; Doug Verboon; Rusty Robinson; Robert Thayer
  - County Administrative Officer: Kyria Martinez

Area
  - Total: 1,392 sq mi (3,610 km^{2})
  - Land: 1,389 sq mi (3,600 km^{2})
  - Water: 2.1 sq mi (5.4 km^{2})
- Highest elevation: 3,476 ft (1,059 m)

Population (2020)
  - Total: 152,486
  - Estimate (2025): 154,327 ▲
  - Density: 109.8/sq mi (42.39/km^{2})

GDP
  - Total: $8.146 billion (2022)
- Time zone: UTC−8 (Pacific Time Zone)
  - Summer (DST): UTC−7 (Pacific Daylight Time)
- Area code: 559
- FIPS code: 06-031
- GNIS feature ID: 277280
- Congressional districts: 20th, 22nd
- Website: www.countyofkingsca.gov

Kings County is a county located in the U.S. state of California. The population was 152,486 at the 2020 census. The county seat is Hanford.

Kings County comprises the Hanford-Corcoran, CA metropolitan statistical area, which is also included in the Visalia-Porterville-Hanford, CA combined statistical area. It is in the San Joaquin Valley, a rich agricultural region.

== History ==
The area was inhabited for thousands of years by Native Americans including the Tachi Yokuts tribe. They continue to live in the area on the Santa Rosa Rancheria. It was colonized by Spain, Mexico and the United States.

An 1805 expedition probably led by Spanish Army Lieutenant Gabriel Moraga recorded discovering the river, which they named El Rio de los Santos Reyes (River of the Holy Kings) after the Three Wise Men of the Bible. At the time of the United States conquest of California in 1848, the new government changed the name to Kings River after which the county was named.

In 1880, a dispute over land titles between settlers and the Southern Pacific Railroad resulted in a bloody gun battle on a farm 5.6 mi (9.0 km) northwest of Hanford; seven men died. This event became known as the Mussel Slough Tragedy.

Kings County was formed in 1893 from the western part of Tulare County. In 1909, by an act of the state legislature, 208 square miles (540 km^{2}) of Fresno County territory was added to the northwest portion of Kings County.

Settlers reclaimed Tulare Lake and its wetlands for agricultural development. In surface area, it was formerly the largest body of freshwater west of the Great Lakes, and supported a large population of migratory birds as well as local birds and wildlife. Monoculture has sharply reduced habitat for many species.

In 1928, oil was discovered in the Kettleman Hills located in the southwestern part of Kings County. The Kettleman North Dome Oil Field became one of the most productive oil fields in the United States.

During the Great Depression, over 18,000 cotton pickers in the southern San Joaquin Valley, mostly migrant Mexican workers, went on strike in the California agricultural strikes of 1933. During the strike, 3,500 striking farm workers lived in a four-acre camp on the land of a small farmer on the outskirts of Corcoran. Ultimately, the federal government intervened to force both sides to negotiate a settlement.

Lemoore Army Airfield was established for training and defense during World War II. In 1961, the U.S. Navy opened NAS Lemoore 9 miles (14 km) west of Lemoore, not far from the earlier site.

The completion of the California Aqueduct in the early 1970s brought needed water for agriculture and domestic use to the west side of the county.

== Historic sites ==
- Kingston
- Mussel Slough Tragedy
- El Adobe de los Robles Rancho built by Daniel Rhoads
- Vaca Adobe
- Cox & Clark Trading Post and Steamboat Landing
- Witt Site

== Geography ==
According to the U.S. Census Bureau, the county has a total area of 1,392 square miles (3,610 km^{2}), of which 1,389 square miles (3,600 km^{2}) is land and 2.1 square miles (5.4 km^{2}) (0.2%) is water.

Kings County is bordered on the north and northwest by Fresno County, on the east by Tulare County, on the south by Kern County and a small part of San Luis Obispo County and on the west by Monterey County.

Table Mountain is the highest point in Kings County at an elevation of 3,476 feet (1,059 m). It is located in the Diablo Range in southwestern Kings County on the boundary between Kings and Monterey counties. Tent Hills is a ridge in Kings County.

Most of the historic Tulare Lake was within Kings County. Although reclaimed for farming late in the 19th century, it was the largest freshwater lake west of the Great Lakes.

== Demographics ==
Historical population
Census	Pop.	Note	%±
1900	9,871		—
1910	16,230		64.4%
1920	22,031		35.7%
1930	25,385		15.2%
1940	35,168		38.5%
1950	46,768		33.0%
1960	49,954		6.8%
1970	64,610		29.3%
1980	73,738		14.1%
1990	101,469		37.6%
2000	129,461		27.6%
2010	152,982		18.2%
2020	152,486		−0.3%
2025 (est.)	154,327	▲	1.2%
U.S. Decennial Census; 1790–1960 1900–1990; 1990–2000 2010 2020

=== 2020 census ===
As of the 2020 census, the county had a population of 152,486. The median age was 32.9 years, with 26.6% of residents under the age of 18 and 10.6% aged 65 or older. For every 100 females there were 118.1 males, and for every 100 females age 18 and over there were 124.0 males age 18 and over.

The racial makeup of the county was 40.2% White, 5.9% Black or African American, 2.4% American Indian and Alaska Native, 3.9% Asian, 0.3% Native Hawaiian and Pacific Islander, 31.5% from some other race, and 15.9% from two or more races. Hispanic or Latino residents of any race comprised 56.8% of the population.

89.1% of residents lived in urban areas, while 10.9% lived in rural areas.

There were 44,100 households in the county, of which 44.4% had children under the age of 18 living with them and 24.9% had a female householder with no spouse or partner present. About 18.7% of all households were made up of individuals and 7.5% had someone living alone who was 65 years of age or older.

There were 46,287 housing units, of which 4.7% were vacant. Among occupied housing units, 54.1% were owner-occupied and 45.9% were renter-occupied. The homeowner vacancy rate was 1.1% and the rental vacancy rate was 3.9%.

=== Racial and ethnic composition ===
Kings County, California – Racial and ethnic composition Note: the US Census treats Hispanic/Latino as an ethnic category. This table excludes Latinos from the racial categories and assigns them to a separate category. Hispanics/Latinos may be of any race.
Race / Ethnicity (NH = Non-Hispanic)	Pop 1980	Pop 1990	Pop 2000	Pop 2010	Pop 2020	% 1980	% 1990	% 2000	% 2010	% 2020
White alone (NH)	47,211	54,426	53,817	53,879	44,361	64.03%	53.64%	41.57%	35.22%	29.09%
Black or African American alone (NH)	3,504	7,747	10,418	10,314	8,300	4.75%	7.63%	8.05%	6.74%	5.44%
Native American or Alaska Native alone (NH)	725	905	1,304	1,297	1,690	0.98%	0.89%	1.01%	0.85%	1.11%
Asian alone (NH)	2,189	3,408	3,884	5,339	5,511	2.97%	3.36%	3.00%	3.49%	3.61%
Native Hawaiian or Pacific Islander alone (NH)	x	x	192	228	331	0.15%	0.15%	0.15%	0.15%	0.22%
Other race alone (NH)	282	432	229	803	713	0.38%	0.43%	0.18%	0.52%	0.47%
Mixed race or Multiracial (NH)	x	x	3,156	3,256	4,973	x	x	2.44%	2.13%	3.26%
Hispanic or Latino (any race)	19,827	34,551	56,461	77,866	86,607	26.89%	34.05%	43.61%	50.90%	56.80%
Total	73,738	101,469	129,461	152,982	152,486	100.00%	100.00%	100.00%	100.00%	100.00%

=== American Community Survey 2025 data ===
The United States Census Bureau estimated that in 2025, Kings County’s population was 154.327. It was also estimated that the county's population was 26,34% Non-Hispanic White, 60,19% Hispanic or Latino, 5,28% Non-Hispanic Black, 3,91% Asian, 1,06% Native American, 0,25% Pacific Islander, and 2,97% Multiracial.

Total	Population	Percentage
Non-Hispanic White	40.645	26,34%
Hispanic or Latino	92.888	60,19%
Non-Hispanic Black	8.146	5,28%
Asian	6.039	3,91%
Native American	1.640	1,06%
Pacific Islander	383	0,25%
Non-Hispanic Multiracial	4.586	2,97%

=== 2010 census ===
The 2010 United States census reported that Kings County had a population of 152,982. The census included inmates of the three men's state prisons. According to the California Department of Corrections and Rehabilitation, there were 18,640 inmates in Kings County prisons on March 31, 2010, which was 12.2% of the population. The inmate population had been reduced to 13,894 on December 31, 2013. The racial makeup of Kings County was 83,027 (54.3%) White, 11,014 (7.2%) African American, 2,562 (1.7%) Native American, 5,620 (3.7%) Asian, 271 (0.2%) Pacific Islander, 42,996 (28.1%) from other races, and 7,492 (4.9%) from two or more races. Hispanic or Latino of any race were 77,866 persons (50.9%).

The U.S. Census does not identify how many residents are undocumented immigrants. However, the Public Policy Institute of California issued a report in July 2011, which estimated there were 9,000 illegal immigrants living in Kings County in 2008, which would be 5.8% of the county's population.

According to the California Board of State and Community Corrections, Kings County had the highest incarceration rate of California's 58 counties in 2014 at 1,384 per 100,000 population. Statewide, the rate was 567 per 100,000.

Population reported at 2010 United States census
The County	Total Population	White	African American	Native American	Asian	Pacific Islander	other races	two or more races	Hispanic or Latino (of any race)
Kings County	152,982	83,027	11,014	2,562	5,620	271	42,996	7,492	77,866
Incorporated city	Total Population	White	African American	Native American	Asian	Pacific Islander	other races	two or more races	Hispanic or Latino (of any race)
Avenal	15,505	6,044	1,625	186	108	6	7,188	348	11,130
Corcoran	24,813	8,940	3,725	349	193	17	10,979	610	15,545
Hanford	53,967	33,713	2,632	712	2,322	53	11,599	2,936	25,419
Lemoore	24,531	13,925	1,566	333	2,010	102	4,935	1,660	9,820
Census-designated place	Total Population	White	African American	Native American	Asian	Pacific Islander	other races	two or more races	Hispanic or Latino (of any race)
Armona	4,156	2,058	99	64	85	13	1,597	240	2,784
Grangeville	469	393	15	5	5	0	41	10	145
Hardwick	138	63	5	0	0	0	67	3	86
Home Garden	1,761	652	221	63	50	8	677	90	1,189
Kettleman City	1,439	478	4	8	1	0	887	61	1,383
Lemoore Station	7,438	4,883	729	70	560	53	418	725	1,445
Stratford	1,277	574	16	17	19	1	617	33	1,069
Other unincorporated areas	Total Population	White	African American	Native American	Asian	Pacific Islander	other races	two or more races	Hispanic or Latino (of any race)
All others not CDPs (combined)	17,488	11,304	377	755	267	18	3,991	776	7,851

=== 2000 ===
As of the 2000 census, there were 129,461 people, 34,418 households, and 26,983 families residing in the county. However, the California Department of Finance estimates that the population had grown 154,434 as of January 1, 2008. The population density based on the 2000 census was 36/km^{2} (93/sq mi). There were 36,563 housing units at an average density of 26 per square mile (10/km^{2}). The racial makeup of the county was 53.7% White, 8.3% Black or African American, 1.7% Native American, 3.1% Asian, 0.2% Pacific Islander, 28.3% from other races, and 4.8% from two or more races. 43.6% of the population were Hispanic or Latino of any race. 7.1% were of Portuguese, 6.2% German, 5.3% Irish and 5.1% American ancestry according to Census 2000. 63.6% spoke English, 30.9% Spanish, 1.4% Tagalog, 1.4% Portuguese and 1.3% Samoan as their first language.

There were 34,418 households, out of which 46.4% had children under the age of 18 living with them, 58.0% were married couples living together, 14.3% had a female householder with no husband present, and 21.6% were non-families. 17.0% of all households were made up of individuals, and 6.8% had someone living alone who was 65 years of age or older. The average household size was 3.18 and the average family size was 3.56.

In the county, the population was spread out, with 29.0% under the age of 18, 11.8% from 18 to 24, 35.0% from 25 to 44, 16.8% from 45 to 64, and 7.4% who were 65 years of age or older. The median age was 30 years in 2000, which had increased to 31.1 by the time of the 2010 census. For every 100 females there were 134.8 males. For every 100 females age 18 and over, there were 148.8 males. The ratio may be attributed to the presence of three men's state prisons in the county.

== Government and policing ==
=== Administration ===
The government of Kings County operates as a general law county defined and authorized under the California Constitution and law. That is, it does not have a county charter. The county is governed by a five-member Board of Supervisors. Supervisors are elected by districts for four-year terms. There are no term limits in effect. The chairman and vice-chairman are elected annually by the Board of Supervisors from among its members. On January 7, 2020, the Board elected Supervisor Doug Verboon as chairman and Supervisor Craig Pederson as vice-chairman to serve during 2020. Other Supervisors include Richard Valle, Joe Neves and Richard Fagundes. The Board of Supervisors appoints a County Administrative Officer. Rebecca Campbell was appointed to that office effective on January 1, 2018. She succeeded Larry Spikes who held the post from 1993 through 2017.

=== District Attorney ===
The Kings County District Attorney is Sarah Hacker. The District Attorney of each of the 58 counties in California is responsible for prosecuting the violation of California state and local laws and ordinances. The District Attorney is the sole criminal prosecuting entity in the county. In addition to the prosecution duties of the District Attorney, the Kings County District Attorney also has civil and criminal investigative authority with its own Bureau of Investigations composed of sworn peace officers with arresting authority. The Kings County District Attorney's Victim-Witness Assistance Program also provides assistance to victims of crime through federal, state, and local resources.

=== City police departments ===
Within Kings County, there are four city police departments: Hanford (the county seat), Corcoran, Lemoore, and Avenal.

=== Sheriff ===
As of November 2025, the Kings County Sheriff-Coroner-Public Administrator is Dave Putnam. The Kings County Sheriff's Office provides court protection, county jail operation, and coroner services for the entire county. It provides patrol and detective services to the unincorporated areas of the county.

=== State and federal representation ===
In the California State Legislature, Kings County is in the 16th senatorial district, represented by Democrat Melissa Hurtado, and in the 33rd Assembly district, represented by Republican Alexandra Macedo.

In the United States House of Representatives, Kings County is split between California's 20th congressional district, represented by Republican Vince Fong, and California's 22nd congressional district, represented by Republican David Valadao.

== Politics ==
=== Voter registration ===
According to the Kings County Election Office, as of March 24, 2017, 51,323 residents were registered to vote. There were 22,341 voters registered as Republicans, 17,429 registered as Democrats and 9,443 did not state a party preference. The remaining 2,104 registered with minor parties.

Population and registered voters
Total population	152,335	
Registered voters (Note: Percentage of registered voters with respect to total population. Percentages of party members with respect to registered voters follow.)	48,485	31.8%
Democratic	17,336	35.8%
Republican	21,893	45.2%
Democratic–Republican spread	-4,557	-9.4%
Independent	1,236	2.5%
Green	94	0.2%
Libertarian	214	0.4%
Peace and Freedom	86	0.2%
Americans Elect	2	0.0%
Other	161	0.3%
No party preference	7,463	15.4%

==== Cities by population and voter registration ====
Cities by population and voter registration
City	Population	Registered voters	Democratic	Republican	D–R spread	Other	No party preference
Avenal	15,705	10.7%	53.7%	26.7%	+27.0%	5.3%	16.4%
Corcoran	25,113	17.1%	57.4%	26.3%	+31.1%	4.8%	13.4%
Hanford	53,159	41.1%	33.9%	47.0%	-13.1%	6.5%	15.2%
Lemoore	24,217	39.2%	31.9%	46.2%	-14.3%	7.2%	17.8%

=== Overview ===
Kings has long been a strongly Republican county in Presidential elections. The last Democratic candidate for president to win the county was Hubert Humphrey in 1968, and the last to win a majority was Lyndon Johnson in 1964.

United States presidential election results for Kings County, California (Note: This total comprised 1,419 votes for Progressive Theodore Roosevelt (who was official Republican nominee in California), 406 votes for Socialist Eugene V. Debs and 156 votes for Prohibition Party nominee Eugene W. Chafin.)
Year	Republican		Democratic		Third party(ies)	
Year	No.	%	No.	%	No.	%
1896	673	43.06%	862	55.15%	28	1.79%
1900	1,032	51.76%	872	43.73%	90	4.51%
1904	1,110	58.67%	595	31.45%	187	9.88%
1908	1,198	53.22%	859	38.16%	194	8.62%
1912	0	0.00%	1,967	49.82%	1,981	50.18%
1916	2,221	39.65%	2,905	51.86%	476	8.50%
1920	2,806	59.61%	1,604	34.08%	297	6.31%
1924	2,812	50.00%	1,109	19.72%	1,703	30.28%
1928	2,947	51.51%	2,701	47.21%	73	1.28%
1932	2,009	26.72%	5,191	69.05%	318	4.23%
1936	2,226	23.67%	7,062	75.10%	116	1.23%
1940	3,911	31.75%	8,307	67.43%	102	0.83%
1944	3,468	34.22%	6,591	65.04%	75	0.74%
1948	4,289	37.23%	6,909	59.97%	323	2.80%
1952	7,708	49.19%	7,850	50.09%	113	0.72%
1956	6,195	42.28%	8,417	57.45%	40	0.27%
1960	6,991	42.31%	9,439	57.13%	92	0.56%
1964	5,753	30.54%	13,073	69.39%	14	0.07%
1968	7,796	43.07%	8,643	47.75%	1,662	9.18%
1972	10,509	56.52%	7,274	39.12%	812	4.37%
1976	8,263	49.65%	8,061	48.44%	318	1.91%
1980	10,531	55.37%	7,299	38.37%	1,191	6.26%
1984	13,364	64.10%	7,324	35.13%	160	0.77%
1988	12,118	56.41%	9,142	42.56%	222	1.03%
1992	10,673	41.61%	9,982	38.91%	4,996	19.48%
1996	12,368	47.91%	11,254	43.59%	2,193	8.50%
2000	16,377	57.80%	11,041	38.97%	917	3.24%
2004	21,003	65.41%	10,833	33.74%	274	0.85%
2008	19,710	56.14%	14,747	42.00%	651	1.85%
2012	17,671	56.24%	12,979	41.31%	768	2.44%
2016	18,093	53.35%	13,617	40.15%	2,205	6.50%
2020	24,072	54.88%	18,699	42.63%	1,090	2.49%
2024	25,074	60.41%	15,519	37.39%	915	2.20%

In November 2008, Kings County voted 73.7% for Proposition 8 which amended the California Constitution to define marriage as between one man and one woman.

== Crime ==
The following table includes the number of incidents reported and the rate per 1,000 persons for each type of offense.

Population and crime rates
Population	152,335	
Violent crime	562	3.69
Homicide	4	0.03
Forcible rape	32	0.21
Robbery	77	0.51
Aggravated assault	449	2.95
Property crime	1,513	9.93
Burglary	774	5.08
Larceny-theft (Note: Only larceny-theft cases involving property over $400 in value are reported as property crimes.)	1,428	9.37
Motor vehicle theft	294	1.93
Arson	30	0.20

=== Cities by population and crime rates ===
Cities by population and crime rates
City	Population	Violent crimes	Violent crime rate per 1,000 persons	Property crimes	Property crime rate per 1,000 persons
Avenal	15,704	53	3.37	132	8.41
Corcoran	25,119	89	3.54	328	13.06
Hanford	54,787	309	5.64	1,711	31.23
Lemoore	24,904	131	5.26	698	28.03

== Economy ==
The economy is based on agriculture. About 87% of Kings County's 890,000 acres is agricultural farmland. The gross value of all agricultural crops and products produced during 2018 in Kings County was $2,351,983,000. Kings County is 10th among California counties in agricultural production. The top commodity in 2018 was milk with a value of $676.7 million. Other major agricultural commodities included pistachios, cotton, cattle and calves, almonds and processing tomatoes. Another major employer is NAS Lemoore, the U.S. Navy's newest and largest master jet base. According to a Navy study in 2008, payroll, base spending, retiree and veterans' checks total more than $1 billion in annual economic impact to the region. Other important employers include a Del Monte Foods tomato processing plant, Adventist Health, the J. G. Boswell Company, an Olam International tomato processing facility, Leprino Foods, the largest mozzarella cheese maker in the world, the Kings County Government and the California Department of Corrections and Rehabilitation which operates three state prisons in Kings County.

In 2011–2013, the U.S. Census Bureau estimated that the median household income in the county was $47,035 and that 17.6% of the population was below the poverty line. In 2018, according to the U.S. Bureau of Economic Analysis, average per capita income was $35,306 in Kings County, which ranked it last of California's 58 counties. Per capita personal income is calculated by dividing the population by the total personal income of the area's residents. In Kings County's case, the U.S. Census Bureau's estimated population of 151,366 was used for that calculation. However, the population estimate includes incarcerated persons with little or no income.

The homeownership rate was 54.2% at the time of the 2010 census. According to Zillow Real Estate Research, an estimated 24% of homeowners in the county owned their homes free and clear in the third quarter of 2012.

Taxable sales in 2015 totaled about $1.7 billion.

Kings County did not escape the effects of the Great Recession. The unemployment rate in May 2012 was 14.9%, up from 10.1% in July 2008. However, the rate had dropped to 9.8% in February 2020 at the eve of the COVID-19 pandemic. The unemployment rate had risen to 16.8% in April of that year. According to the California Employment Development Department, as of December 2012, civilian employment totaled 53,100 and an additional 8,900 people were unemployed. Many residents of Kings County were employed in services (31,900 persons, including 14,800 government employees) and agriculture (5,500 employees) as well as in some manufacturing enterprises (4,300 employees) and construction (1,000 employees). Jeffrey Michael, director of the Business Forecasting Center at the University of the Pacific, stated in an October 2010 newspaper interview that nearly half of Kings County's personal earnings come from government jobs, which pay more than agricultural employment.

Kings County's dairy industry dropped from $670 million in milk sold in 2008 to $411 million in 2009 - a 39% drop. By mid-2009, the price paid to milk producers had dropped to a point that was far below the cost of production according to a July 2009 quote from Bill Van Dam, CEO of the Alliance of Western Milk Producers. By December 2010, milk prices had increased to about $13 per hundredweight from a low of below $10 in 2009. However, the price of corn used for feed had increased because of its use by the ethanol industry. Van Dam was quoted that month as saying that at current prices, dairy operators are at or close to the break-even point. By the summer of 2012, it was reported that despite a milk price of about $15 per hundredweight, the rising cost of cattle feed had caused many dairy farmers to sell all or part of their herds and even file for bankruptcy. In 2014, milk prices were topping $22 per hundredweight and the value of milk sold rose to $970 million in that year. However, by March 2016 milk was reportedly selling closer to $13 per hundredweight.

== Culture ==
Kings County has a large annual celebration held each May called Kings County Homecoming Week. In 2015, the event was scaled back to one day and renamed Pioneer Days. The event returned as Kings County Homecoming Week in 2016 but without the traditional parade.

== Transportation ==
=== Major highways ===
- Interstate 5
- State Route 33
- State Route 41
- State Route 43
- State Route 137
- State Route 198
- State Route 269

=== Public transportation ===
Kings Area Regional Transit (KART) operates regularly scheduled fixed route bus service, vanpool service for commuters and Paratransit (demand response) services throughout Kings County as well as to Fresno.

Amtrak trains stop in Corcoran and Hanford.

Greyhound provides inter-city bus service to/from Visalia or Paso Robles. FlixBus stops in Avenal.

The California High-Speed Rail project is currently under construction, with the right-of-way routed through the county. The Kings–Tulare Regional Station is currently under construction in Hanford.

=== Airports ===
Hanford Municipal Airport is a general aviation airport located just southeast of Hanford. The privately owned airport in Avenal is the home of the Central California Soaring Club.

== Communities ==
=== Incorporated cities ===
- Avenal
- Corcoran
- Hanford (county seat)
- Lemoore

=== Census-designated places ===
- Armona
- Grangeville
- Hardwick
- Home Garden
- Kettleman City
- Lemoore Station
- Stratford

=== Unincorporated communities ===
- Halls Corner
- Lakeside, California

=== Formerly proposed new city ===
- Quay Valley

=== Native American Reservation ===
- Santa Rosa Rancheria

=== Population ranking ===
The population ranking of the following table is based on the 2010 census of Kings County.

† county seat

Rank	City/Town/etc.	Municipal type	Population (2010 Census)
1	† Hanford	City	53,967
2	Corcoran	City	24,813
3	Lemoore	City	24,531
4	Avenal	City	15,505
5	Lemoore Station	CDP	7,438
6	Armona	CDP	4,156
7	Home Garden	CDP	1,761
8	Kettleman City	CDP	1,439
9	Stratford	CDP	1,277
10	Santa Rosa Rancheria	AIAN	652
11	Grangeville	CDP	469
12	Hardwick	CDP	138

== See also ==
- California census statistical areas
- List of museums in the San Joaquin Valley
- Mussel Slough Tragedy
- National Register of Historic Places listings in Kings County, California
