= Grangeville, California =

Grangeville
- census-designated place
- Location of Grangeville in Kings County, California.

- Location in California
- Coordinates: 36°20′37″N 119°42′31″W
- Country: United States
- State: California
- County: Kings

Area
  - Total: 0.640 sq mi (1.658 km^{2})
  - Land: 0.640 sq mi (1.658 km^{2})
  - Water: 0 sq mi (0 km^{2}) 0%
- Elevation: 249 ft (76 m)

Population (2020)
  - Total: 508
  - Density: 794/sq mi (306/km^{2})
- Time zone: UTC-8 (Pacific (PST))
  - Summer (DST): UTC-7 (PDT)
- ZIP code: 93230
- Area code: 559
- GNIS feature IDs: 1660694; 2628734

Grangeville is a census-designated place (CDP) in Kings County, California, United States. The population was 508 at the 2020 Census. The community is located 3.5 miles (5.6 km) west-northwest of Hanford, at an elevation of 249 feet (76 m).

A post office operated at Grangeville from 1874 to 1920.

Grangeville was founded in 1874 by James A. Hackett and Peter Kanawyer. It is the oldest existing community in Kings County. When the Southern Pacific Railroad bypassed Grangeville in 1876, the thriving new community dwindled in size and importance.

== Demographics ==
Historical population
Census	Pop.	Note	%±
2010	469		—
2020	508		8.3%
U.S. Decennial Census; 1850–1870 1880-1890; 1900 1910 1920; 1930 1940 1950; 1960 1970 1980; 1990 2000 2010

Grangeville first appeared as a census designated place in the 2010 U.S. census.

The 2020 United States census reported that Grangeville had a population of 508. The population density was 793.8 inhabitants per square mile (306.5/km^{2}). The racial makeup of Grangeville was 318 (62.6%) White, 7 (1.4%) African American, 6 (1.2%) Native American, 27 (5.3%) Asian, 1 (0.2%) Pacific Islander, 80 (15.7%) from other races, and 69 (13.6%) from two or more races. Hispanic or Latino of any race were 171 persons (33.7%).

The whole population lived in households. There were 171 households, out of which 67 (39.2%) had children under the age of 18 living in them, 112 (65.5%) were married-couple households, 8 (4.7%) were cohabiting couple households, 20 (11.7%) had a female householder with no partner present, and 31 (18.1%) had a male householder with no partner present. 26 households (15.2%) were one person, and 7 (4.1%) were one person aged 65 or older. The average household size was 2.97. There were 139 families (81.3% of all households).

The age distribution was 133 people (26.2%) under the age of 18, 63 people (12.4%) aged 18 to 24, 78 people (15.4%) aged 25 to 44, 148 people (29.1%) aged 45 to 64, and 86 people (16.9%) who were 65 years of age or older. The median age was 40.2 years. For every 100 females, there were 91.7 males.

There were 178 housing units at an average density of 278.1 units per square mile (107.4 units/km^{2}), of which 171 (96.1%) were occupied. Of these, 119 (69.6%) were owner-occupied, and 52 (30.4%) were occupied by renters.
