= Kingston, California =

Kingston
- Former settlement
- Interactive map of Kingston
- Coordinates: 36°25′24.71″N 119°41′37.9″W
- Country: United States
- State: California
- County: Kings

California Historical Landmark
- Reference no.: 270

Kingston is a former town that was originally in Fresno County, until 1909 when that territory south of Kings River was transferred to Kings County, California, United States. It was located on the south bank of the Kings River, 8.5 miles (13.7 km) northwest of Hanford at Whitmore's Ferry.

L. A. Whitmore established the ferry in 1854. It was founded in 1856 by Lucious A. Whitmore who operated the first ferry to cross the Kings River. The town of Kingston grew up around the ferry at the place where an old Spanish road called El Camino Viejo á Los Angeles (The Old Road to Los Angeles) crossed the river. Kingston became a stopping place on the Butterfield Overland Mail route from 1858 to 1861 and a stage route between Stockton and Visalia after 1858. A post office operated at Kingston from 1859 to 1862, and from 1866 to 1890, when the service transferred to Lillis. Until at least 1872, the only store between Millerton and Visalia was in Kingston. The first school in the area was probably the one established as early as 1860 in Kingston.

Oliver H. Bliss operated the Kingston ferry after Whitmore, beginning in 1859. Bliss built a temporary toll bridge with two boats and planking in 1872. In 1873, John Sutherland purchased Bliss's interest in both the ferry and the bridge and built a permanent bridge that year.

On December 26, 1873, Tiburcio Vásquez and his bandit gang made a bold raid, robbing the entire village. Reportedly 35 or more men were tied up and over $2,000 in loot was hauled away. Subsequently, the town declined and by the 1890s Kingston was abandoned. Oliver Bliss' livery stable was the last remaining building and stood until 1930.

The site of the town is now a California Historical Landmark (#270), which can be found in Kingston-Laton County Park in Kings County.
