= Hanford (surname) =

Hanford is a surname with Welsh origins. Notable people with this surname include:

- Thomas Hanford (1621–1693), founder of Norwalk, Connecticut
- Benjamin Hanford (1861–1910), American politician
- Burke Hanford (1872–1928), United States Navy sailor and Medal of Honor recipient
- Charles B. Hanford (1859–1926), American stage actor
- Charlie Hanford (1882–1963), American baseball player
- Cornelius H. Hanford (1849–1926), American judge
- Dan Hanford (born 1991), Welsh footballer
- Deirdre Hanford, American business executive at Synopsys, Inc
- Frank Hanford (1853–1921), American politician and businessman
- Harry Hanford (1907–1996), Welsh footballer
- Henry Hanford (1784–1866), American pioneer
- Ira Hanford (1918–2009), American jockey
- James Madison Hanford (1827–1911), American railroad executive
- Jamie Hanford (born 1975), American lacrosse player
- John Hanford (born c. 1958), American ambassador
- Martin Hanford (born 1974), British fantasy artist
- Thaddeus Hanford (1847–1892), American editor

== See also ==
- Handford, a surname
