= James Hanford =

James Hanford may refer to:

- James Madison Hanford, American railroad executive
- James Holly Hanford, professor and author known for his scholarship on John Milton
- Jamie Hanford, American lacrosse player
