= Hanford =

Hanford may refer to:

== Places ==
- Hanford (constituency), a constituency in Tuen Mun, People's Republic of China
- Hanford, Dorset, a village and parish in England
- Hanford, Staffordshire, England
- Hanford, California, United States
- Hanford, Iowa, United States
- Hanford, Washington, a community depopulated by the U.S. government in March 1943

== Schools ==
- Hanford School, a school in Hanford, Dorset
- Hanford High School, a high school in Richland, Washington

== Other uses ==
- Hanford (surname)
- Hanford Site, a nuclear complex
- Hanford Tri-State Airlines or Mid-Continent Airlines
- USS Hanford

== People with the given name ==
- Hanford Dixon (born 1958), American football player and sports announcer
- Hanford L. King Jr. (1921-1986), bishop of the Episcopal Diocese of Idaho
- Hanford MacNider (1889–1968), American diplomat and US Army General

== See also ==
- Handford, a surname
- Hanford Carnegie Museum
- Hanford Reach, a free-flowing section of the Columbia River
- Hanford Reach National Monument
