= HJO =

HJO may refer to:

- Highest judicial organ, the supreme court in a communist state
- Hjo, a city in Västra Götaland, Sweden
- Hjo Municipality, in Västra Götaland, Sweden
- Hanford Municipal Airport, in California, United States
- Haley Joel Osment, American actor
