= Seattle Post-Intelligencer =

Newspaper in Seattle, Washington

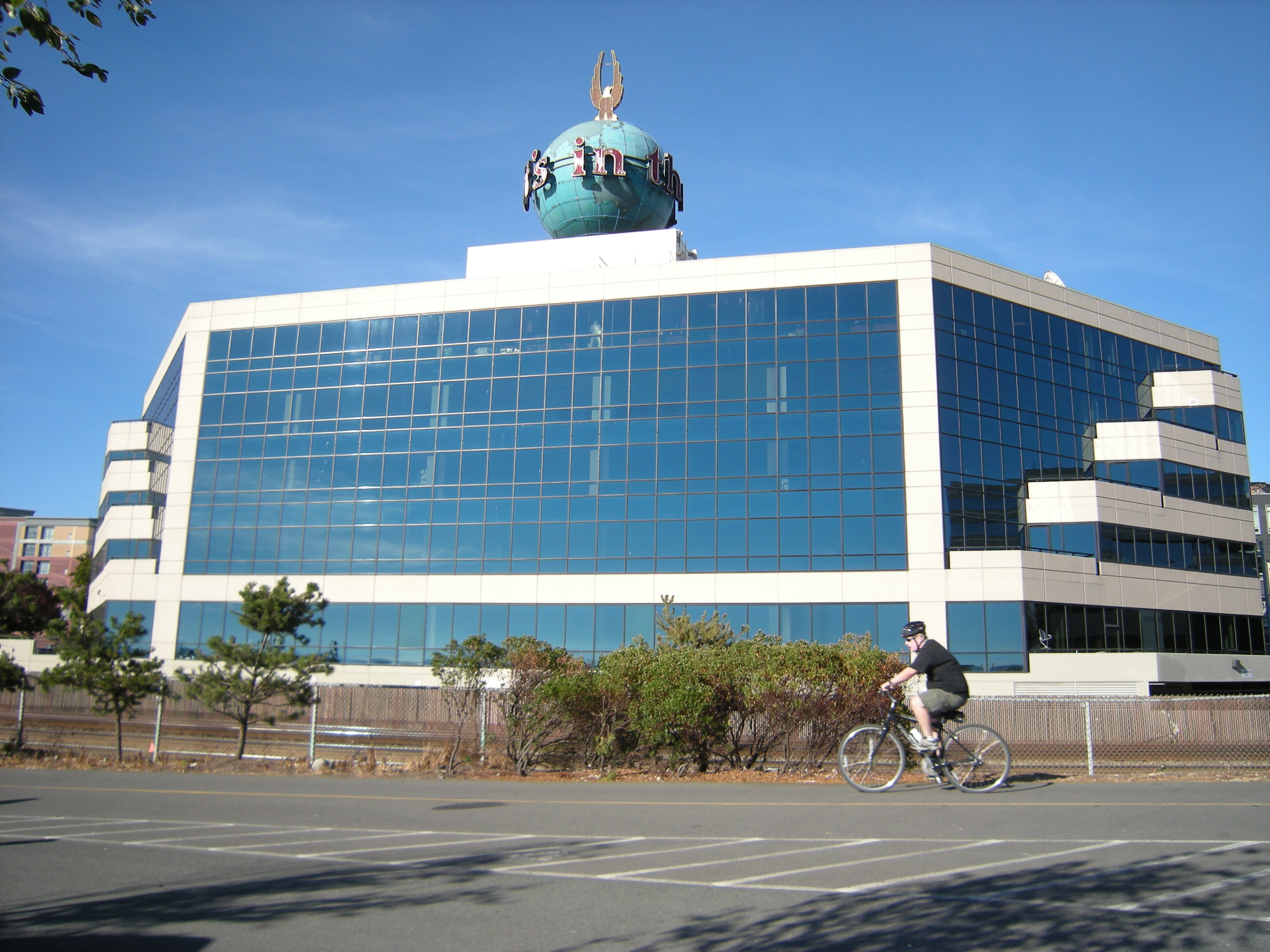
- Former P-I headquarters at Myrtle Edwards Park
- Type: Online newspaper
- Format: Broadsheet (until 2009)
- Owner: Hearst Communications
- Founded: December 10, 1863
- Headquarters: 701 5th Avenue, 48th Floor; Seattle, Washington, U.S.
- ISSN: 0745-970X
- OCLC number: 3734418
- Website: seattlepi.com

Seattlepi.com, previously the Seattle Post-Intelligencer, (popularly known as the Seattle P-I, the Post-Intelligencer, or simply the P-I) is an online newspaper and former print newspaper based in Seattle, Washington, United States.

The newspaper was founded in 1863 as the weekly Seattle Gazette, and was later published daily in broadsheet format. It was long one of the city's two daily newspapers, along with The Seattle Times, until it became an online-only publication on March 18, 2009.

== History ==
The logo of the Seattle Post-Intelligencer before its transition to online-only publication

The front page of the last printed edition of the Seattle Post-Intelligencer, published on March 17, 2009.

J.R. Watson founded the Seattle Gazette, Seattle's first newspaper, on December 10, 1863. The paper failed after a few years and was renamed the Weekly Intelligencer in 1867 by new owner Sam Maxwell.

In 1878, after publishing the Intelligencer as a morning daily, printer Thaddeus Hanford bought the Daily Intelligencer for $8,000. Hanford also acquired Beriah Brown's daily Puget Sound Dispatch and the weekly Pacific Tribune and folded both papers into the Intelligencer. In 1881, the Intelligencer merged with the Seattle Post. The names were combined to form the present-day name.

In 1886, Indiana businessman Leigh S. J. Hunt came to Seattle and purchased the Seattle Post-Intelligencer, which he owned and published until he was forced to sell in the Panic of 1893. At this point the newspaper was acquired by attorney and real estate developer James D. Hoge under whom it was representative of an establishment viewpoint. It was the state's predominant newspaper. Circulation was greatly increased by coverage of the Klondike Gold Rush in 1897. Hoge, who was involved in other business, sought to find a buyer and sold in 1899. The newspaper was acquired with assistance from James J. Hill by John L. Wilson who had first started the Seattle Klondike Information Bureau. The newspaper was acquired by Hearst in 1921.

Circulation stood at 31,000 in 1911. In 1912, editor Eric W. Allen left the paper to found the University of Oregon School of Journalism, which he ran until his death in 1944.

William Randolph Hearst took over the paper in 1921, and the Hearst Corporation owns the P-I to this day.

In 1936, 35 P-I writers and members of The Newspaper Guild went on three-month strike against "arbitrary dismissals and assignment changes and other 'efficiency' moves by the newspaper." The International Brotherhood of Teamsters joined the strike in solidarity. Roger Simpson and William Ames co-wrote their book Unionism or Hearst: the Seattle Post-Intelligencer Strike of 1936 on the topic.

Anna Roosevelt Halsted, the daughter of Franklin and Eleanor Roosevelt, began working as the editor of the women's page at the P-I after her husband Clarence John Boettiger took over as publisher in 1936. Boettiger left Seattle to enter the United States Army in April 1943, while Anna stayed at the paper to help keep a liberal voice in the running of the paper. After Boettiger's absence, the paper increasingly turned conservative with Hearst's new acting publisher. Anna left Seattle in December 1943 to live in the White House with her youngest child, Johnny. This effectively ended the Roosevelt-Boettiger ties with the P-I.

On December 15, 2006, no copies were printed as a result of a power outage caused by the December 2006 Pacific Northwest storms. It was the first time in 70 years that publication had been suspended.

On January 9, 2009, the Hearst Corporation announced that after losing money on it every year since 2000, Hearst was putting the P-I up for sale. The paper would be put on the market for 60 days, and if a buyer could not be found within that time, the paper would either be turned into an Internet-only publication with a drastically reduced staff, or closed outright. The news of the paper's impending sale was initially broken by local station KING-TV the night prior to the official announcement, and came as a surprise to the P-I's staff and the owners of rival newspaper The Seattle Times. Analysts did not expect a buyer to be found, in view of declining circulation in the U.S. newspaper industry and other newspapers on the market going unsold. Five days before the 60-day deadline, the P-I reported that the Hearst Corporation had given several P-I reporters provisional job offers for an online edition of the P-I.

On March 16, 2009, the newspaper posted a headline on its front page, followed shortly after by a short news story, that explained that the following day's edition would be its final one in print. The newspaper's publisher, Roger Oglesby, was quoted saying that the P-I would continue as an online-only operation. Print subscribers had their subscriptions automatically transferred to The Seattle Times on March 18.

As of 2024, the P-I continues as an online-only newspaper. In September 2010, the site had an estimated 2.8 million unique visitors and 208,000 visitors per day.

== Joint operating agreement ==
From 1983 to 2009, the P-I and The Seattle Times had a joint operating agreement (JOA) whereby advertising, production, marketing, and circulation were run for both papers by The Seattle Times company. They maintained separate news and editorial departments. The papers published a combined Sunday edition, although the Times handled the majority of the editorial content while the P-I only provided a small editorial/opinions section. The JOA was proposed by Hearst in 1981 due to $14 million in cumulative financial losses incurred by the P-I.

In 2003 the Times tried to cancel the JOA, citing a clause in it that three consecutive years of losses were cause for cancelling the agreement. Hearst disagreed, and immediately filed suit to prevent the Times from cancelling the agreement. Hearst argued that a force majeure clause prevented the Times from claiming losses in 2000 and 2001 as reason to end the JOA, because they resulted from extraordinary events (in this case, a seven-week newspaper strike).

Each side publicly accused the other of attempting to put its rival out of business. The trial judge granted a summary judgment in Hearst's favor on the force majeure issue. But after two appeals, the Washington State Supreme Court ruled in favor of the Times on June 30, 2005, on the force majeure clause, reversing the trial-court judge. The two papers settled the issue on April 16, 2007.

The JOA ended in 2009 with the cessation of the P-I print edition.

== Awards ==
The P-I was notable for its two-time Pulitzer Prize-winning editorial cartoonist, David Horsey.

== Notable reports ==
=== Report on Judge Gary Little ===
Investigative reporting on King County Superior Court Judge Gary Little's out-of-court contact with juvenile defendants revealed accusations that Little molested young boys while he was a teacher at Seattle's exclusive Lakeside School between 1968 and 1971. It also revealed inappropriate contact between Little and juveniles appearing before him after he became a judge. On August 19, 1988, after reporter Duff Wilson called the judge to advise him the newspaper was publishing the story, Little shot himself in the King County Courthouse. The ethical debates surrounding the publication of the story – and the network of connections that protected Little – are taught in journalism classes, and led to reforms in the way judges are disciplined in Washington state.

=== Conduct Unbecoming series ===
In 2006 the P-I became the subject of a complaint to the Washington News Council for its reporting on the King County Sheriff's Office. The media watch-dog group ruled against the P-I, agreeing with Sheriff Sue Rahr's complaint that the newspaper had unfairly disparaged the Sheriff's Office. The P-I declined to participate in the proceedings, and opted instead to give a detailed reply on its website.

== The P-I Globe ==
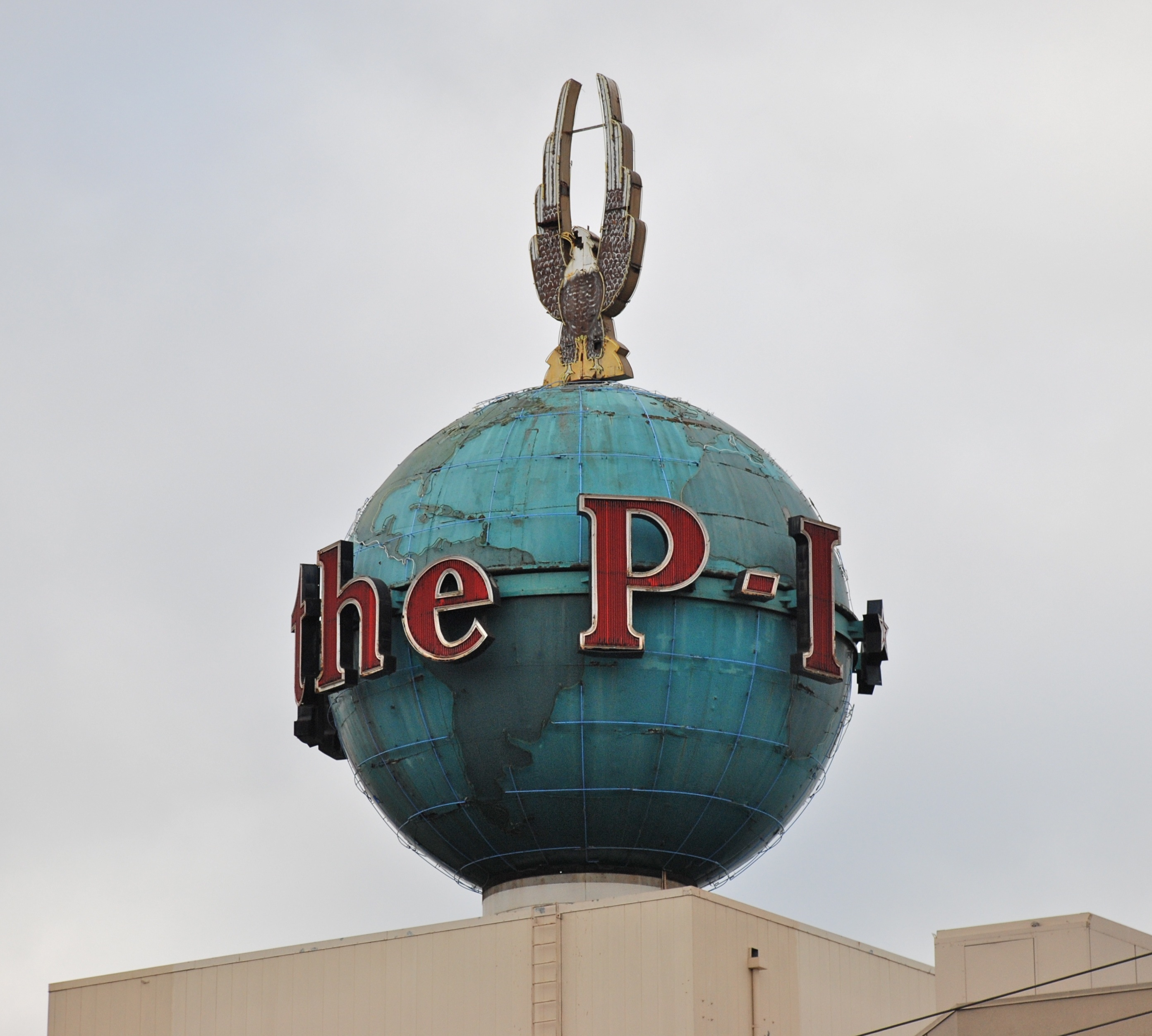
The P-I Globe is an official Seattle Landmark.

The P-I is known for the 13.5-ton, 30-foot (9.1 m) neon globe atop its headquarters on the Elliott Bay waterfront, which features the words "It's in the P-I" rotating around the globe and an 18-foot (5.5 m) eagle perched atop with wings stretched upwards. The globe originated from a 1947 readers' contest to determine a new symbol for the paper. Out of 350 entrants, the winner was Jack (known as Jakk) C. Corsaw, a University of Washington art student. The globe was manufactured in 1948 and was placed atop the paper's then-new headquarters building at 6th Avenue and Wall Street (now City University of Seattle). When the newspaper moved its headquarters again in 1986 to its current location on the waterfront, the globe was relocated to the new building. A stylized rendering of the globe appeared on the masthead of the newspaper in its latter years and continues to feature on its website.

In April 2012, it was designated a Seattle landmark by the city's Landmarks Preservation Board. Mayor Ed Murray signed a city ordinance that had been passed by the Seattle City Council on December 17, 2015, that designated the globe as an official city landmark.

In March 2012, the globe was donated to the Museum of History and Industry, which planned to refurbish and relocate it, but as of 2026, this had not occurred.

== Notable employees ==
Notable employees of the P-I have included two-time Pulitzer Prize winning editorial cartoonist and commentator David Horsey, two-time Pulitzer Prize winning investigative reporter Eric Nalder, Pulitzer Prize winning journalist and author Timothy Egan, journalist and author Darrell Bob Houston ("King of the Midnight Blue", a novel loosely based on the noted highjacking by D.B. Cooper), the novelists E. B. White, Frank Herbert, Tom Robbins, Adam Schefter, and Emmett Watson, as well as Lewis Kamb, a winner of the Pulitzer Prize for National Reporting while working at The Seattle Times, and Andrew Schneider, who won two Pulitzer Prizes for specialized reporting and public service while working at The Pittsburgh Press.

== See also ==
- Pioneer Square totem pole
- Hutch Award (baseball award bestowed at P-I's annual "Sports Star of the Year" banquet)
