= Kings County Courthouse (California) =

- U.S. National Register of Historic Places
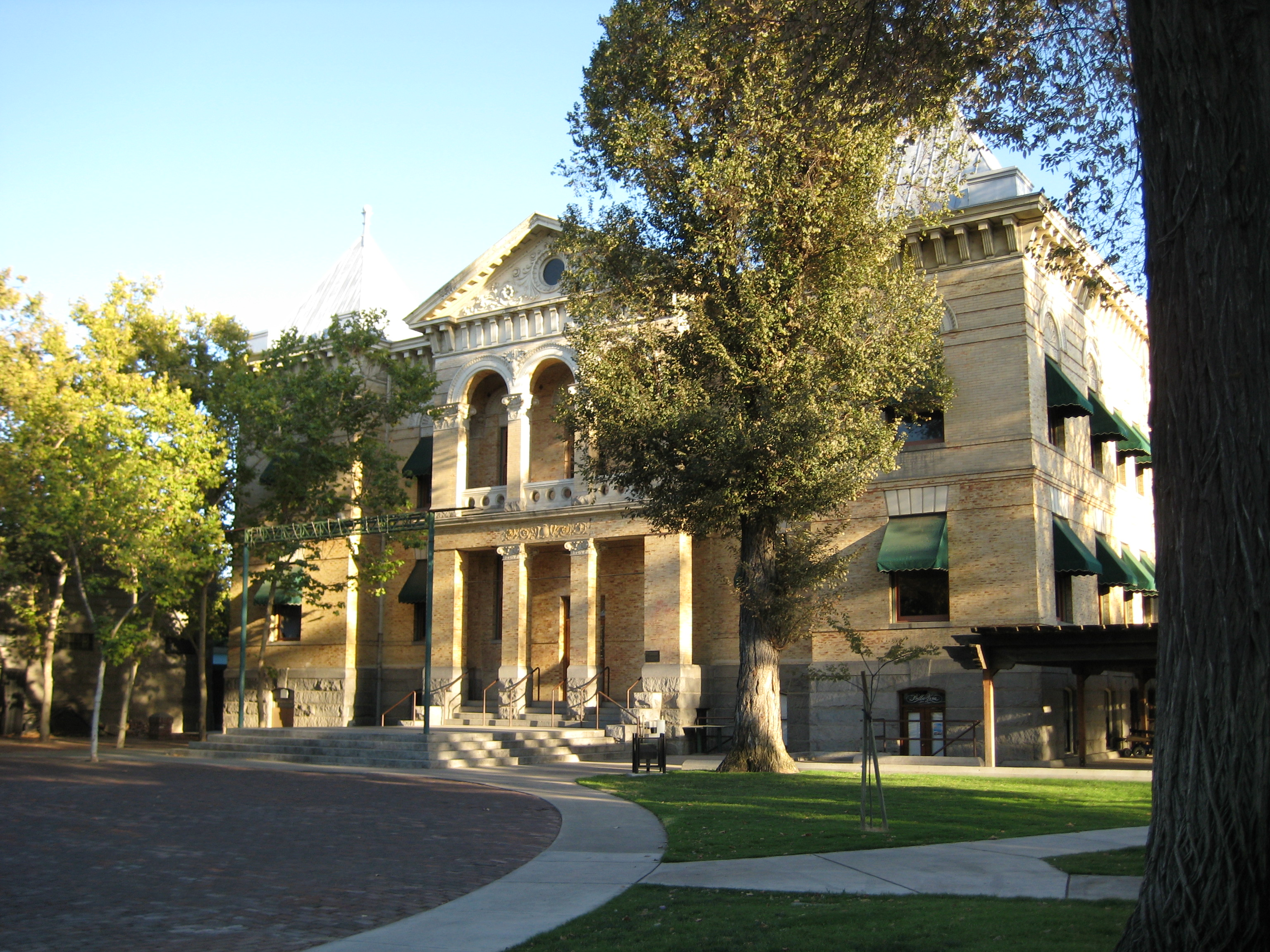
- Kings County Courthouse

- Location within California Location within the United States
- Location: 114 W. 8th St. Hanford, California
- Coordinates: 36°19′41.2″N 119°38′48.7″W
- Built: 1896
- Architect: Haggerty, John & Wilcox, W.H.
- Architectural style: Classical Revival
- NRHP reference No.: 78003063
- Added to NRHP: September 21, 1978

The Kings County Courthouse was erected after Kings County, California was formed; it opened in 1896. Constructed in an eclectic mix of styles in a park in the center of Hanford, it was expanded in 1914. The building served as the county's courthouse until 1976 when it was replaced by the new Kings County Government Center on West Lacey Boulevard.

The building was listed on the National Register of Historic Places in 1978. The old courthouse was remodeled in the early 1980s and now houses offices, small shops and restaurants.
