= Hanford Elementary School District =

School district in California, United States

Location
- PO Box 1067; Hanford, California, 93232 United States

Other information
- Website: www.hesd.k12.ca.us

Hanford Elementary School District is a public school district in Kings County, California, United States.
