= Handforth (surname) =

Handforth is a town in Cheshire, England

Handforth is also a surname. Notable people with this surname include:

- Mark Handforth (born 1969), Hong Kong-born sculptor in Miami
- Paul Handforth (born 1981), English rugby league footballer
- Thomas Handforth (1897–1948), American artist and etcher
- Ernest Handforth Goodman Roberts (1890–1969), British politician and Chief Justice

== See also ==
- Handford
