= Frank Hanford =

American politician

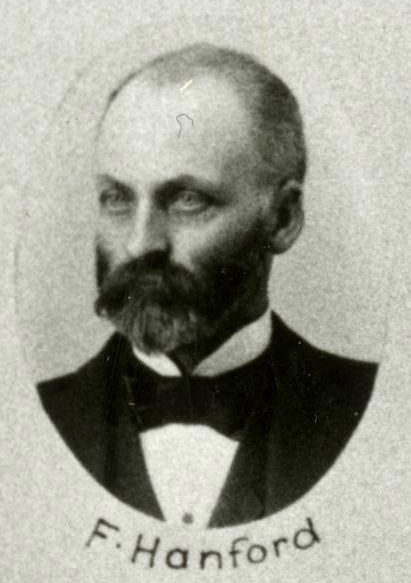
- Hanford in 1895

Member of the Washington House of Representatives for the 41st district
- In office 1895–1897

Personal details
- Born: January 9, 1853 Winchester, Van Buren County, Iowa, United States
- Died: November 20, 1921 (aged 68) Stretch Island, Mason County, Washington, United States
- Party: Republican Party
- Spouse: Anna Eva Wait (1886–1894)
- Children: Frank W. R. Hanford

Frank Hanford (January 9, 1853 – November 20, 1921) was an American politician and businessman in the state of Washington. He was elected to the Seattle City Council in 1890 and the Washington House of Representatives in 1895.

Hanford was president and treasurer of the Tubal-Cain Copper & Manganese Mining Company, which owned the Tubal Cain mine in the Olympic Mountains.
