= Cornelius H. Hanford =

American judge (1849–1926)

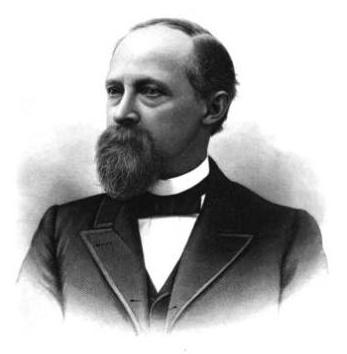
- circa 1890

Judge of the United States District Court for the Western District of Washington
- In office March 2, 1905 – August 5, 1912
- Appointed by: operation of law
- Preceded by: Seat established by 33 Stat. 824
- Succeeded by: Clinton Woodbury Howard

Judge of the United States District Court for the District of Washington
- In office February 25, 1890 – March 2, 1905
- Appointed by: Benjamin Harrison
- Preceded by: Seat established by 25 Stat. 676
- Succeeded by: Seat abolished

Personal details
- Born: Cornelius Holgate Hanford; April 21, 1849 Winchester, Iowa
- Died: March 2, 1926 (aged 76) Pierce County, Washington
- Relatives: Thaddeus Hanford
- Education: read law

Cornelius Holgate Hanford (April 21, 1849 – March 2, 1926) was a United States district judge of the United States District Court for the District of Washington and the United States District Court for the Western District of Washington, and was the only Judge to serve in the District of Washington and the first to serve in the Western District of Washington. Hanford resigned in the face of an impeachment investigation by the United States House of Representatives. He was the younger brother of the newspaper editor Thaddeus Hanford.

== Education and career ==
Born on April 21, 1849, in Winchester, Iowa, Hanford read law in 1875. He entered private practice in Seattle, Washington Territory (State of Washington from November 11, 1889) from 1875 to 1889. He was a United States Commissioner for the United States District Court for the District of Washington Territory from 1875 to 1876. He was a member of the Territorial Council for the Washington Territory from 1877 to 1878. He was an Assistant United States Attorney for the District of Washington Territory from 1881 to 1886. He was city attorney for Seattle from 1882 to 1885. He was Chief Justice of the Supreme Court of Washington Territory in 1889.

== Federal judicial service ==
Hanford was nominated by President Benjamin Harrison on February 10, 1890, to the United States District Court for the District of Washington, to a new seat authorized by 25 Stat. 676. He was confirmed by the United States Senate on February 25, 1890, and received his commission the same day. Hanford was reassigned by operation of law to the United States District Court for the Western District of Washington on March 2, 1905, to a new seat authorized by 33 Stat. 824. His service terminated on August 5, 1912, due to his resignation.

=== Impeachment investigation and resignation ===
In 1912, Hanford became the subject of public controversy, and an impeachment inquiry by the United States House of Representatives, after a ruling in which he revoked the citizenship of an immigrant as having been procured by fraud, allegedly due to the person's Socialist beliefs. A House committee investigating the impeachment resolution heard testimony accusing Hanford of habitual drunkenness, and of having accepted financial favors from the Northern Pacific Railroad after making a ruling that reduced the company's tax liability. Hanford resigned his judgeship immediately after the testimony about the Northern Pacific transaction was completed, amid insinuations in the press that further witnesses were about to reveal even more corrupt behavior. The House committee terminated its impeachment proceedings upon his resignation.

== Later career and death ==
Following his resignation from the federal bench, Hanford resumed private practice in Seattle from 1912 to 1926. He died on March 2, 1926, in Honolulu, Hawaii while visiting his son, Major E.C. Hanford.

== Family ==
Hanford was the younger brother of newspaper editor Thaddeus Hanford.

== Honor ==
The former agricultural community of Hanford, Washington was named for Hanford.

Legal offices
Preceded by Seat established by 25 Stat. 676	Judge of the United States District Court for the District of Washington; 1890–1905	Succeeded by Seat abolished
Preceded by Seat established by 33 Stat. 824	Judge of the United States District Court for the Western District of Washington; 1905–1912	Succeeded by Clinton Woodbury Howard
