= Hanford, California =

City in California, United States

- City
- City of Hanford
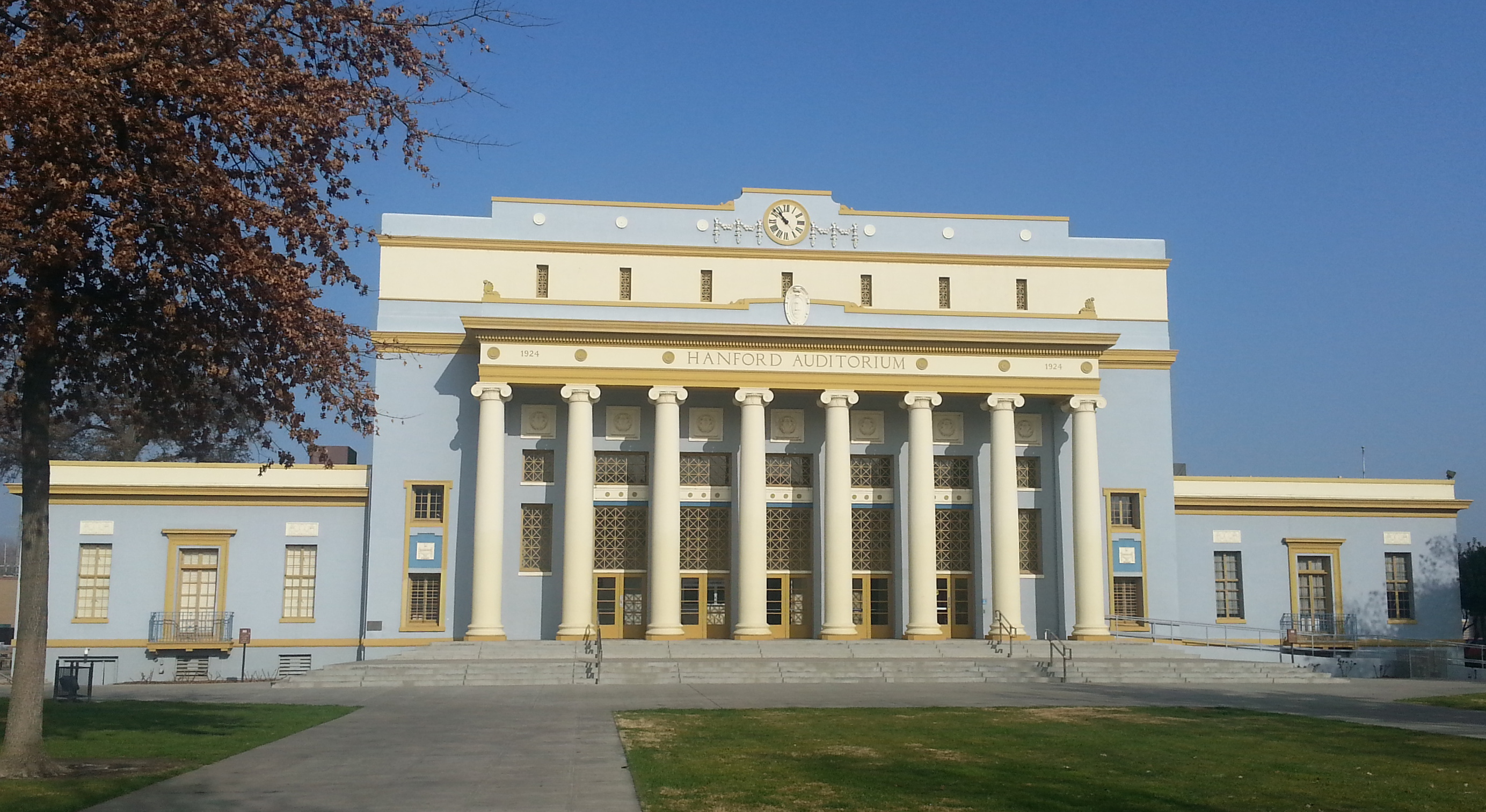
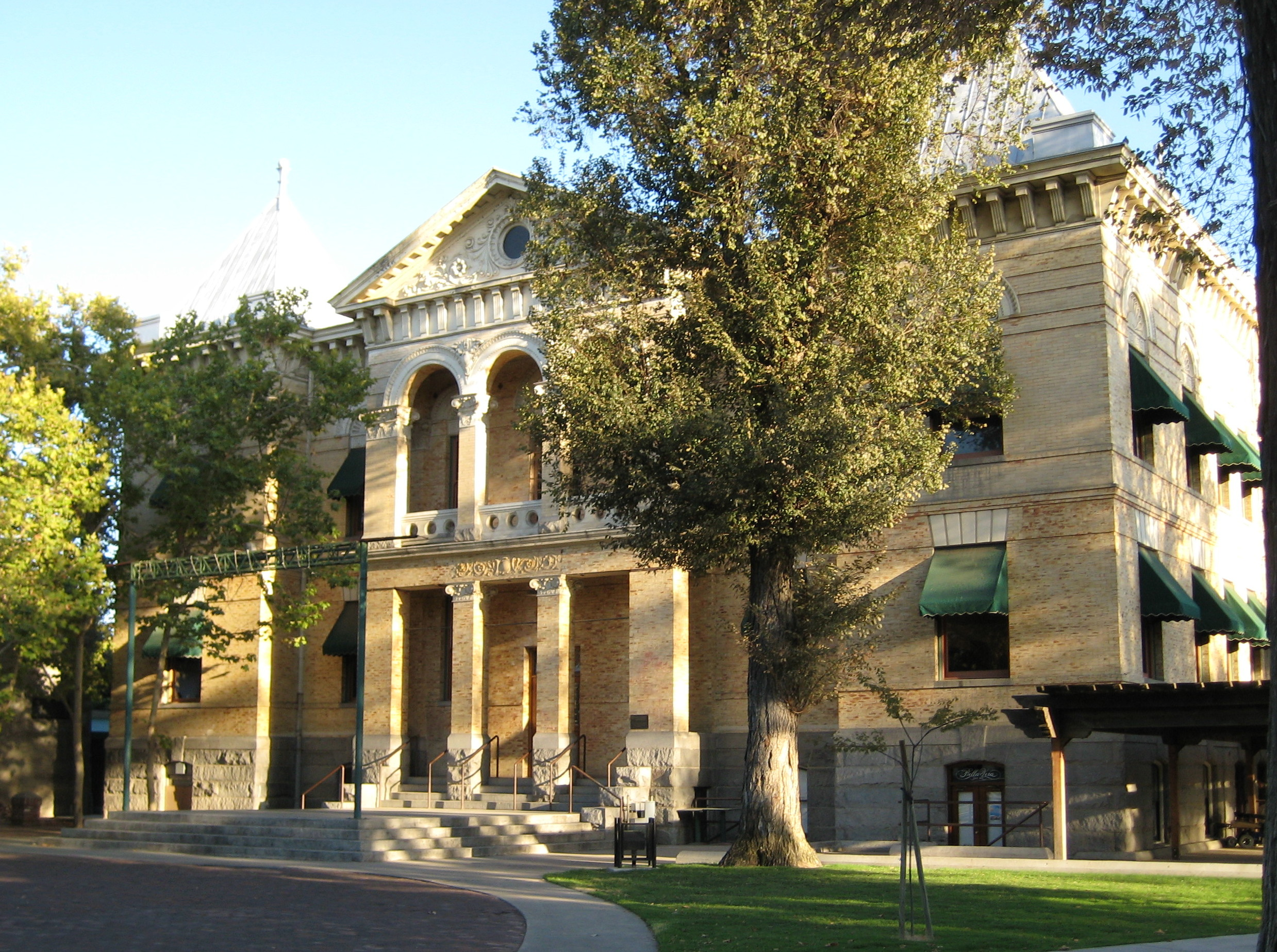
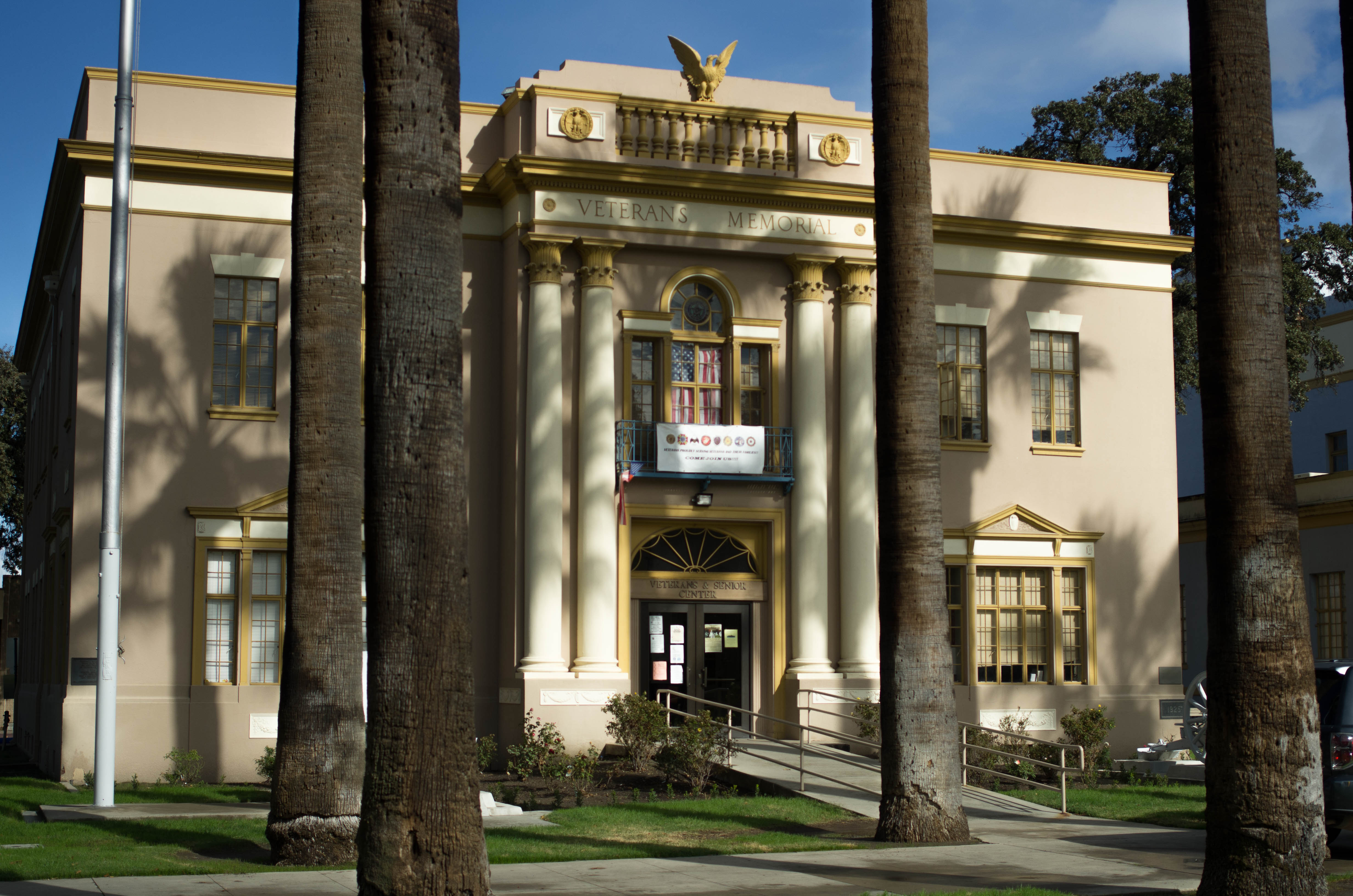
- The Hanford Auditorium Kings County Courthouse Veteran Memorial Hall

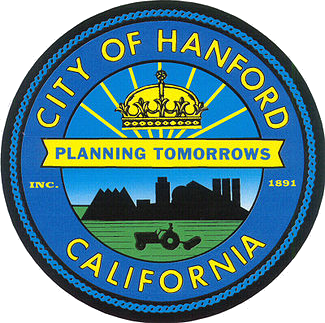
- Seal
- Interactive map of Hanford, California
- Location in the United States
- Coordinates: 36°19′35″N 119°38′14″W
- Country: United States
- State: California
- County: Kings
- Incorporated: August 12, 1891

Area
  - Total: 17.40 sq mi (45.07 km^{2})
  - Land: 17.40 sq mi (45.07 km^{2})
  - Water: 0 sq mi (0.00 km^{2}) 0%
- Elevation: 249 ft (76 m)

Population (2020)
  - Total: 57,990
  - Density: 3,332/sq mi (1,287/km^{2})
- Time zone: UTC−8 (Pacific)
  - Summer (DST): UTC−7 (PDT)
- ZIP codes: 93230, 93232
- Area code: 559
- FIPS code: 06-31960
- GNIS feature ID: 2410696
- Website: cityofhanfordca.com

Hanford is the most populous city in and is the county seat of Kings County, California, United States, located in the San Joaquin Valley region of the greater Central Valley. The population was 57,990 at the 2020 census.

== History ==
Hanford was once north of Tulare Lake, historically the largest body of fresh water west of the Mississippi River. The area was inhabited by the Tachi Yokuts Indians for several thousand years prior to Euro-American contact. They occupied locations along watercourses such as creeks, springs and seep areas (such as sloughs), along perennial and seasonal drainages, as well as flat ridges and terraces.

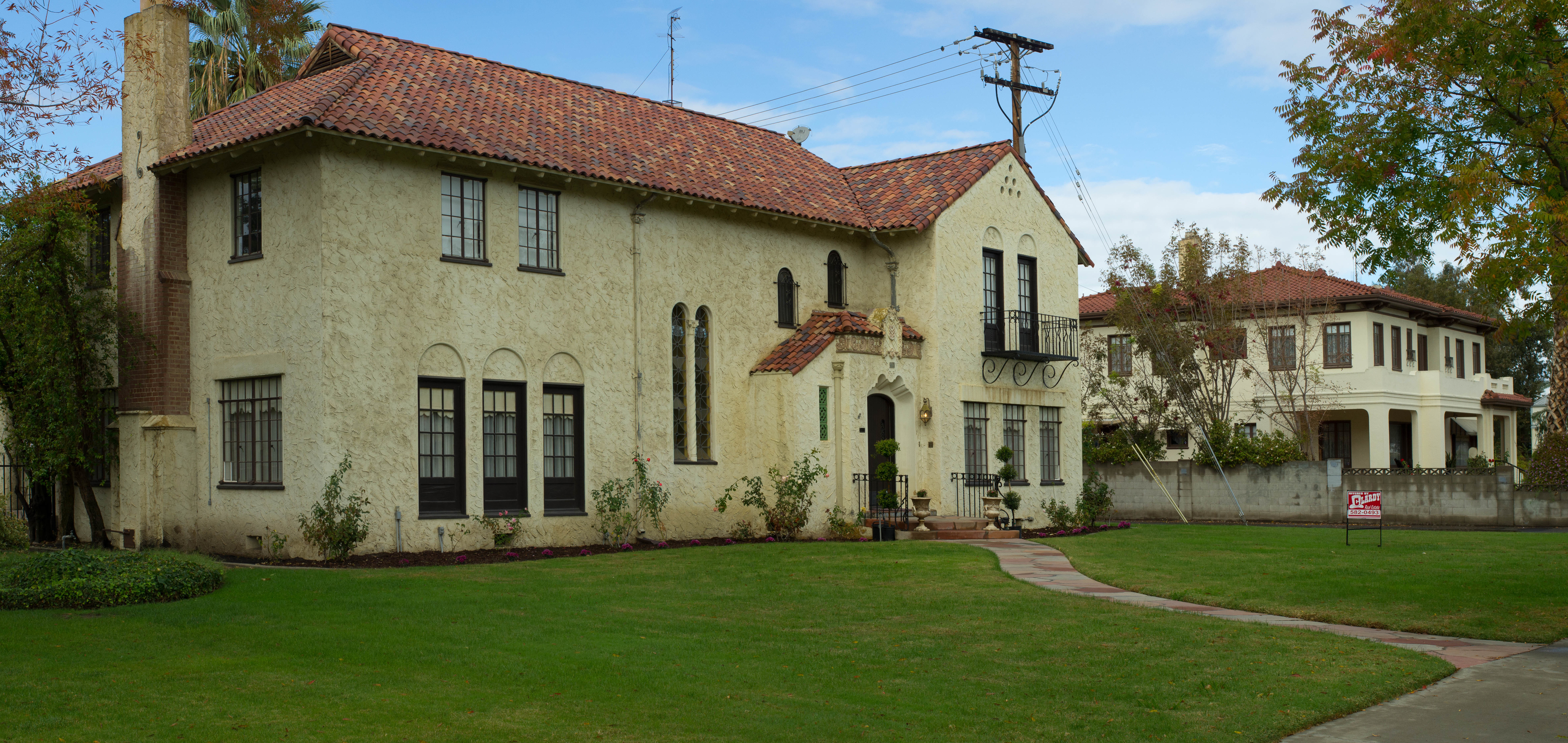
Historic Spanish Colonial Revival style homes in Hanford.

Since the annexation of California after the Mexican-American War, the locality was settled by Americans and immigrants as farmland, broadly referred to as "Mussel Slough". The earliest dated grave in the area was that of a young Alice Spangler who was initially buried in the Kings River Cemetery just north of her family's farm in 1860. As the settlement grew, Tulare Lake's feeding rivers were diverted for agricultural irrigation, causing it to gradually shrink and, over the 19th and 20th centuries, dry up.

From the mid-to-late 1870s, the Southern Pacific Railroad planned to lay tracks towards the developing farmland west of Visalia, spurring a growth in labor and population. Hanford's namesake was James Madison Hanford, an executive for the company. The earliest known document labeling the settlement as "Hanford" is an 1876 map of Tulare County which once included the territory of present-day Kings County. Tracks were laid through a sheep camp in 1877. According to History of Kings County: "It was but a short step from sheep-camp to village and with the railroad as an attraction the village flourished and became a town within a few historic months." Many of those working on the tracks were Chinese immigrants.

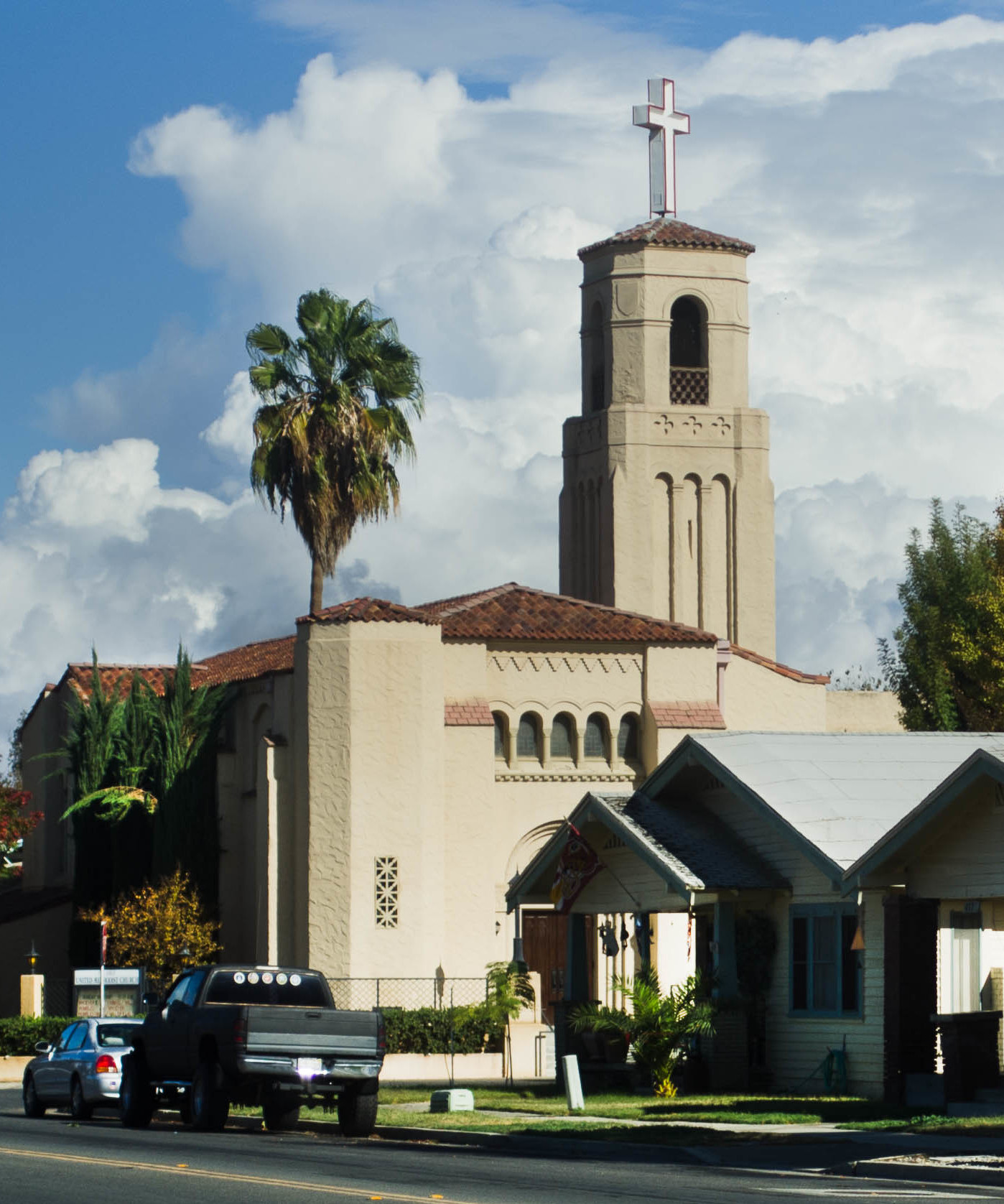
The First United Methodist Church of Hanford, founded in 1877.

In 1877, Hanford began to appear in state newspapers, giving details of events in the town's early days. In 1878, Hanford began running their own newspaper service and wiring called "The Public Good" which fed into other papers. In May 1878, Hanford residents drafted a resolve against the South Pacific Railroad from purchasing land with residing settlers. In June 1878, the Workingmen's Party was reported to have a majority vote over the Democrats in the town.

In May 1878, the Upper Kings River Canal and Irrigation Company filed articles of incorporation. On August 1, California Governor candidates George Clement Perkins and Romualdo Pacheco (and on August 10, O F Thornton and W F White W P C) spoke in Hanford and Lemoore.

In May 1880, a dispute over land titles between settlers and the Southern Pacific Railroad resulted in a bloody gun battle on a farm 5.6 mi (9.0 km) northwest of Hanford that left seven men dead. This event became famous as the Mussel Slough Tragedy. The next month, the town's first census was held counting some 269 residents. Forty-four of them were Chinese immigrants who resided in what's known today as China Alley.

A post office was established in 1887.

On several occasions, major fires destroyed much of the young community's business district. The need for fire protection led to the town becoming an incorporated city in 1891. Its first mayor was local resident Yamon LeBaron.

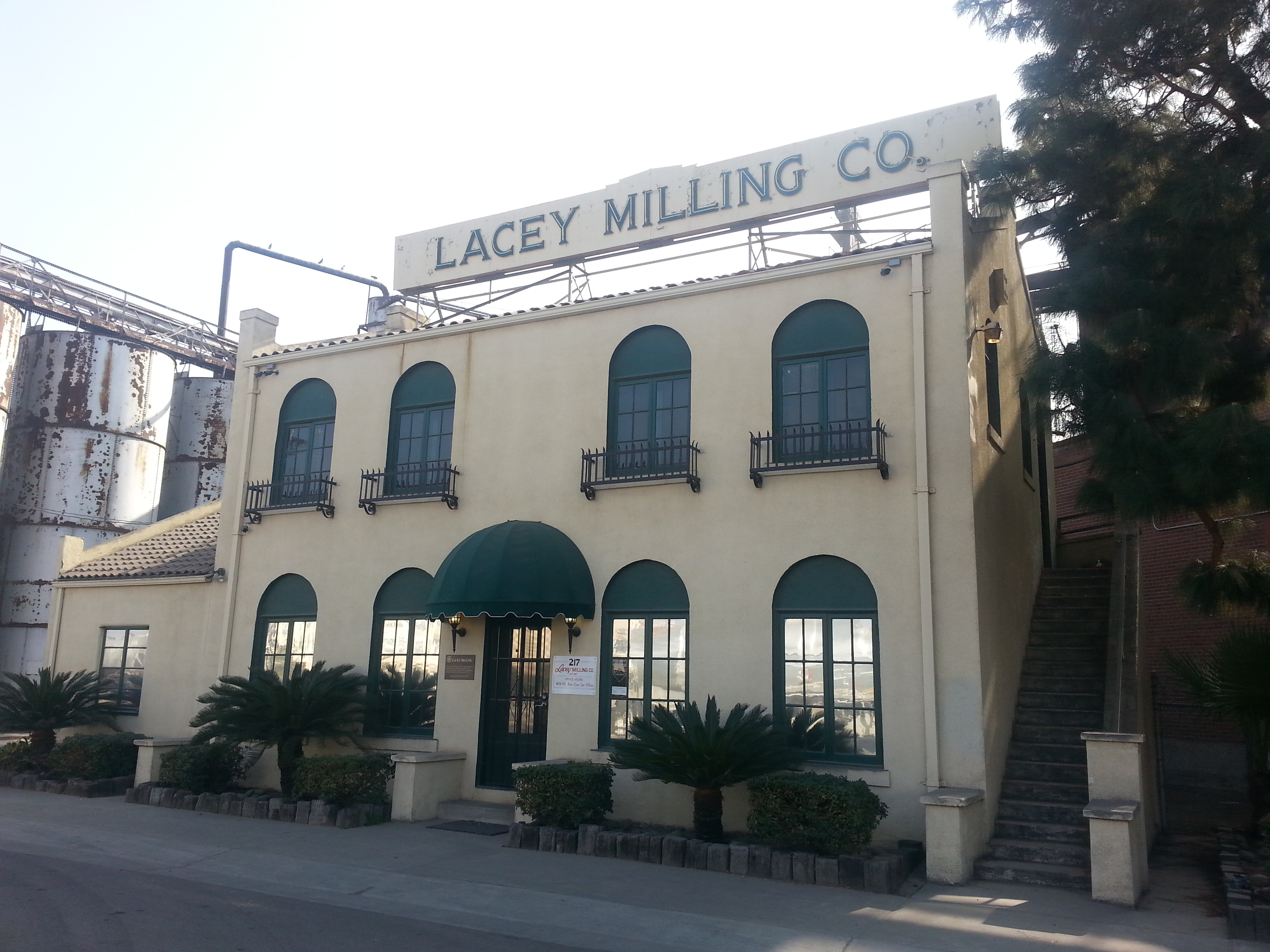
The historic Lacey Milling Co.

An electrical generating plant was built in 1891 by pioneering flour miller H.G. Lacey, bringing the first electric lights to the city. The Lacey Milling Company, founded in 1887, was operated by Lacey and his descendants for 136 years before shutting down in 2023.

The first public high school, Hanford Union High School, was started in 1892 with one teacher, W. S. Cranmer, and an average enrollment of fourteen.

When Kings County was created in 1893 from the western part of Tulare County, Hanford became its county seat.

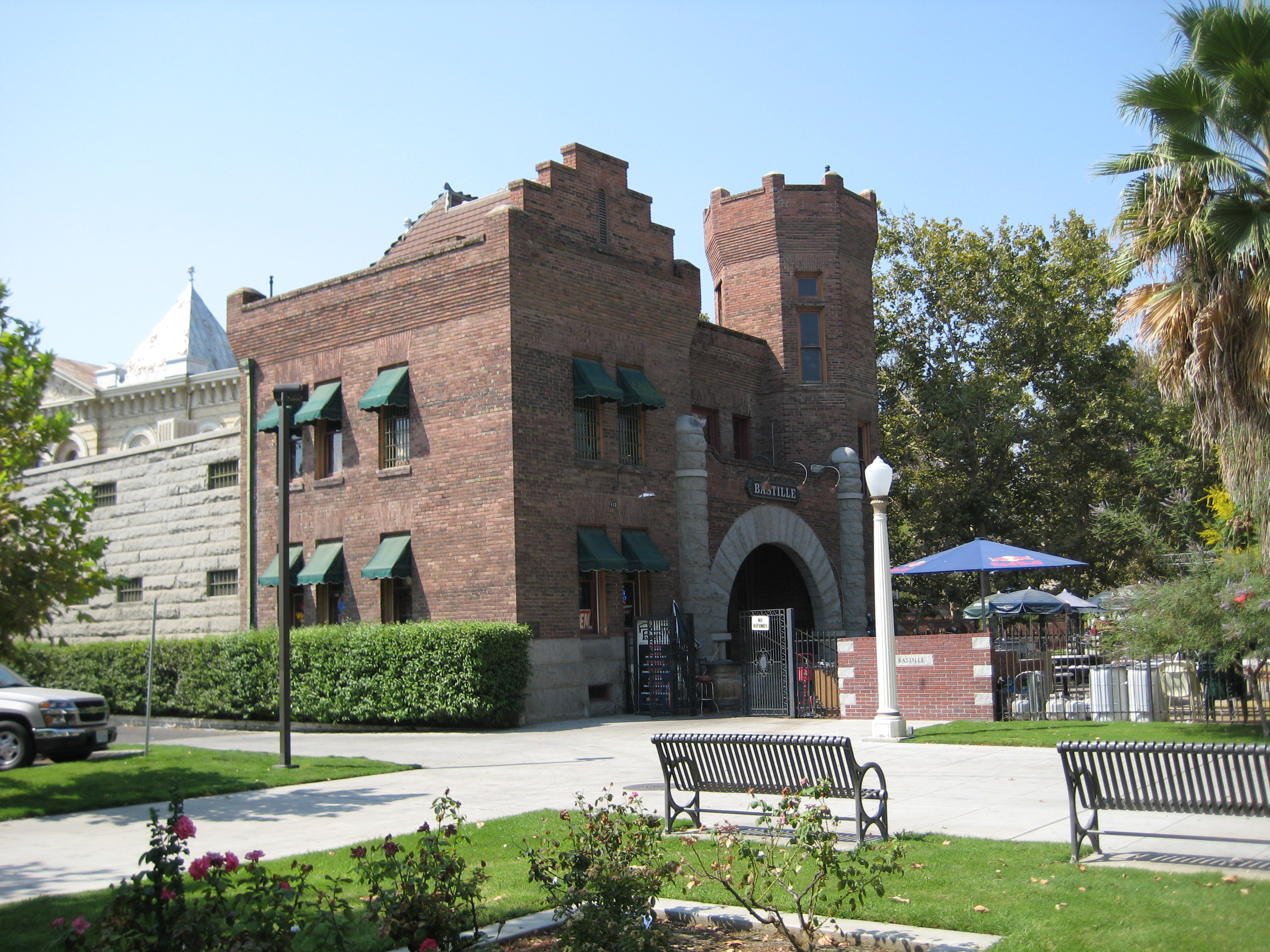
The Bastille, built in 1897.

A second railroad was laid through Hanford in 1897, which today is the main north–south line of the BNSF Railway through the San Joaquin Valley. The original east–west Southern Pacific Railroad branch line is now operated by the San Joaquin Valley Railroad.

Saloons flourished in Hanford's early days despite an anti-saloon movement until the town voted to become "dry" in 1912, eight years before nationwide prohibition was enacted.

In the 1930s, famed pilot Amelia Earhart lived in Hanford to teach flying lessons at Fresno Chandler Airport. She befriended local resident and student of hers Mary Packwood with whom she gifted a personally-designed dress and left luggage shortly before her disappearance in the Pacific Ocean in 1937. The belongings are on display in Hanford's Carnegie Museum.

== Geography ==
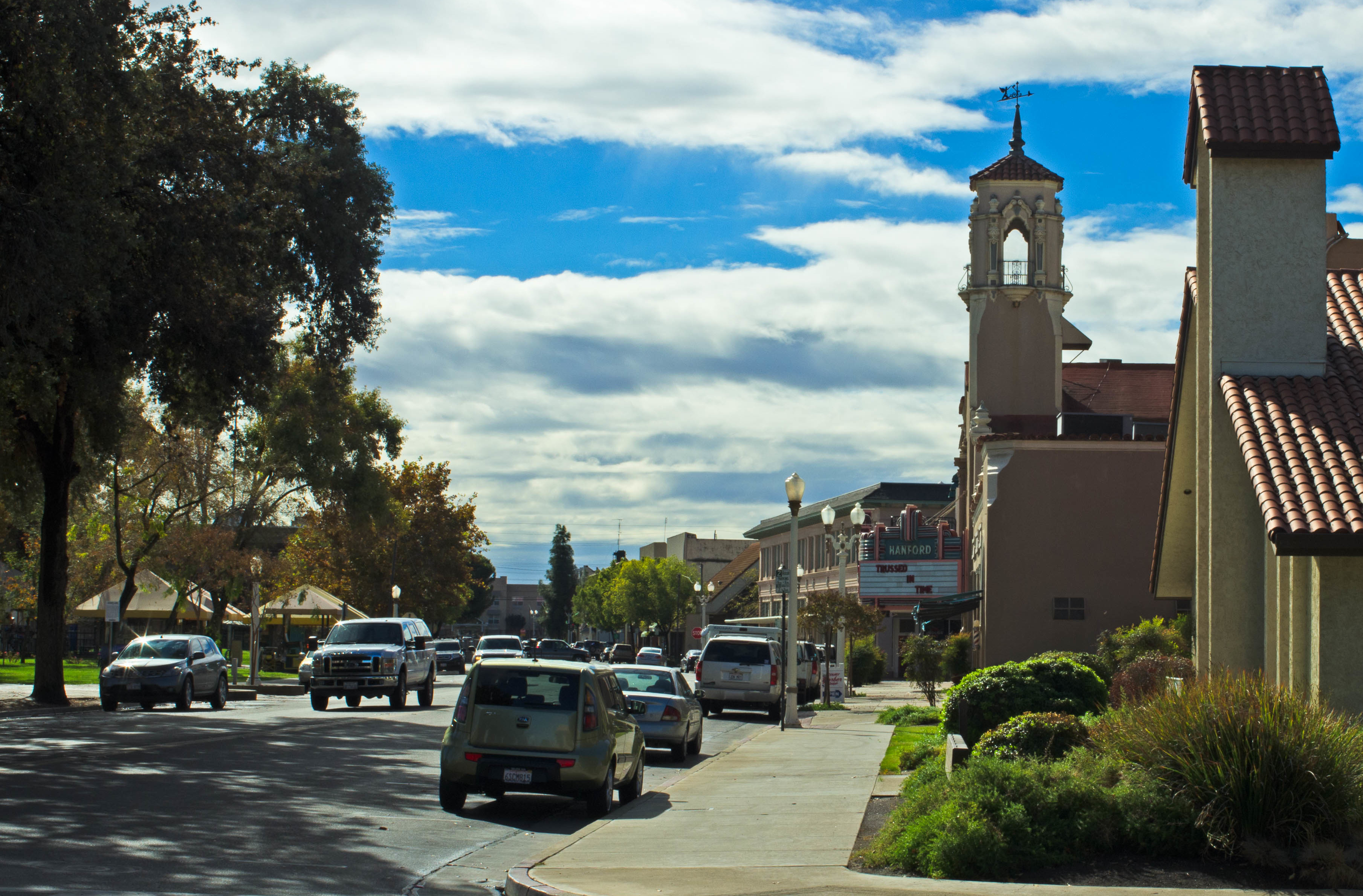
View of Downtown Hanford.

Hanford is situated in the south-central portion of California's San Joaquin Valley, 28 miles (45 km) south-southeast of the city of Fresno and 18 miles (29 km) west of the city of Visalia. The city is 249 feet (76 m) above sea level and has a flat terrain. According to the United States Census Bureau, the city has a total area of 17.4 square miles (45 km^{2}), all land. The only natural watercourse is Mussel Slough, remnants of which still exist on the city's western edge. The Kings River is about 6.5 miles (10.5 km) north of Hanford. The People's Ditch, an irrigation canal dug in the 1870s, traverses Hanford from north to south. Hanford's land was once a drainage basin for Tulare Lake.

=== Climate ===
Hanford has a cool semi-arid climate (Köppen BSk) typical of the San Joaquin Valley floor with sweltering, dry summers and cool winters characterized by dense tule fog. The wetter season occurs from November through March. The average annual rainfall over the ten years from 1997/98 through 2006/07 was 8.97 inches or 228 millimeters, although the wettest "rain year" from July 1968 to June 1969 totalled 17.35 inches or 440.7 millimeters and the driest from July 2013 to June 2014 only 2.82 inches or 71.6 millimeters. The wettest month has been January 1969 with 6.69 inches or 169.9 millimeters, and the wettest day February 24, 2023 with 2.70 inches or 68.6 millimeters.

Hanford falls within USDA plant hardiness zones 9a (20 to 25 °F; −6.7 to −3.9 °C) and 9b (25 to 30 °F; −3.9 to −1.1 °C). The coldest temperature on record has been 14 °F or −10 °C on January 6 and January 7, 1913.

Climate data for Hanford Municipal Airport, California (1991–2020 normals, extremes 1899–present)
| Month | Jan | Feb | Mar | Apr | May | Jun | Jul | Aug | Sep | Oct | Nov | Dec | Year |
|---|---|---|---|---|---|---|---|---|---|---|---|---|---|
| Record high °F (°C) | 95 (35) | 94 (34) | 95 (35) | 100 (38) | 107 (42) | 114 (46) | 116 (47) | 115 (46) | 114 (46) | 105 (41) | 94 (34) | 80 (27) | 116 (47) |
| Mean maximum °F (°C) | 66.8 (19.3) | 72.5 (22.5) | 81.5 (27.5) | 90.6 (32.6) | 98.3 (36.8) | 104.1 (40.1) | 105.6 (40.9) | 105.3 (40.7) | 101.6 (38.7) | 93.2 (34.0) | 79.1 (26.2) | 66.8 (19.3) | 107.4 (41.9) |
| Mean daily maximum °F (°C) | 56.6 (13.7) | 63.0 (17.2) | 69.8 (21.0) | 76.3 (24.6) | 84.6 (29.2) | 92.5 (33.6) | 98.2 (36.8) | 97.4 (36.3) | 92.1 (33.4) | 80.7 (27.1) | 66.6 (19.2) | 56.7 (13.7) | 77.9 (25.5) |
| Daily mean °F (°C) | 46.8 (8.2) | 50.9 (10.5) | 56.7 (13.7) | 61.8 (16.6) | 69.2 (20.7) | 76.0 (24.4) | 81.1 (27.3) | 79.9 (26.6) | 74.7 (23.7) | 64.6 (18.1) | 53.2 (11.8) | 46.0 (7.8) | 63.4 (17.5) |
| Mean daily minimum °F (°C) | 37.0 (2.8) | 38.9 (3.8) | 43.5 (6.4) | 47.2 (8.4) | 53.8 (12.1) | 59.5 (15.3) | 64.0 (17.8) | 62.4 (16.9) | 57.4 (14.1) | 48.5 (9.2) | 39.8 (4.3) | 35.3 (1.8) | 48.9 (9.4) |
| Mean minimum °F (°C) | 27.6 (−2.4) | 30.4 (−0.9) | 34.5 (1.4) | 37.5 (3.1) | 45.5 (7.5) | 50.5 (10.3) | 57.3 (14.1) | 55.9 (13.3) | 49.0 (9.4) | 39.2 (4.0) | 30.2 (−1.0) | 26.2 (−3.2) | 24.8 (−4.0) |
| Record low °F (°C) | 14 (−10) | 18 (−8) | 23 (−5) | 25 (−4) | 30 (−1) | 36 (2) | 44 (7) | 40 (4) | 35 (2) | 28 (−2) | 18 (−8) | 15 (−9) | 14 (−10) |
| Average precipitation inches (mm) | 1.56 (40) | 1.44 (37) | 1.49 (38) | 0.72 (18) | 0.35 (8.9) | 0.07 (1.8) | 0.02 (0.51) | 0.00 (0.00) | 0.04 (1.0) | 0.46 (12) | 0.62 (16) | 1.36 (35) | 8.13 (208.21) |
| Average precipitation days (≥ 0.01 in) | 8.3 | 8.1 | 6.8 | 4.5 | 2.5 | 0.5 | 0.2 | 0.1 | 0.5 | 2.8 | 6.7 | 8.7 | 49.7 |
Source 1: NOAA
Source 2: National Weather Service

== Demographics ==
Historical population
| Census | Pop. | Note | %± |
|---|---|---|---|
| 1880 | 269 | | — |
| 1890 | 942 | | 250.2% |
| 1900 | 2,929 | | 210.9% |
| 1910 | 4,829 | | 64.9% |
| 1920 | 5,888 | | 21.9% |
| 1930 | 7,028 | | 19.4% |
| 1940 | 8,234 | | 17.2% |
| 1950 | 10,028 | | 21.8% |
| 1960 | 10,133 | | 1.0% |
| 1970 | 15,179 | | 49.8% |
| 1980 | 20,958 | | 38.1% |
| 1990 | 30,897 | | 47.4% |
| 2000 | 41,686 | | 34.9% |
| 2010 | 53,967 | | 29.5% |
| 2020 | 57,990 | | 7.5% |
| 2024 (est.) | 60,594 | ▲ | 4.5% |
U.S. Decennial Census

=== 2020 census ===
As of the 2020 census, Hanford had a population of 57,990. The population density was 3,332.2 inhabitants per square mile (1,286.6/km^{2}). The median age was 33.4 years. The age distribution was 27.8% under 18, 9.5% aged 18 to 24, 28.2% aged 25 to 44, 21.4% aged 45 to 64, and 13.0% aged 65 or older. For every 100 females, there were 96.2 males, and for every 100 females age 18 and over, there were 94.2 males.

The census reported that 98.2% of the population lived in households, 0.5% lived in non-institutionalized group quarters, and 1.3% were institutionalized. 99.5% of residents lived in urban areas, while 0.5% lived in rural areas.

There were 19,157 households, of which 41.6% had children under the age of 18 living in them. Of all households, 48.9% were married-couple households, 7.9% were cohabiting couple households, 16.6% had a male householder with no spouse or partner present, and 26.7% had a female householder with no spouse or partner present. About 20.6% of all households were made up of individuals and 8.9% had someone living alone who was 65 years of age or older. The average household size was 2.97. There were 14,129 families (73.8% of all households).

There were 19,851 housing units at an average density of 1,140.7 units per square mile (440.4 units/km^{2}), of which 19,157 (96.5%) were occupied. Of occupied units, 58.5% were owner-occupied and 41.5% were occupied by renters. 3.5% of housing units were vacant. The homeowner vacancy rate was 0.9%, and the rental vacancy rate was 3.4%.

Racial composition as of the 2020 census
| Race | Number | Percent |
|---|---|---|
| White | 26,410 | 45.5% |
| Black or African American | 2,746 | 4.7% |
| American Indian and Alaska Native | 1,140 | 2.0% |
| Asian | 2,475 | 4.3% |
| Native Hawaiian and Other Pacific Islander | 125 | 0.2% |
| Some other race | 14,592 | 25.2% |
| Two or more races | 10,502 | 18.1% |
| Hispanic or Latino (of any race) | 30,763 | 53.0% |

=== 2023 ACS 5-year estimates ===
In 2023, the US Census Bureau estimated that 16.3% of the population were foreign-born. Of all people aged 5 or older, 66.0% spoke only English at home, 29.2% spoke Spanish, 1.8% spoke other Indo-European languages, 2.6% spoke Asian or Pacific Islander languages, and 0.4% spoke other languages. Of those aged 25 or older, 80.9% were high school graduates and 17.8% had a bachelor's degree.

The median household income in 2023 was $73,544, and the per capita income was $31,281. About 12.8% of families and 14.9% of the population were below the poverty line.

=== 2010 census ===
The 2010 United States census reported that Hanford had a population of 53,967. The population density was 3,253.1 inhabitants per square mile (1,256.0/km^{2}). The racial makeup of Hanford was 33,713 (62.5%) White, 2,632 (4.9%) African American, 712 (1.3%) Native American, 2,322 (4.3%) Asian, 53 (0.1%) Pacific Islander, 11,599 (21.5%) from other races, and 2,936 (5.4%) from two or more races. Hispanic or Latino of any race were 25,419 persons (47.1%).

The Census reported that 53,068 people (98.3% of the population) lived in households, 283 (0.5%) lived in non-institutionalized group quarters, and 616 (1.1%) were institutionalized.

There were 17,492 households, out of which 8,053 (46.0%) had children under the age of 18 living in them, 9,088 (52.0%) were married couples living together, 2,833 (16.2%) had a female householder with no husband present, 1,207 (6.9%) had a male householder with no wife present. There were 1,315 (7.5%) unmarried partnerships, and 117 (0.7%) same-sex partnerships. 3,483 households (19.9%) were made up of individuals, and 1,405 (8.0%) had someone living alone who was 65 years of age or older. The average household size was 3.03. There were 13,128 families (75.1% of all households); the average family size was 3.49.

The population was spread out, with 16,731 people (31.0%) under the age of 18, 5,478 people (10.2%) aged 18 to 24, 14,764 people (27.4%) aged 25 to 44, 11,647 people (21.6%) aged 45 to 64, and 5,347 people (9.9%) who were 65 years of age or older. The median age was 30.9 years. For every 100 females, there were 96.3 males. For every 100 females age 18 and over, there were 93.9 males.

There were 18,493 housing units at an average density of 1,114.8 per square mile (430.4/km^{2}), of which 10,208 (58.4%) were owner-occupied, and 7,284 (41.6%) were occupied by renters. The homeowner vacancy rate was 2.4%; the rental vacancy rate was 4.6%. 31,109 people (57.6% of the population) lived in owner-occupied housing units and 21,959 people (40.7%) lived in rental housing units.

15.5% of the populace lived below the poverty line.

== Economy ==
Hanford is a major trading center serving the surrounding agricultural area. According to the California Employment Development Department, as of September 2012, most residents of the Hanford-Corcoran Metropolitan Statistical Area were employed in services (31,000 employees), government (14,400 employees) and farming (6,400 employees) as well as in some manufacturing enterprises (5,700 employees).

The heavy industry sector has declined significantly over the past 30 years. An oil refinery formerly operated in the city under several different owners (Caminol Oil Co. from 1932 to 1967, Beacon Oil Co. from 1967 to 1982 and Ultramar Oil Co. from 1982 to 1987) until it permanently closed in 1987. A tire manufacturing plant was built in 1962 by the Armstrong Rubber Co., which operated it until that company was purchased by the Italian manufacturer Pirelli, which eventually closed the factory in 2001. In August 2017, Faraday Future announced that it had signed a lease for the former Pirelli plant where it plans to manufacture electric vehicles. The company said that it could employ up to 1,300 people over time and build up to 10,000 cars a year.

Major employers within the city of Hanford in 2006 included the Kings County government with 1,041 employees, the Adventist Health with 857, the Hanford Elementary School District with 520, the Del Monte Foods tomato cannery with 435 year-round and 1,500 seasonal employees and Marquez Brothers International, Inc., makers of Hispanic cheese and other dairy products. Many Hanford residents work for other nearby employers such as NAS Lemoore, the U.S. Navy's largest Master Jet Base located 15.5 mi (24.9 km) WSW of Hanford and for the California Department of Corrections and Rehabilitation which operates three state prisons in Kings County. Additionally, the National Weather Service's San Joaquin Valley office is located in Hanford.

The city was impacted by the Great Recession (2007–09) and employment was also affected by the California drought (2012–13). The unemployment rate in January 2016 was 10.3%. However, the rate had dropped to 7.9% in February 2020 at the eve of the COVID-19 pandemic. The unemployment rate had risen to 16.0% in April of that year. According to the United States Census Bureau, median household income in Hanford was $54,767 and 18.3% of the population was living below the poverty line in 2008–2012.

== Arts and culture ==
The Spanish Colonial Revival style Hanford Fox Theatre, built 1929.

The Kings Art Center was opened in 1989 to be the premier visual arts gallery and art training center of Kings County. It hosts gallery showings throughout the year, as well as art classes for adults and children.

The Kings District Fair is a traditional county fair held on four days in mid-June at the Kings Fairgrounds. The Renaissance of Kings Cultural Arts Faire is held the first weekend of October at Courthouse Square in Hanford's city center. The event typically attracts 15,000 people over the two-day period.

The Kings Symphony Orchestra was founded in 1963 and draws musicians from throughout the central and southern San Joaquin Valley. The orchestra generally performs four times a year.

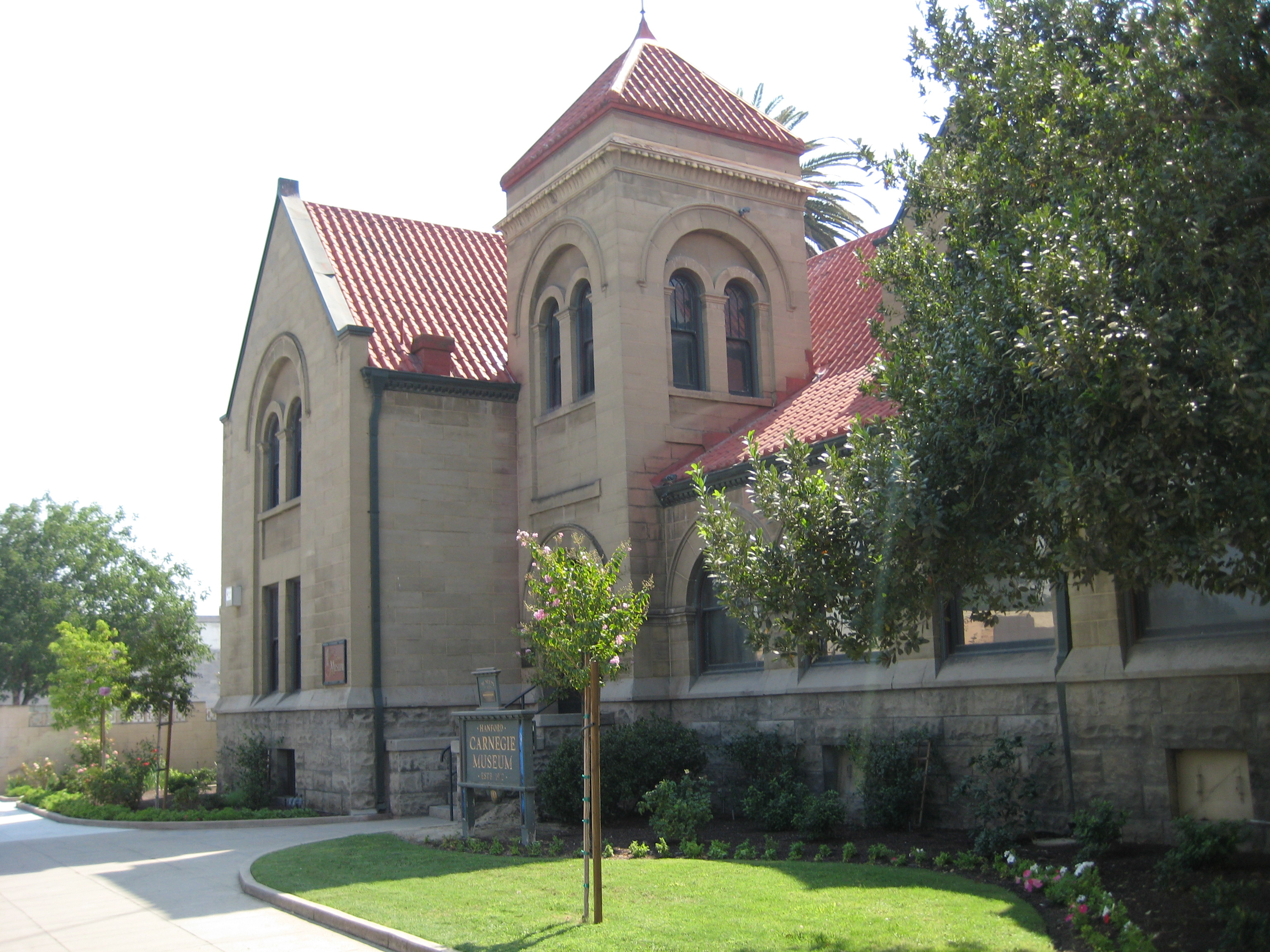
Hanford Carnegie Museum

In 1903, steel magnate and philanthropist Andrew Carnegie donated $12,500 for the construction of the Hanford Carnegie Library which opened in 1905 as one of the many Carnegie libraries. The library was replaced by a new structure at a different location in 1968. The old library was later renovated and re-opened as the Hanford Carnegie Museum in 1975.

The Kings Art Center

The former Clark Center for Japanese Art and Culture had the mission of collecting, preserving and exhibiting works of fine art, primarily the arts of Japan. The center also housed a specialist library for Japanese art and culture. The Clark Center closed permanently on June 30, 2015. The art collection was moved to the Minneapolis Institute of Arts and the bonsai collection was transferred to the Shinzen Friendship Garden at Woodward Park in Fresno, California.

Chinese immigrants that arrived in the late 19th century created a thriving Chinatown in Hanford in the neighborhood around China Alley. China Alley was the site of the famous but now closed Imperial Dynasty restaurant. Hanford's Taoist Temple (listed on the National Register of Historic Places) built in 1893 is also there. A Moon Festival is held in China Alley in early October. In July 2011, Hanford city council commissioned a study of China Alley with the hope of revitalizing it. The China Alley Preservation Society is a non profit organization dedicated to preserving and revitalizing China Alley.

== Sports ==
Hanford is the site of the Hanford Criterium bicycle races held on a Sunday in late March or early April. The 0.9-mile (1.4 km) hourglass style loop course is run on downtown streets. The Criterium is held under USA Cycling racing rules and permit.

Dirt track auto racing takes place at the Kings Speedway from March through October. The track is a 3/8-mile semi-banked clay oval and is at the Kings Fairgrounds.

== Government ==
Hanford is incorporated as a general law city under the California Constitution. The city has a council-manager government with a city manager appointed by the city council.

The city council is made up of five members elected by districts for four-year terms. There are no term limits in effect. The mayor and vice mayor are elected annually by the city council from among its members. As of 2026, the mayor is Mark Kairis. Council members include Kimber Regan, Lou Martinez, Travis Paden, and Hanford Vice Mayor Nancy Howze.

Hanford's city manager is the chief administrative officer of the city and is responsible for the overall administrative direction of the city. The city manager's duties include development and implementation of the annual budget for approval by the city council. Chris Tavarez was appointed as the city manager in 2026.

In the state legislature, Hanford is in the 16th senatorial district, represented by Democrat Melissa Hurtado, and the 33rd Assembly district, represented by Republican Alexandra Macedo. In the US House of Representatives, the north side of Hanford is represented by Republican Vince Fong, with the south side represented by Republican David Valadao.

== Education ==
Hanford has 15 elementary schools, three junior high schools, four high schools with a total of 8,464 Kindergarten through 8th grade students and 3,522 high schoolers.

The Hanford Elementary School District provides kindergarten through eighth grade education for most of the city. The Pioneer Union Elementary School District serves much of the northern part of Hanford. Part of north Hanford is served by the Kings River-Hardwick School District. The Hanford Joint Union High School District provides public secondary education. It operates Hanford Union High School, Hanford West High School, Sierra Pacific High School as well as Earl F. Johnson High School.

The College of the Sequoias operates an education center in Hanford as part of the Joint Educational Center that includes Sierra Pacific High School.

Brandman University has a Hanford campus for adult students.

== Transportation ==
Kings Area Regional Transit (KART) operates regularly scheduled fixed route bus service, vanpool service for commuters and Dial-A-Ride (demand response) services throughout Kings County as well as to Fresno. Hanford was also served by Orange Belt Stages until it ceased operations in 2020 due to the impact of the COVID-19 pandemic on tourism.

=== Rail ===
Amtrak provides passenger rail service from Hanford station to the San Francisco Bay Area and Sacramento, and service to Southern California by a combination of rail and bus. Freight service is available from both the BNSF Railway and the San Joaquin Valley Railroad.

Amtrak Thruway 18 provides a daily connection to Visalia on the east, and Santa Maria on the west, with several stops in between.

California High-Speed Rail has a station under construction to the east of Hanford, however construction only started in 2019 after a series of disputes between neighbouring Visalia, which favoured the project, and Hanford, which opposed construction altogether until the station design was changed from being at-grade to being an elevated structure east of the city.

=== Air ===
The Hanford Municipal Airport serves general aviation and has a 5,175 feet (1,577 m) paved runway.

== Utilities ==
Water

The city's water system is supplied by a network of 14 active deep wells and one standby well ranging in depth from 600 feet (180 m) to 1,700 feet (520 m) with 203 miles (327 km) of main lines and serves 15,900 water connections. Formerly, the water had contained naturally occurring arsenic in excess of the maximum contaminant level adopted by the U.S. Environmental Protection Agency. However, according to the Consumer Confidence Report issued by the city of Hanford in March 2010 for calendar year 2009, since November 2009, the city has supplied water that is below the federal standard of 10 micrograms of arsenic per liter of water. Although it does not pose a health hazard, Hanford's drinking water also naturally contains hydrogen sulfide, which caused the water to have a noticeable "rotten egg" odor. In February 2015, the city completed a project to chlorinate all of its water, to eliminate the odor.

Sanitation

The city's sanitary sewer system consists of 212 mi (341 km) of collector lines and 22 pump stations. The wastewater treatment plant treats 5,000,000 U.S. gallons (19,000,000 liters) of sewage per day. The treated effluent is used to irrigate non-food crops.

== Sister city ==
- Setana, Japan

== In creative works ==
The Lacey mill was featured as a filming location in several movies and music videos, including the 1989 film Night Shadow, starring Kato Kaelin, and the music video for John Mellencamp's "Walk Tall," starring Peter Dinklage.

== Notable people ==
- Leslie Bassett was a Pulitzer Prize-winning composer who was born in Hanford.
- Ryan Bowen was a baseball player for the Houston Astros and Florida Marlins
- Ken Caminiti was a Major League Baseball player and National League MVP
- Tyson Chandler is a basketball player in the National Basketball Association
- Chris Cohan, a Cable TV executive; former owner of the Golden State Warriors
- Calvin M. Dooley served in the U.S. House of Representatives
- Dameane Douglas was a wide receiver in the National Football League (NFL)
- Harlan F. Hagen served in the U.S. House of Representatives from 1953 to 1967.
- Jermaine Haley is a football player who was born in Hanford.
- Tyler Henry, a self-proclaimed psychic medium
- Ed Hill, songwriter and musician
- Tamara Keith, radio reporter, host and producer
- Bill Landis, baseball player on the 1967 American League Boston Red Sox
- Mark Lee was a cornerback in the National Football League
- Melinda Lira, American Idol season 5 semi-finalist.
- Pauline Lord, actress, was born in Hanford.
- Muriel Irwin MacDonald (1867-1918), journalist, editor, rancher; grew up in Hanford, where she owned a ranch and vineyard
- Ruth MacLeod, writer, born in Hanford.
- Adrian Martinez, American football quarterback in the National Football League for the San Francisco 49ers
- Chad Mendes, UFC fighter
- May Merrill Miller, an American writer best known for her novel First the Blade
- Richard C. Miller, photographer, a native of Hanford
- Lorenzo Neal, a 3-time Pro Bowl fullback in the NFL
- Scott Parker, hockey players in the NHL
- Sean Parnell, former Governor of Alaska
- Steve Perry a rock singer with the band Journey
- Slim Pickens, cowboy and actor, grew up in Hanford
- Phillip Pine, actor, born in Hanford
- Poor Man's Poison, American folk band based in Hanford
- Jessica Gao, television writer and producer, born in Hanford
- J. G. Quintel, creator of Regular Show, Close Enough, Regular Show: The Lost Tapes, and SuperMutant Magic Academy
- James Rainwater, physicist and co-winner of the 1975 Nobel Prize in Physics
- Matt Shively, actor on True Jackson, VP
- Bill Simas, pitcher for the Chicago White Sox
- Jewerl Thomas is a former professional National Football League football player
- David Valadao, elected to the U.S. House of Representatives in 2012
- Andy Vidak, State Senator
- Jan-Michael Vincent, actor, moved to Hanford with his family as a teenager
- Cornelius Warmerdam, longtime pole vault world record holder, grew up in Hanford.
- Darrell Winfield is an actor who played the Marlboro man and was born in Hanford.
- Delbert Wong (1920–2006), first judge of Chinese-American descent in the continental United States
