= Thaddeus Hanford =

American newspaper editor

Thaddeus Hanford, Jr. (1847–1892) was an American newspaper editor.

Hanford was the eldest son of Seattle pioneers Edward and Abby Hanford and the older brother of Cornelius H. Hanford. He work as an editor of the Daily Intelligencer and bought the newspaper in 1878. Later it was renamed in Seattle Post-Intelligencer.

Thaddeus Hanford died on January 29, 1892, and was buried at Lake View Cemetery, Seattle.
