= Hanford Municipal Airport =

- IATA: none; ICAO: KHJO; FAA LID: HJO

Summary
- Airport type: Public
- Owner: City of Hanford
- Location: Hanford, California
- Elevation AMSL: 244 ft (74 m)
- Coordinates: 36°19′00″N 119°37′40″W
- Interactive map of Hanford Municipal Airport

Runways
Direction	Length		Surface
Direction	ft	m	Surface
14/32	5,175	1,577	Asphalt

Statistics (2007)
- Aircraft operations: 28,500
- Based aircraft: 75
- Source: Federal Aviation Administration

Hanford Municipal Airport (ICAO: KHJO, FAA LID: HJO), formerly O18, is a mile (1.6 km) southeast of Hanford, in Kings County, California.

Most U.S. airports use the same three-letter location identifier for the FAA and IATA, but Hanford Municipal Airport is HJO to the FAA and has no IATA code.

== Facilities ==
The airport covers 132 acres (53 ha) with one asphalt runway (14/32), 75 ft × 5,175 ft (23 m × 1,577 m).

In the year ending March 29, 2007 the airport had 28,500 aircraft operations, average 78 per day, all general aviation. 75 aircraft are based at this airport: 85% single engine and 15% multi-engine.

== Other facilities ==
National Oceanic and Atmospheric Administration's National Weather Service San Joaquin Valley Weather Forecast office has been at the airport since 1995. The doppler weather radar, part of NEXRAD, serves the southern Central Valley of California counties from Merced to the north, to Kern to the south.
