= Handford =

Handford is a surname. Notable people with the surname include:

- Alick Handford (1869–1935), English cricketer
- Clive Handford (born 1937), Anglican bishop
- Frank Handford, English rugby union player
- James Handford (1890–1948), English cricketer
- Martin Handford (born 1956), English writer and illustrator
- Peter Handford (1919–2007), English audio engineer
- Phil Handford (born 1964), English footballer
- Richard Handford, British television producer
- Sanders Handford (1858–1917), English-born American cricketer

== In fiction ==
- Julius Handford, an alias for John Harmon in Dickens's Our Mutual Friend
- Mr. Handford, a character in Sesame Street

== See also ==
- Handforth (surname)
- Hanford (disambiguation)
