= Winchester, Iowa =

- Unincorporated community
- Location within Iowa
- Coordinates: 40°51′01″N 91°54′00″W
- Country: United States
- State: Iowa
- County: Van Buren
- Elevation: 751 ft (229 m)
- Time zone: UTC-6 (Central (CST))
  - Summer (DST): UTC-5 (CDT)
- Area code: 319
- GNIS feature ID: 463121

Winchester is an unincorporated community in Van Buren County, in the U.S. state of Iowa.

== History ==
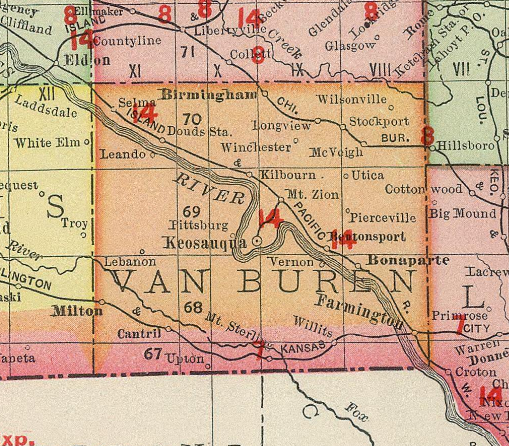
Winchester in Van Buren County Iowa in 1903

Winchester was laid out in 1840. A post office was established at Winchester in 1840, and remained in operation until it was discontinued in 1903.
