= Jamie Hanford =

American lacrosse player (born 1975)

Personal information
- Nationality: American
- Born: May 25, 1975 (age 51) Darien, Connecticut, U.S.
- Height: 6 ft 2 in (188 cm)
- Weight: 225 lb (102 kg; 16 st 1 lb)

Sport
- Position: Defenseman/Faceoff
- Shoots: Right
- NLL draft: 6th overall, 1998; Philadelphia Wings
- NLL team Former teams: Rochester Knighthawks; New York Titans; Colorado Mammoth; New Jersey Storm; Philadelphia Wings
- MLL teams: Boston Cannons; New Jersey Pride; Baltimore Bayhawks; Bridgeport Barrage
- Pro career: 1999–

Jamie Hanford (born May 25, 1975) is an American lacrosse player who plays for the Rochester Knighthawks in the National Lacrosse League. Known as a face-off specialist, he was acquired by the Titans as a free agent after playing five seasons with the Colorado Mammoth.

Hanford, named an All-American three times while at Loyola College in Maryland, was selected in the First Round (sixth overall) in the 1998 NLL entry draft.

Hanford has also played in the outdoor Major League Lacrosse.

== Statistics ==
=== NLL ===
		Regular Season						Playoffs
Season	Team	GP	G	A	Pts	LB	PIM	GP	G	A	Pts	LB	PIM
1999	Philadelphia	10	0	5	5	19	29	1	0	0	0	0	0
2000	Philadelphia	6	0	0	0	28	22	1	0	0	0	8	4
2001	Philadelphia	14	1	8	9	44	62	14	2	0	0	0	7
2002	New Jersey	16	7	9	16	36	51	--	--	--	--	--	--
2003	Colorado	16	1	5	6	17	80	2	1	1	2	4	18
2004	Colorado	13	3	3	6	14	87	1	0	0	0	5	3
2005	Colorado	16	0	7	7	45	63	1	0	0	0	0	5
2006	Colorado	16	0	7	7	24	73	3	0	1	1	2	7
2007	Colorado	15	2	4	6	14	72	1	0	0	0	4	5
2008	New York	16	2	2	4	65	6	1	0	0	0	1	12
2009	Rochester	1	0	0	0	6	2	0	0	0	0	0	0
NLL totals		139	16	50	66	370	489	13	1	2	3	24	61

=== MLL ===
		Regular Season							Playoffs
Season	Team	GP	G	2ptG	A	Pts	LB	PIM	GP	G	2ptG	A	Pts	LB	PIM
2001	Bridgeport	13	1	0	4	5	52	9.5	0	0	0	0	0	0	0
2002	Bridgeport	10	1	0	1	2	36	8	0	0	0	0	0	0	0
2002	Baltimore	4	1	0	0	1	15	2.5	1	0	0	0	0	0	1
2003	Baltimore	11	1	0	0	1	53	10	1	1	0	1	2	0	0
2004	Baltimore	12	1	0	0	1	26	8	1	0	0	0	0	0	1
2005	New Jersey	12	2	0	0	2	15	4	0	0	0	0	0	0	0
2006	Boston	12	0	0	0	0	13	4	1	0	0	0	0	0	0
MLL Totals		74	7	0	5	12	210	42	4	1	0	1	2	0	2
