= James Madison Hanford =

James Madison Hanford (1827–1911) was an American railroad executive. The city of Hanford, California is named after him.

Hanford was a native of New York. His parents were Stephen and Maria Hanford. He worked as paymaster for the Southern Pacific Railroad. The pay cars “started from San Francisco and were stocked with enough money to pay all the employees along the way”.

Hanford retired in 1908 after 39 years with the railroad and died at his home in Oakland, California in 1911.
