= National Register of Historic Places listings in Lassen Volcanic National Park =

This is a list of the National Register of Historic Places listings in Lassen Volcanic National Park.

This is intended to be a complete list of the properties and districts on the National Register of Historic Places in Lassen Volcanic National Park, California, United States. The locations of National Register properties and districts for which the latitude and longitude coordinates are included below, may be seen in a Google map.

There are 13 properties and districts listed on the National Register in the park.

This National Park Service list is complete through NPS recent listings posted June 20, 2025.

== Current listings ==
	Name on the Register	Image	Date listed	Location	City or town	Description
1	Drakesbad Guest Ranch	Drakesbad Guest Ranch	October 22, 2003 (#03001062)	Head of Warner Creek Valley, Lassen Volcanic National Park; 40°26′23″N 121°24′52″W	Chester	A resort outside of Chester, operating since the early 1900s on former ranch land.
2	Horseshoe Lake Ranger Station	Horseshoe Lake Ranger Station	May 5, 1978 (#78000292)	N of Chester in Lassen Volcanic National Park; 40°28′23″N 121°19′48″W	Chester	A ranger station built by the CCC in 1934. It is the only standard-plan station in the Lassen backcountry.
3	Lassen Volcanic National Park Highway Historic District	Lassen Volcanic National Park Highway Historic District	June 23, 2006 (#06000527)	NPS Route 1, CA 89; 40°30′02″N 121°30′38″W	Mineral	The main roadway of Lassen Volcanic, intentionally designed to provide for scenic tourism in the park.
4	Loomis Visitor Center, Bldg. 43	Loomis Visitor Center, Bldg. 43	February 25, 1975 (#75000177)	Lassen Volcanic National Park; 40°32′10″N 121°33′44″W	Manzanita Lake	Park property built in 1927 by Benjamin Loomis, now used as a museum.
5	Manzanita Lake Naturalist's Services Historic District	Manzanita Lake Naturalist's Services Historic District	June 23, 2006 (#06000525)	39489 CA 44; 40°32′08″N 121°33′51″W	Shingletown	A visitor services building at the northwest entrance of the park.
6	Mount Harkness Fire Lookout	Mount Harkness Fire Lookout	June 19, 2017 (#100001211)	40°18′40″N 121°18′06″W	Mineral	Fire lookout on Mount Harkness built in 1931.
7	Nobles Emigrant Trail	Nobles Emigrant Trail	October 3, 1975 (#75000222)	E of Shingletown in Lassen Volcanic National Park; 40°32′50″N 121°25′29″W	Shingletown	A portion of a historic wagon trail through the Lassen region, now designated as a hiking trail.
8	Park Headquarters, Lassen Volcanic National Park	Park Headquarters, Lassen Volcanic National Park	October 3, 1978 (#06000490)	Off CA 36; 40°20′45″N 121°36′27″W	Mineral	The headquarters of the park and formerly the visitor center. Built in 1928.
9	Prospect Peak Fire Lookout		March 30, 1978 (#78000295)	40°34′24″N 121°20′42″W	Mineral	A fire lookout built in 1912, making it one of the oldest used by the U.S. Forest Service
10	Sulphur Creek Archeological District		April 14, 1980 (#80000370)	Address restricted	Mill Creek	
11	Summit Lake Ranger Station	Summit Lake Ranger Station	April 3, 1978 (#78000296)	NE of Mineral in Lassen Volcanic National Park; 40°29′54″N 121°25′37″W	Mineral	A small wooden cabin built in 1926 along the main road.
12	Twin Lakes Fire Tool Cache		October 25, 2016 (#16000745)	40°30′46″N 121°21′47″W	Mineral vicinity	A small backcountry cabin built in 1935 to hold firefighting equipment.
13	Warner Valley Ranger Station	Warner Valley Ranger Station	April 3, 1978 (#78000364)	N of Chester in Lassen Volcanic National Park; 40°26′28″N 121°22′57″W	Chester	A wooden cabin built in 1926, the first in the newly-incorporated park.

== See also ==
- National Register of Historic Places listings in Lassen County, California
- National Register of Historic Places listings in Plumas County, California
- National Register of Historic Places listings in Shasta County, California
- National Register of Historic Places listings in Tehama County, California
- National Register of Historic Places listings in California
