= National Register of Historic Places listings in Shasta County, California =

Location of Shasta County in California

This is a list of the National Register of Historic Places listings in Shasta County, California.

This is intended to be a complete list of the properties and districts on the National Register of Historic Places in Shasta County, California, United States. Latitude and longitude coordinates are provided for many National Register properties and districts; these locations may be seen together in an online map.

There are 29 properties and districts listed on the National Register in the county.

This National Park Service list is complete through NPS recent listings posted September 4, 2026.

== Current listings ==
	Name on the Register	Image	Date listed	Location	City or town	Description
1	Benton Tract Site		November 12, 1971 (#71000197)	Address Restricted	Redding	
2	Cascade Theatre	Cascade Theatre	January 17, 2002 (#01001459)	1731 Market St. 40°34′55″N 122°23′17″W	Redding	
3	Cottonwood Historic District	Cottonwood Historic District	July 16, 1973 (#73000456)	Off US 99; 40°22′57″N 122°16′48″W	Cottonwood	
4	Cow Creek Petroglyphs		November 5, 1971 (#71000195)	Address Restricted	Millville	
5	Dersch-Taylor Petroglyphs		October 14, 1971 (#71000196)	Address Restricted	Millville	
6	French Gulch Historic District	French Gulch Historic District	March 24, 1972 (#72000257)	Along both sides of French Gulch Rd. 40°41′35″N 122°38′12″W	French Gulch	
7	Edward Frisbie House	Edward Frisbie House	March 29, 1990 (#90000550)	1246 East St. 40°35′14″N 122°23′18″W	Redding	
8	Gladstone Houses		November 29, 1995 (#95001374)	12962-12964 Cline Gulch Rd. 40°43′16″N 122°34′52″W	French Gulch	
9	Horseshoe Lake Ranger Station	Horseshoe Lake Ranger Station	May 5, 1978 (#78000292)	North of Chester in Lassen Volcanic National Park; 40°28′23″N 121°19′48″W	Chester	
10	Lake Britton Archeological District		April 14, 1975 (#75000485)	Address Restricted	Burney	
11	Lassen Volcanic National Park Highway Historic District	Lassen Volcanic National Park Highway Historic District	June 23, 2006 (#06000527)	NPS Route 1, CA 89; 40°30′02″N 121°30′38″W	Mineral	
12	Loomis Visitor Center, Bldg. 43	Loomis Visitor Center, Bldg. 43	February 25, 1975 (#75000177)	Lassen Volcanic National Park; 40°32′10″N 121°33′44″W	Manzanita Lake	
13	Lorenz Hotel	Lorenz Hotel	March 19, 2012 (#12000129)	1509 Yuba St. 40°34′58″N 122°23′31″W	Redding	
14	Manzanita Lake Naturalist's Services Historic District	Manzanita Lake Naturalist's Services Historic District	June 23, 2006 (#06000525)	39489 Highway 44; 40°32′08″N 121°33′51″W	Shingletown	
15	Nobles Emigrant Trail	Nobles Emigrant Trail	October 3, 1975 (#75000222)	East of Shingletown in Lassen Volcanic National Park; 40°32′50″N 121°25′29″W	Shingletown	Extends into Lassen County.
16	Old City Hall Building	Old City Hall Building	November 14, 1978 (#78000790)	1313 Market St. 40°35′11″N 122°23′24″W	Redding	
17	Olsen Petroglyphs		March 24, 1971 (#71000198)	Address Restricted	Redding	
18	Phillips Brothers Mill		December 2, 2002 (#02001406)	Approximately 30 miles (48 km) northeast of Redding; 40°43′22″N 121°59′06″W	Oak Run	
19	Pine Street School	Pine Street School	March 21, 1978 (#78000791)	1135 Pine St. 40°35′21″N 122°23′20″W	Redding	
20	Prospect Peak Fire Lookout		March 30, 1978 (#78000295)	Northeast of Mineral; 40°34′24″N 121°20′42″W	Mineral	
21	Reading Adobe Site	Reading Adobe Site	July 14, 1971 (#71000194)	Adobe Lane, 5 miles (8.0 km) east of the center of Cottonwood; 40°23′30″N 122°11′56″W	Cottonwood	
22	Shasta State Historic Park	Shasta State Historic Park	October 14, 1971 (#71000199)	Highway 299; 40°35′56″N 122°29′30″W	Shasta	
23	Squaw Creek Archeological Site		September 3, 1981 (#81000179)	Address Restricted	Redding	
24	Sulphur Creek Archeological District		April 14, 1980 (#80000370)	Address Restricted	Mill Creek	
25	Summit Lake Ranger Station	Summit Lake Ranger Station	April 3, 1978 (#78000296)	Northeast of Mineral in Lassen Volcanic National Park; 40°29′54″N 121°25′37″W	Mineral	
26	Swasey Discontiguous Archeological District		March 12, 2003 (#03000115)	Address Restricted	Redding	
27	Tower House District	Tower House District	July 2, 1973 (#73000257)	Whiskeytown National Recreation Area; 40°39′46″N 122°38′05″W	Whiskeytown	
28	Tower House-Soo-Yeh-Choo-Pus		November 4, 1985 (#85003483)	Address Restricted	French Gulch	
29	Twin Lakes Fire Tool Cache		October 25, 2016 (#16000745)	Lassen Volcanic National Park; 40°30′46″N 121°21′47″W	Mineral vicinity	

== See also ==
- List of National Historic Landmarks in California
- National Register of Historic Places listings in California
- California Historical Landmarks in Shasta County, California
