= National Register of Historic Places listings in Plumas County, California =

Location of Plumas County in California

This is a list of the National Register of Historic Places listings in Plumas County, California.

This is intended to be a complete list of the properties and districts on the National Register of Historic Places in Plumas County, California, United States. Latitude and longitude coordinates are provided for many National Register properties and districts; these locations may be seen together in an online map.

There are 6 properties and districts listed on the National Register in the county.

This National Park Service list is complete through NPS recent listings posted September 4, 2026.

== Current listings ==
	Name on the Register	Image	Date listed	Location	City or town	Description
1	Ch'ichu'yam-bam		September 25, 2003 (#03000963)	Address Restricted	Crescent Mills	
2	Drakesbad Guest Ranch	Drakesbad Guest Ranch	October 22, 2003 (#03001062)	Head of Warner Creek Valley, Lassen Volcanic National Park; 40°26′23″N 121°24′52″W	Chester	
3	Lakes Basin Petroglyphs		May 6, 1971 (#71000172)	Address Restricted	Gold Lake	
4	Mount Harkness Fire Lookout	Mount Harkness Fire Lookout	June 19, 2017 (#100001211)	Lassen Volcanic National Park; 40°25′52″N 121°18′06″W	Mineral	
5	Plumas-Eureka Mill, Jamison Mines District	Plumas-Eureka Mill, Jamison Mines District	July 16, 1973 (#73000421)	W of Blairsden off Alt. U.S. 40 in Plumas-Eureka State Park; 39°44′56″N 120°43′09″W	Blairsden	
6	Warner Valley Ranger Station	Warner Valley Ranger Station	April 3, 1978 (#78000364)	North of Chester in Lassen Volcanic National Park; 40°26′28″N 121°22′57″W	Chester	

== See also ==
- List of National Historic Landmarks in California
- National Register of Historic Places listings in California
- California Historical Landmarks in Plumas County, California
