= Edward Frisbie House =

Edward Frisbie House may refer to:

- Edward Frisbie House (Redding, California), listed on the National Register of Historic Places in Shasta County, California
- Edward Frisbie House (Branford, Connecticut), listed on the National Register of Historic Places in New Haven County, Connecticut
- Edward Frisbie Homestead, Branford, Connecticut, listed on the National Register of Historic Places in New Haven County, Connecticut
