= National Register of Historic Places listings in Tehama County, California =

Location of Tehama County in California

This is a list of the National Register of Historic Places listings in Tehama County, California.

This is intended to be a complete list of the properties and districts on the National Register of Historic Places in Tehama County, California, United States. Latitude and longitude coordinates are provided for many National Register properties and districts; these locations may be seen together in a Google map.

There are 10 properties and districts listed on the National Register in the county.

This National Park Service list is complete through NPS recent listings posted September 4, 2026.

== Current listings ==
| | Name on the Register | Image | Date listed | Location | City or town | Description |
|---|---|---|---|---|---|---|
| 1 | Cone and Kimball Building | Cone and Kimball Building | June 26, 1979 (#79000564) | 747 Main St. 40°10′42″N 122°14′05″W | Red Bluff | Destroyed by fire in 1984. |
| 2 | Herbert Kraft Memorial Free Library | Herbert Kraft Memorial Free Library | April 14, 2000 (#00000362) | 909 Jefferson; 40°10′43″N 122°14′16″W | Red Bluff | |
| 3 | Maywood Woman's Club | Maywood Woman's Club | October 2, 1992 (#92001301) | 902 Marin St. 39°55′38″N 122°10′34″W | Corning | |
| 4 | Molino Lodge Building | Molino Lodge Building | June 6, 1980 (#80000874) | 3rd and C Sts. 40°01′39″N 122°06′43″W | Tehama | Masonic lodge building |
| 5 | Odd Fellows Building | Odd Fellows Building | December 12, 1976 (#76000537) | 342 Oak St. 40°10′36″N 122°14′03″W | Red Bluff | |
| 6 | Old Bank of America Building | Old Bank of America Building | July 28, 1980 (#80000873) | 710 Main St. 40°10′41″N 122°14′02″W | Red Bluff | |
| 7 | Park Headquarters, Lassen Volcanic National Park | Park Headquarters, Lassen Volcanic National Park | October 3, 1978 (#06000490) | Off CA 36; 40°20′45″N 121°36′27″W | Mineral | |
| 8 | Saint Mary's Parish | Saint Mary's Parish | February 4, 1982 (#82002278) | 515 Main St. 40°10′32″N 122°13′58″W | Red Bluff | |
| 9 | State Theatre | State Theatre | April 17, 2002 (#02000372) | 333 Oak St. 40°10′35″N 122°14′03″W | Red Bluff | |
| 10 | Sulphur Creek Archeological District | | April 14, 1980 (#80000370) | Address Restricted | Mill Creek | |

== See also ==
- List of National Historic Landmarks in California
- National Register of Historic Places listings in California
- California Historical Landmarks in Tehama County, California
