= National Park Highway =

National Park Highway may refer to the following:

- National Park to Park Highway, an early route forming a loop to national parks in the western United States
  - U.S. Route 89 which follows parts of the historical route and sometimes referred to as National Park Highway
- National Park Highway (Washington), a state highway in the area around Mount Rainier, Washington, U.S.
- A highway in a National Park

== See also ==
- Lassen Volcanic National Park Highway Historic District, the main roadway within Lassen Volcanic National Park in northern California, U.S.
