= Warner Valley Ranger Station =

- U.S. National Register of Historic Places
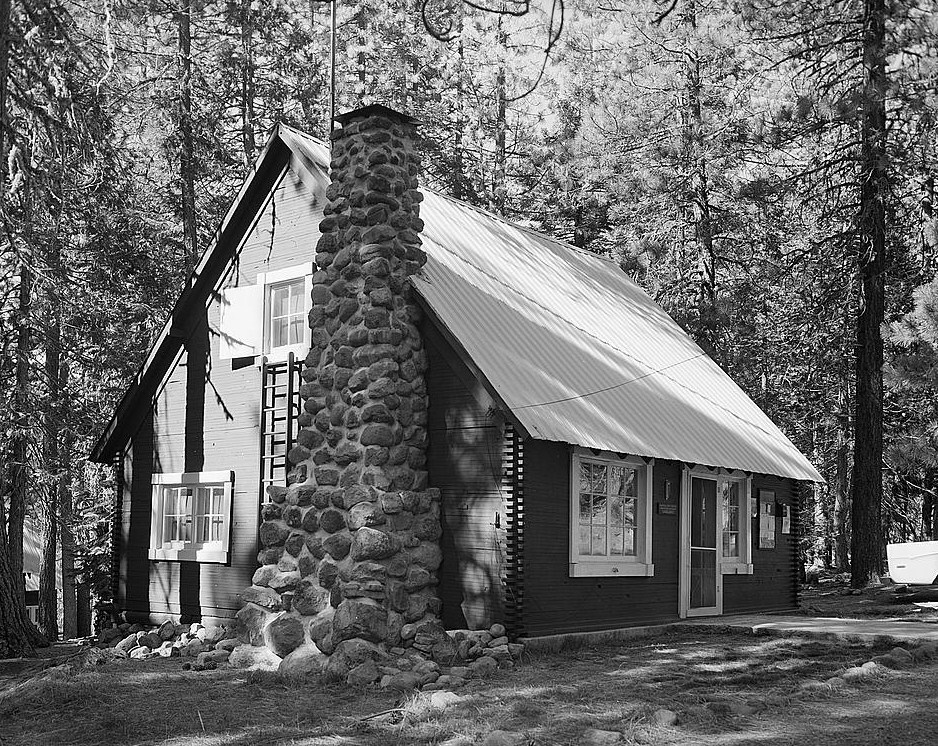
- Warner Valley Ranger Residence

- Location within California Location within the United States
- Nearest city: Chester, California
- Coordinates: 40°26′27.55″N 121°22′57.36″W
- Built: 1926
- Architect: National Park Service
- Architectural style: Rustic
- NRHP reference No.: 78000364
- Added to NRHP: April 3, 1978

The Warner Valley Ranger Station, also known as the Warner Valley Patrol Cabin and Quarters 304, is located in the southern portion of Lassen Volcanic National Park, on the access road to the Drakesbad Guest Ranch. Built in 1926, it is unusual in its choice of construction method. While it resembles a log cabin, it was built using stacked milled 2x6 lumber to form the walls. It is the only such building known to have been built in this manner in the western regions of the National Park Service system. The interlocking boards extend past each other at the corners, forming a decorative detail.

The ranger station was one of the first three building to be constructed in the park by the Park Service after the park's 1916 establishment. The other two buildings were the Summit Lake Ranger Station, also listed on the National Register of Historic Places, and the now-demolished Butte Lake Ranger Station.

== Description ==
The ranger station is a 1-1/2-story structure, measuring about 24 feet (7.3 m) square. The interior features a large living room measuring 24 feet (7.3 m) by 12 feet (3.7 m), with a stone fireplace. The other two downstairs rooms are a kitchen and a bedroom. There are two rooms in the attic. The steep roof is sheathed with cedar shingles, painted green. The building failed under heavy snow loading the year it was built and was substantially rebuilt in 1927. A renovation in 1999 addressed structural problems arising from the unique construction method, bringing the cabin up to current earthquake code requirements and adding a bathroom in a shed-roofed addition to the rear. Investigation at the time uncovered evidence of a former front porch.

== Historic designation ==
The Warner Valley Ranger Station was listed on the National Register of Historic Places on April 3, 1978.
