= National Register of Historic Places listings in Madera County, California =

Location of Madera County in California

This is a list of the National Register of Historic Places listings in Madera County, California.

This is intended to be a complete list of the properties and districts on the National Register of Historic Places in Madera County, California, United States. Latitude and longitude coordinates are provided for many National Register properties and districts; these locations may be seen together in an online map.

There are 4 properties and districts listed on the National Register in the county.

This National Park Service list is complete through NPS recent listings posted September 4, 2026.

== Current listings ==
	Name on the Register	Image	Date listed	Location	City or town	Description
1	Buck Camp Patrol Cabin	Buck Camp Patrol Cabin	July 18, 2014 (#14000406)	Jct. of Buck Cr. & Buck Camp Tr. 37°33′47″N 119°29′23″W	Yosemite National Park	
2	Devils Postpile Cabin Site		July 18, 2016 (#16000473)	Address Restricted	Devils Postpile National Monument	
3	Devils Postpile National Monument Ranger Cabin	Devils Postpile National Monument Ranger Cabin	December 8, 2015 (#15000859)	Minaret Summit Rd. 37°37′49″N 119°05′05″W	Devils Postpile National Monument	
4	Madera County Courthouse	Madera County Courthouse	September 3, 1971 (#71000162)	210 W. Yosemite Ave. 36°57′34″N 120°03′39″W	Madera	

== See also ==
- List of National Historic Landmarks in California
- National Register of Historic Places listings in California
- California Historical Landmarks in Madera County, California
