= California Historical Landmarks in Madera County =

This list includes properties and districts listed on the California Historical Landmark listing in Madera County, California. Click the "Map of all coordinates" link to the right to view a Google map of all properties and districts with latitude and longitude coordinates in the table below.

Image		Landmark name	Location	City or town	Summary
Wassama Round House	1001	Wassama Round House	Wassama Round House State Historic Park; 37°22′28″N 119°43′19″W	Oakhurst	

== See also ==
- List of California Historical Landmarks
- National Register of Historic Places listings in Madera County, California
