= French Gulch Historic District =

Historic district in California, United States

- U.S. National Register of Historic Places
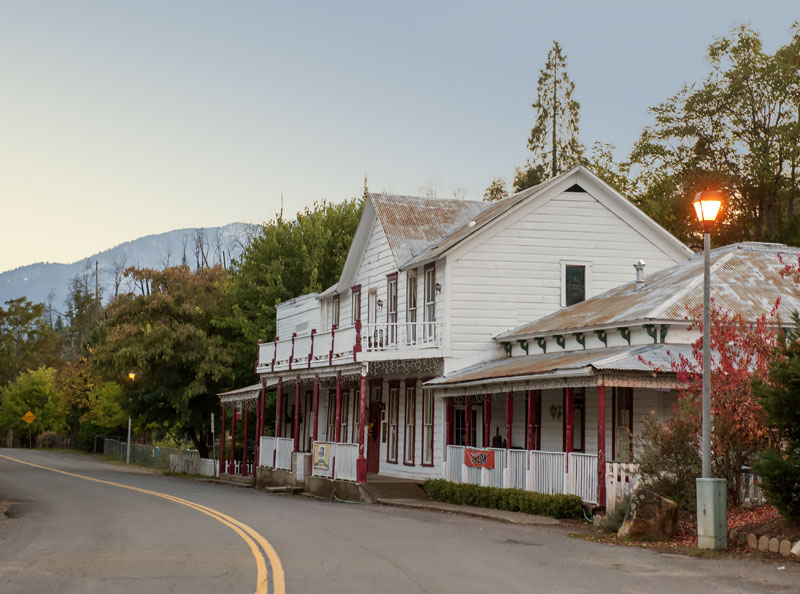

- Location within California
- Location: Along both sides of Main St. (French Gulch Rd.), French Gulch, California
- Coordinates: 40.699463°N 122.638920°W
- Area: 180 acres (0.73 km^{2})
- NRHP reference No.: 72000257
- Added to NRHP: March 24, 1972

The French Gulch Historic District, in French Gulch, California in northern California, is a historic district which was placed on the National Register of Historic Places in 1972. The listing included nine contributing buildings and two contributing sites on 180 acres (0.73 km^{2}).

It runs along both sides of Main St. (which has also been referred to as French Gulch Rd.) through a historic mining town.

It includes:

- Saint Anne's Catholic Church (c.1900). Wood frame, with bell-tower/steeple. Likely was demolished by 2011; probably was located at 40.697842°N 122.638036°W
- Feeny Hotel (1887), still in operation in 1970 as "French Gulch Hotel", at 40.699463°N 122.638920°W
- Franck's Store (1867), stone building of store founded 1854; owner's descendants still operated it in 1970.
- Franck Residence (c.1860s), west side of Main St. One-story wood-frame house.
- I.O.O.F. Hall (c.1860s), west side of Main St., of chapter founded 1858. Likely was demolished by 2011.
- Gartland Cabin (c.1856). Oldest surviving building in French Gulch.
- Commercial buildings and residences within a large north–south oriented rectangle 1,750 by 4,000 feet (530 m × 1,220 m) encompassing both sides of Main St.

== See also ==
- Gladstone Houses, about 3.5 miles to the northeast, up Cline Gulch Rd., homes of mine owner
