= National Register of Historic Places listings in California =

Buildings, sites, districts, and objects in California listed on the National Register of Historic Places:

There are more than 2,800 properties and districts listed on the National Register of Historic Places in the 58 counties of California, including 145 designated as National Historic Landmarks.

Contents: NRHP lists by county
Alameda - Alpine - Amador - Butte - Calaveras - Colusa - Contra Costa - Del Norte - El Dorado - Fresno - Glenn - Humboldt - Imperial - Inyo - Kern - Kings - Lake - Lassen - Los Angeles: (city) - (Pasadena) - (remainder of county) - Madera - Marin - Mariposa - Mendocino - Merced - Modoc - Mono - Monterey - Napa - Nevada - Orange - Placer - Plumas - Riverside - Sacramento - San Benito - San Bernardino - San Diego - San Francisco - San Joaquin - San Luis Obispo - San Mateo - Santa Barbara - Santa Clara - Santa Cruz - Shasta - Sierra - Siskiyou - Solano - Sonoma - Stanislaus - Sutter - Tehama - Trinity - Tulare - Tuolumne - Ventura - Yolo - Yuba

== Numbers of properties and districts by county ==
The following are approximate tallies of current listings in California on the National Register of Historic Places. These counts are based on entries in the National Register Information Database as of April 24, 2008, and new weekly listings posted since then on the National Register of Historic Places web site. There are frequent additions to the listings and occasional delistings and the counts here are not official. Also, the counts in this table exclude boundary increase and decrease listings which modify the area covered by an existing property or district and which carry a separate National Register reference number.

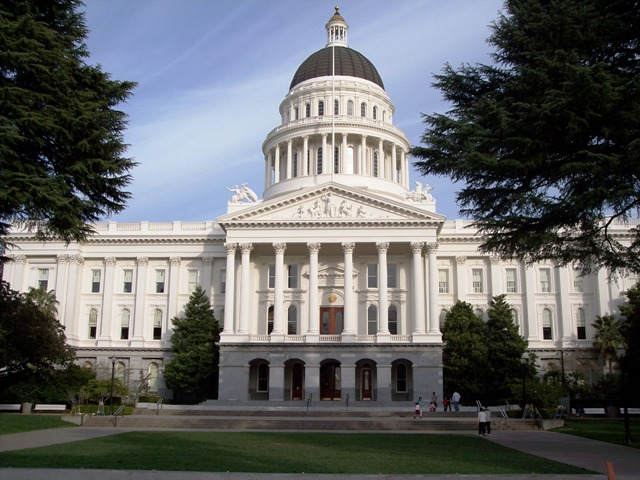
California State Capitol, Sacramento

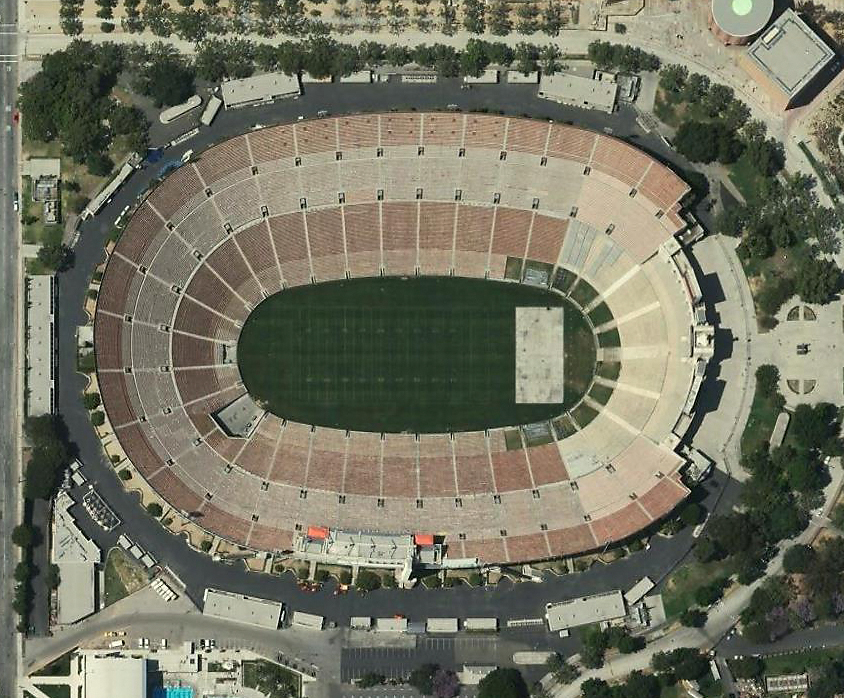
Los Angeles Memorial Coliseum

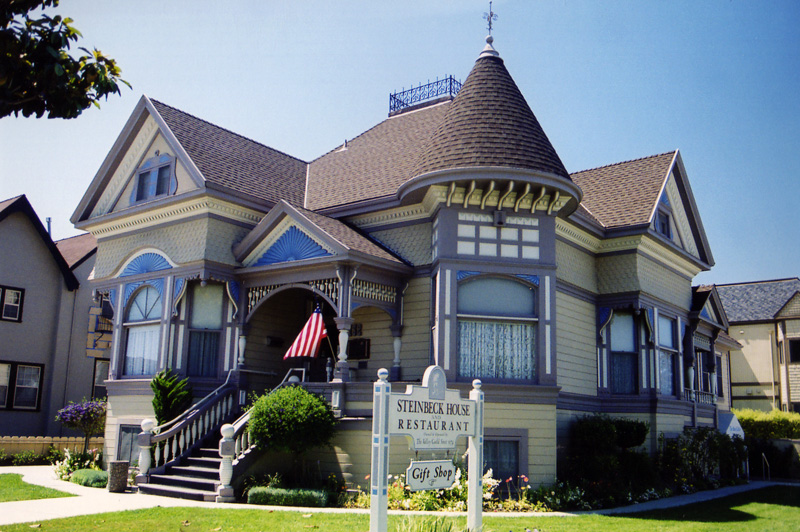
John Steinbeck House, Salinas

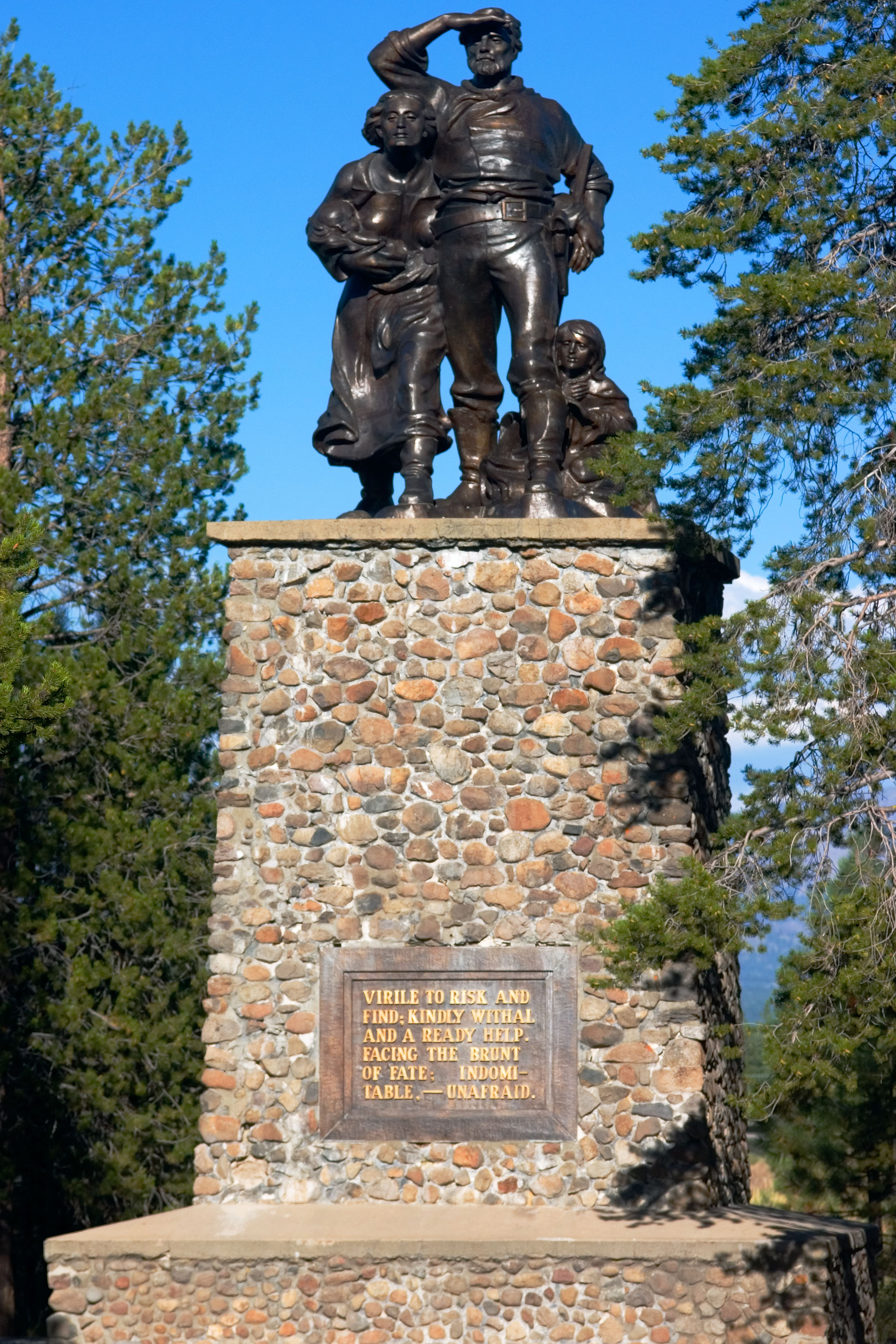
Donner Camp, Truckee

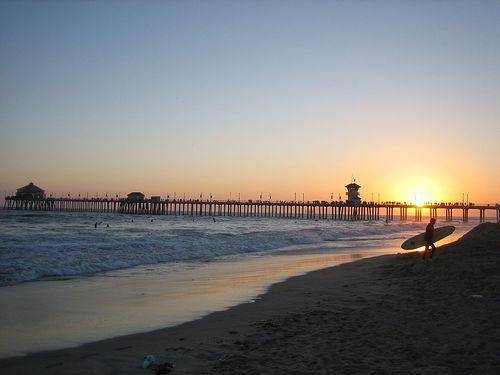
Huntington Beach Municipal Pier

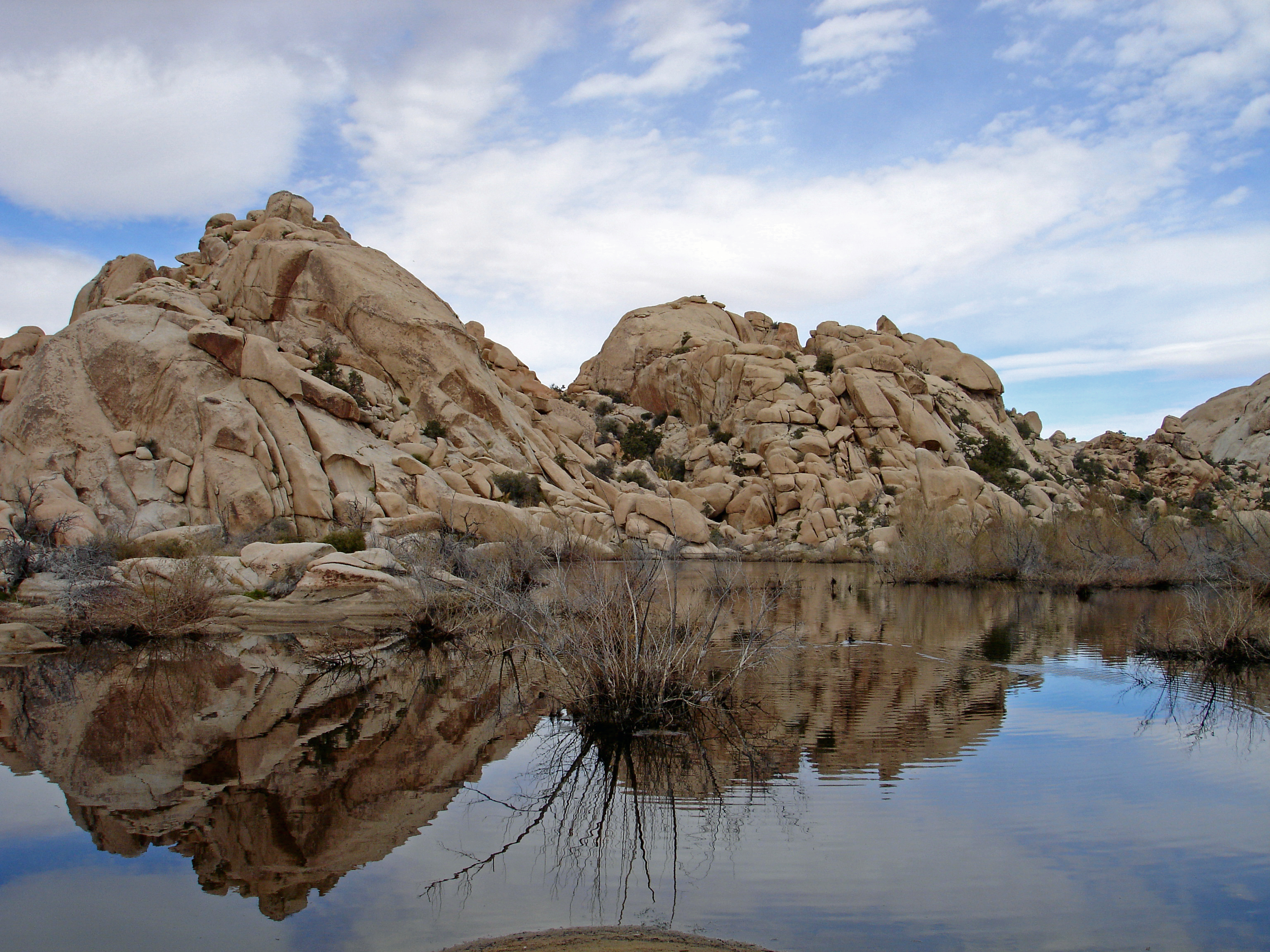
Barker Dam, Twentynine Palms

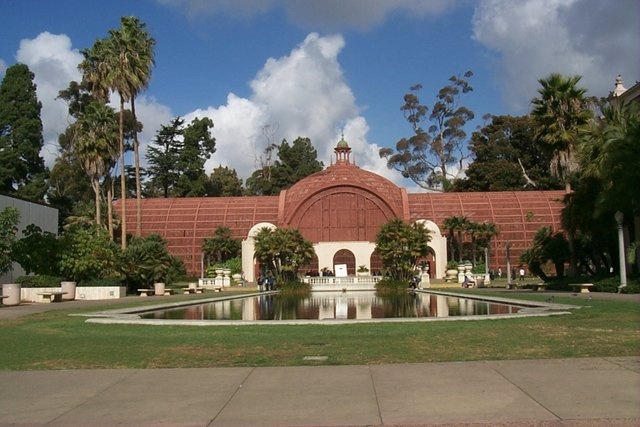
Balboa Park, San Diego

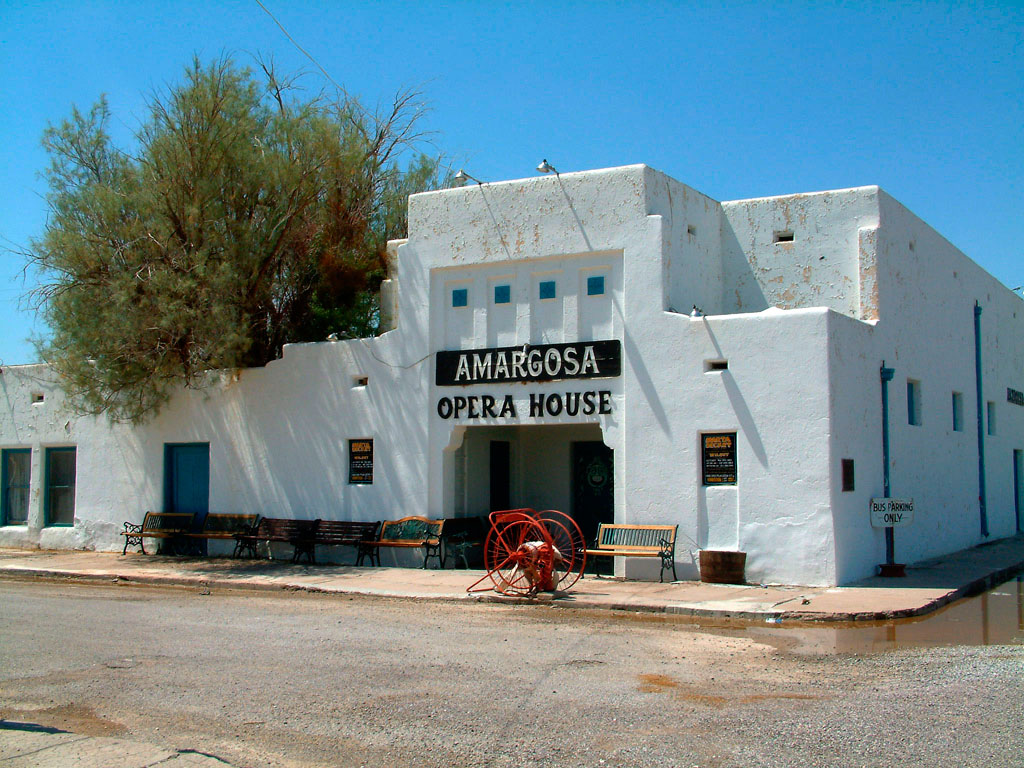
Amargosa Opera House and Hotel, Death Valley Junction Historic District

| | County | # of Sites |
|---|---|---|
| 1 | Alameda | 164 |
| 2 | Alpine | 2 |
| 3 | Amador | 22 |
| 4 | Butte | 29 |
| 5 | Calaveras | 17 |
| 6 | Colusa | 6 |
| 7 | Contra Costa | 49 |
| 8 | Del Norte | 14 |
| 9 | El Dorado | 23 |
| 10 | Fresno | 45 |
| 11 | Glenn | 3 |
| 12 | Humboldt | 58 |
| 13 | Imperial | 12 |
| 14 | Inyo | 19 |
| 15 | Kern | 27 |
| 16 | Kings | 4 |
| 17 | Lake | 7 |
| 18 | Lassen | 7 |
| 19.1 | Los Angeles: Los Angeles (city) | 291 |
| 19.2 | Los Angeles: Pasadena | 130 |
| 19.3 | Los Angeles: Other | 203 |
| | Los Angeles: Duplicates | (2) |
| | Los Angeles: Total | 621 |
| 20 | Madera | 4 |
| 21 | Marin | 55 |
| 22 | Mariposa | 45 |
| 23 | Mendocino | 45 |
| 24 | Merced | 16 |
| 25 | Modoc | 18 |
| 26 | Mono | 5 |
| 27 | Monterey | 64 |
| 28 | Napa | 88 |
| 29 | Nevada | 25 |
| 30 | Orange | 135 |
| 31 | Placer | 36 |
| 32 | Plumas | 6 |
| 33 | Riverside | 104 |
| 34 | Sacramento | 115 |
| 35 | San Benito | 15 |
| 36 | San Bernardino | 115 |
| 37 | San Diego | 164 |
| 38 | San Francisco | 211 |
| 39 | San Joaquin | 36 |
| 40 | San Luis Obispo | 38 |
| 41 | San Mateo | 65 |
| 42 | Santa Barbara | 52 |
| 43 | Santa Clara | 120 |
| 44 | Santa Cruz | 46 |
| 45 | Shasta | 29 |
| 46 | Sierra | 15 |
| 47 | Siskiyou | 21 |
| 48 | Solano | 33 |
| 49 | Sonoma | 79 |
| 50 | Stanislaus | 24 |
| 51 | Sutter | 3 |
| 52 | Tehama | 10 |
| 53 | Trinity | 5 |
| 54 | Tulare | 37 |
| 55 | Tuolumne | 37 |
| 56 | Ventura | 43 |
| 57 | Yolo | 26 |
| 58 | Yuba | 11 |
| (duplicates) | | (14) |
| Total: | | 3,112 |

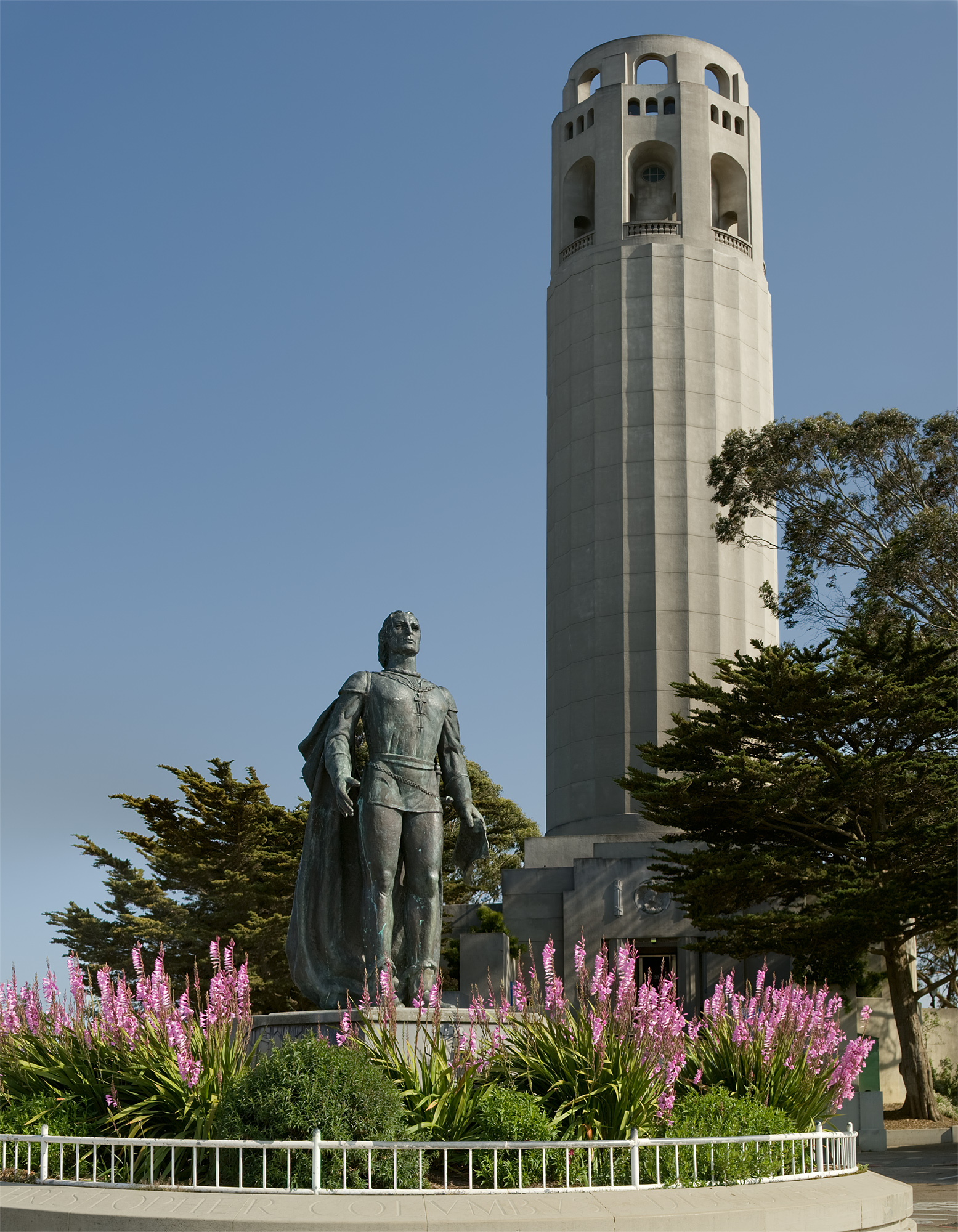
Coit Memorial Tower, San Francisco

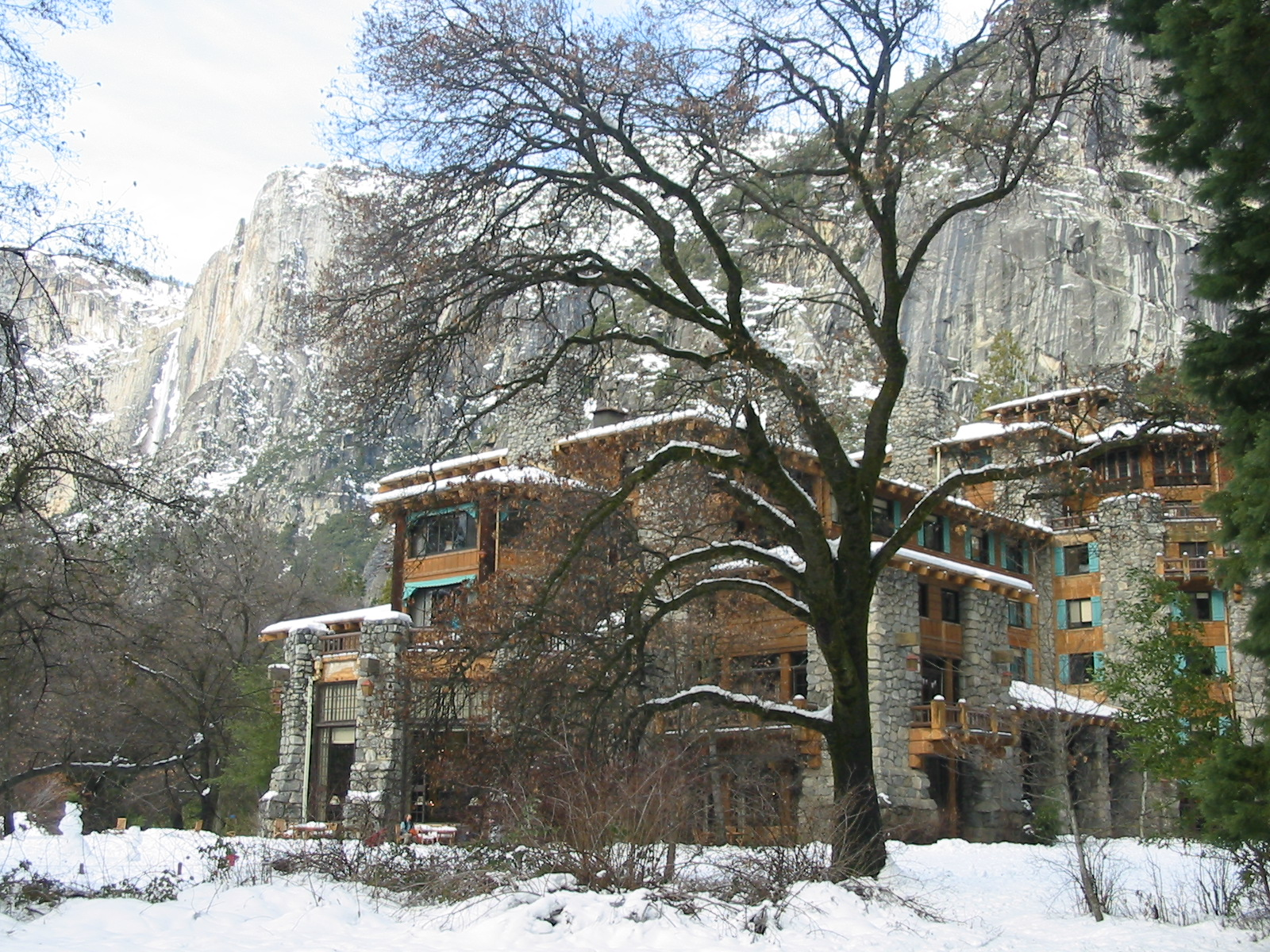
Ahwahnee Hotel, Yosemite National Park

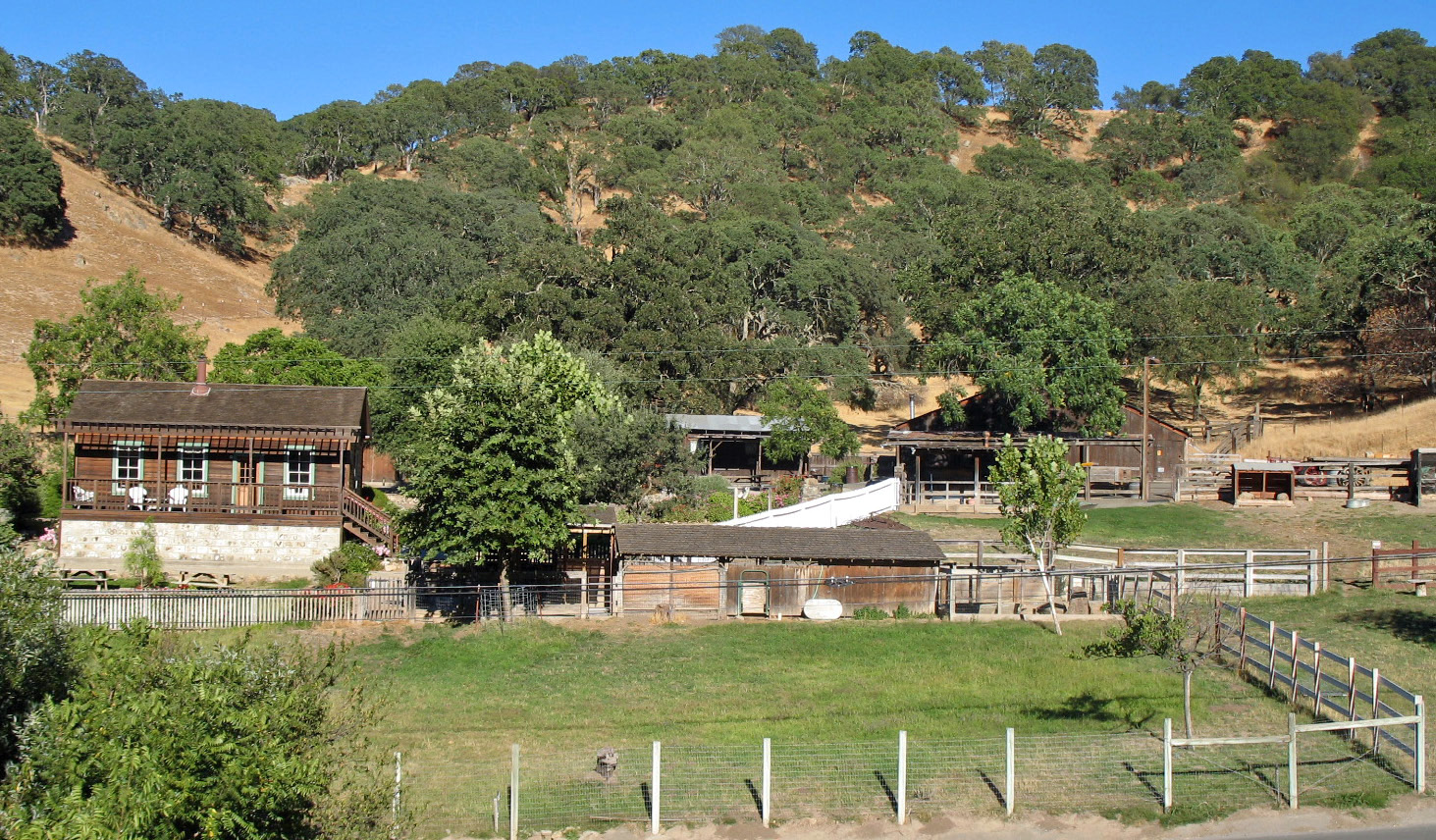
Old Borges Ranch, Walnut Creek

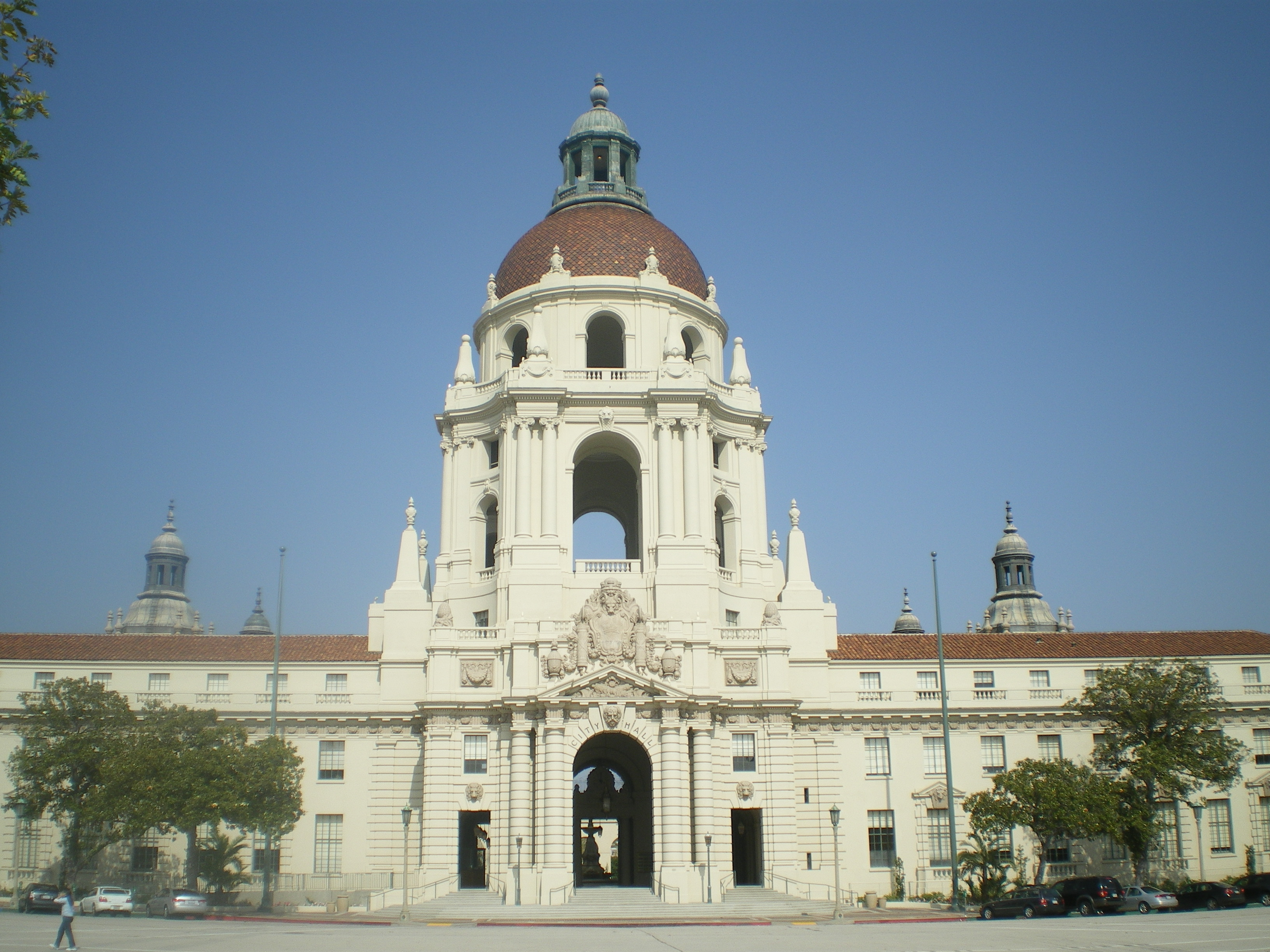
Pasadena Civic Center District

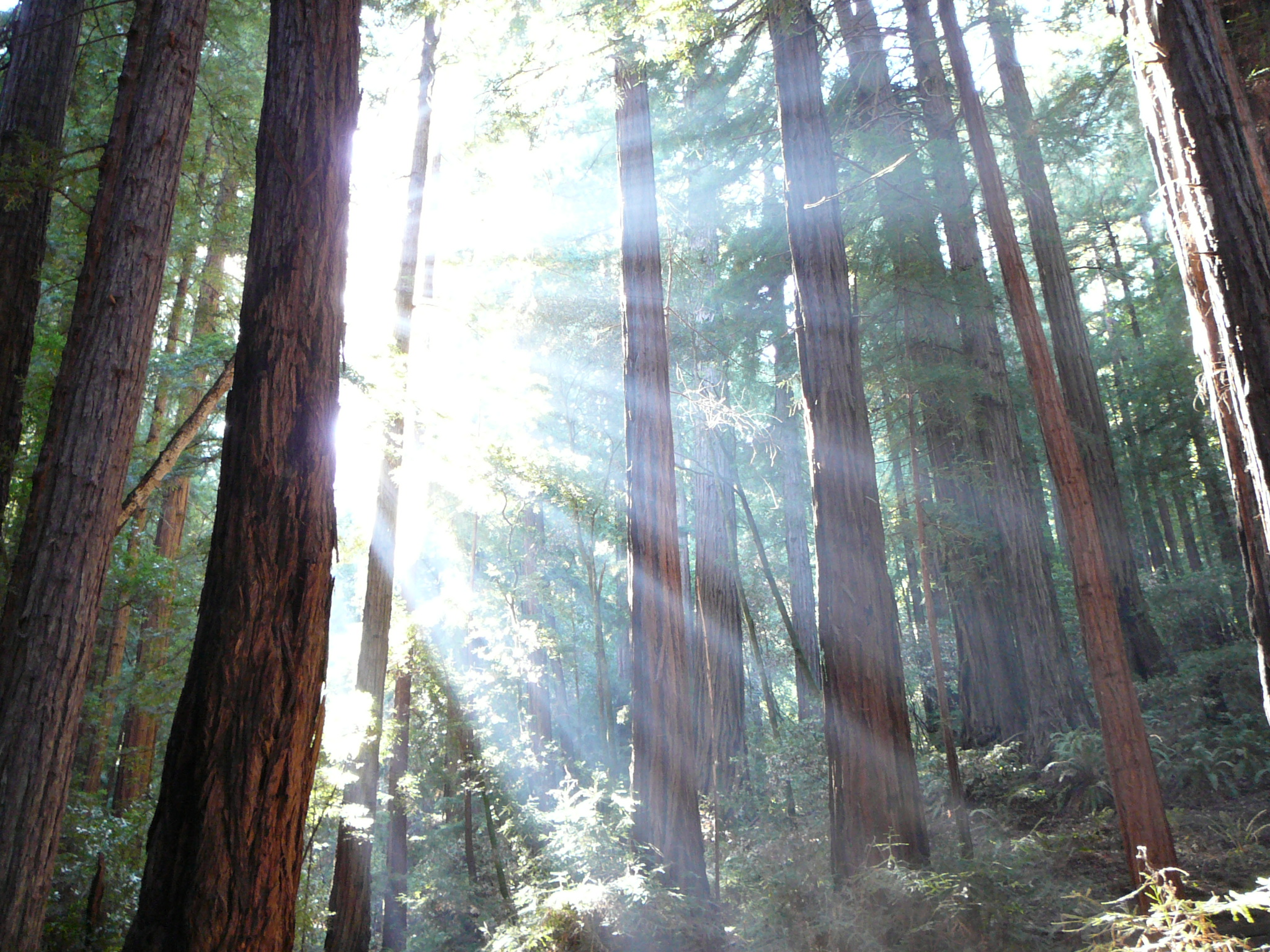
Muir Woods National Monument, Mill Valley

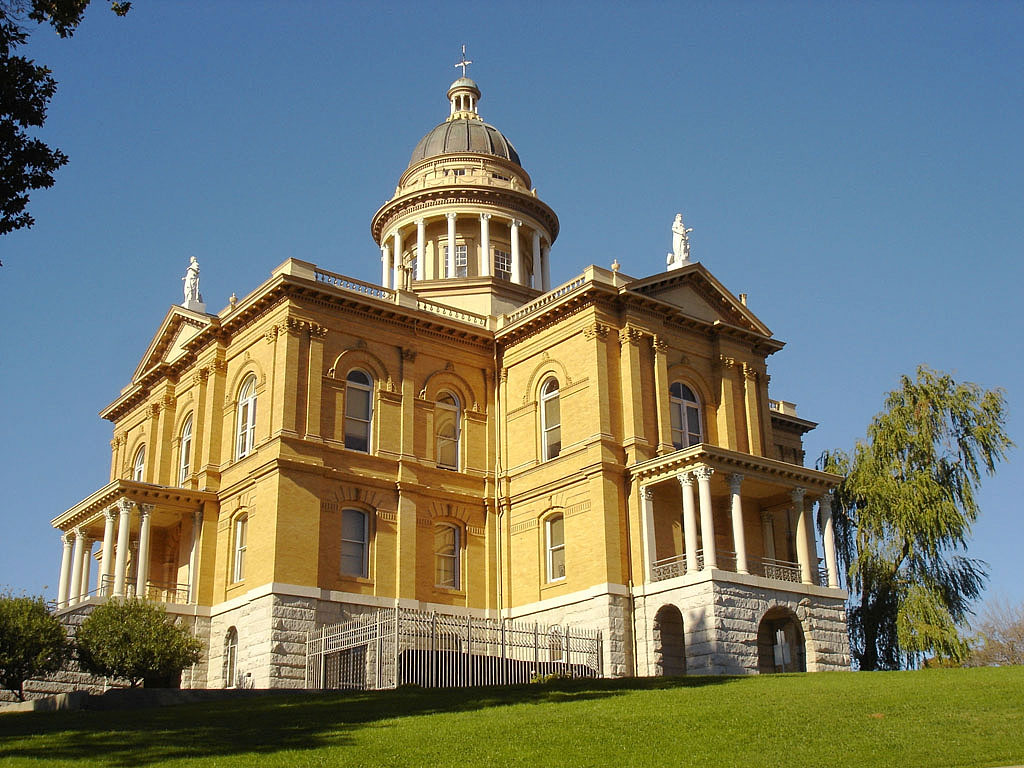
Old Auburn Historic District

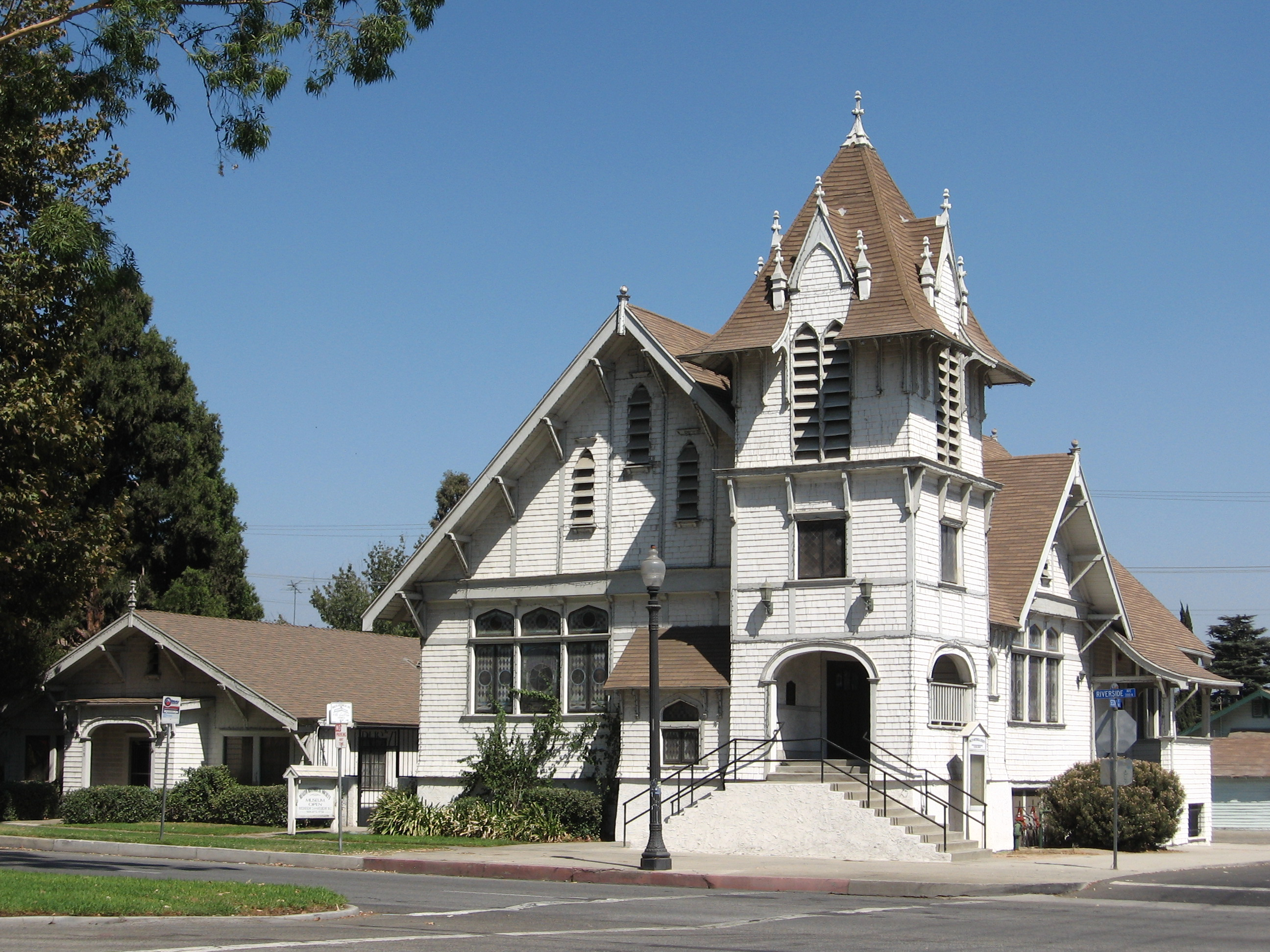
First Christian Church of Rialto

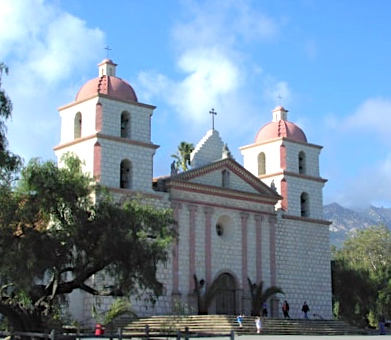
Santa Barbara Mission

== See also ==
- Bibliography of California history
- List of bridges on the National Register of Historic Places in California
- List of historical societies in California
- List of National Historic Landmarks in California
- List of California Historical Landmarks
