= Mount Harkness Fire Lookout =

- U.S. National Register of Historic Places
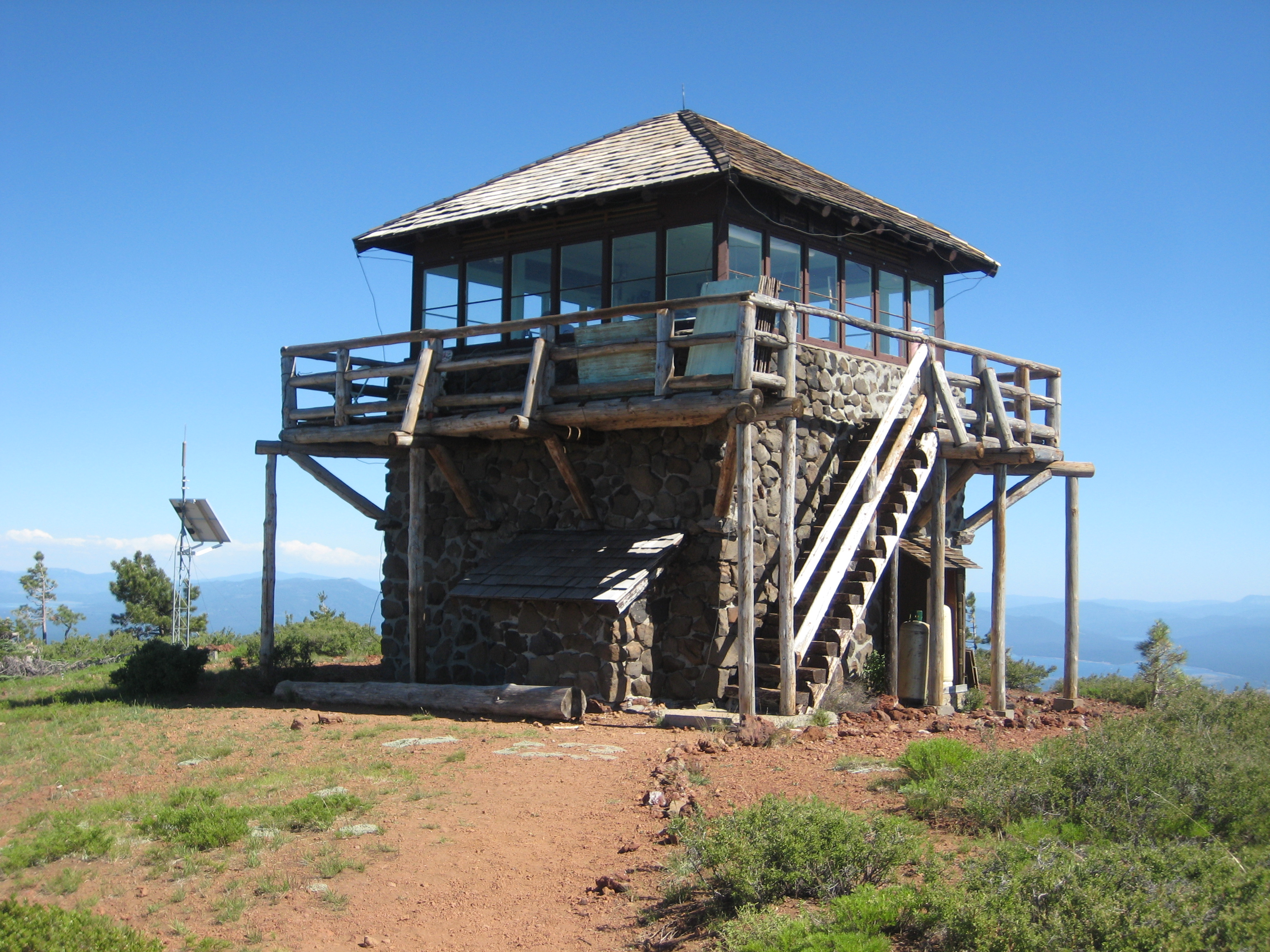

- Location within California
- Location: Lassen Volcanic National Park
- Coordinates: 40°25′52″N 121°18′06″W
- Area: less than one acre
- MPS: Historic Park Landscapes in National and State Parks MPS
- NRHP reference No.: 100001211
- Added to NRHP: June 19, 2017

The Mount Harkness Fire Lookout, on Mount Harkness in Lassen Volcanic National Park, in Plumas County, California near Mineral, California, was listed on the National Register of Historic Places in 2017.

It was built in 1931 to a "classic rustic NPS design". It has a 15 by 15 feet (4.6 m × 4.6 m) cab with a log catwalk and railings, upon a 15 feet (4.6 m) stone tower.

It is at elevation 7,985 feet (2,434 m) and is staffed and open during the summer.

It is one of fewer than 40 operating National Park Service (NPS) fire lookouts in 2019.

It was destroyed by the July/August 2021 Dixie Fire.
