= Park Headquarters, Lassen Volcanic National Park =

- U.S. National Register of Historic Places
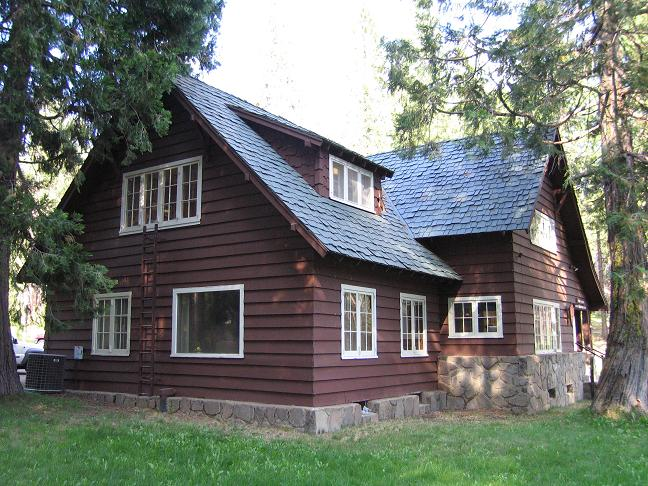

- Location within California Location within the United States
- Location: Off CA 36, Mineral, California
- Coordinates: 40°20′45″N 121°36′27″W
- Built: 1929
- Architectural style: National Park Service Rustic
- NRHP reference No.: 06000490
- Added to NRHP: October 03, 1978

The Headquarters Building at Lassen Volcanic National Park was built in 1928 in an adapted National Park Service Rustic style.

The building served not only as the administration building but as a visitor center, and it quickly became too small for the developing park's needs. It was remodeled three times during its first eleven years. In 1932, the west wing was expanded with an addition that included men's and women's bathrooms and an enlargement to the superintendent's office. A back porch was added in 1935 to protect the doorways and windows from snow and to provide storage space for furnace wood.

The park's Developmental Outline for 1938 states that due to development in the park, the building was not large enough, adding "[m]oreover, the present building does not have sufficient storage space, is hard to keep warm in winter, and presents a bleak and unattractive aspect on the outside which gives all park visitors coming by the Headquarters Area a very bad first impression of the park." The park proposed moving the present building elsewhere on the site and converting it to housing, and building a new Administration and Visitor Center Building. Funding was not available for a new building so from 1939 through 1940 the building received a major renovation with the addition of an east wing, which also included an addition to the basement. This work was done according to drawings LV-NP 3004 C & D, designed by G. W. Norgard of the Branch of Plans and Designs, and was a Civilian Conservation Corps construction project. At that time, an engineer's office was added to the second floor, the stairs were reconfigured, a clerk's office was added to the first floor and the Assistant Superintendent's office was expanded. The new east wing had a wood shingled dormer on the south side, and a similar dormer was added to the west wing and the eave extended. The front entrance porch in the north wing was enclosed to expand the lobby and a new stone porch was added to its east side. Stone veneer was applied below the windows on the front and on the exposed concrete foundations. A wood flagpole in a stone base and a stone water fountain were installed on the front lawn.
