= Prospect Peak Fire Lookout =

- U.S. National Register of Historic Places
- Location within California Location within the United States
- Nearest city: Mineral, California
- Coordinates: 40°34′24″N 121°20′42″W
- Area: less than one acre
- Built: c. 1912
- NRHP reference No.: 78000295
- Added to NRHP: March 30, 1978

The Prospect Peak Fire Lookout is a fire lookout station located on Prospect Peak in Lassen Volcanic National Park, near the city of Mineral, California. The lookout, which was built circa 1912, is one of the oldest extant U.S. Forest Service fire lookouts in the United States. The wood-frame building is square with a pyramidal roof; its walls are mostly composed of tall windows, with shiplap siding below the windows and on the roof. This design was a standard design used by U.S. Forest Service fire lookouts at the time, and several of the other contemporary lookouts in the national park also used this style of construction. The lookout is likely now the only surviving station with this design. Though the station was ultimately abandoned and has lost its original windows and roof shingles, it is otherwise intact.

The lookout was added to the National Register of Historic Places on March 30, 1978.
