= Horseshoe Lake Ranger Station =

- U.S. National Register of Historic Places
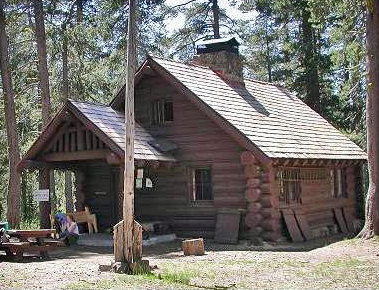

- Location within California Location within the United States
- Nearest city: Chester, California
- Coordinates: 40°28′23″N 121°19′48″W
- Area: 0.1 acres (0.040 ha)
- Built: 1934
- Built by: Civilian Conservation Corps
- Architect: National Park Service
- NRHP reference No.: 78000292
- Added to NRHP: May 5, 1978

The Horseshoe Lake Ranger Station in Lassen Volcanic National Park, California is a backcountry ranger station that was built by Civilian Conservation Corps labor in 1934. The cabin typifies National Park Service standard designs for such structures in the prevailing National Park Service Rustic style then used by the Park Service. It is the only such example of a standard-plan backcountry ranger station in Lassen Volcanic National Park. There were originally two structures at the site, the residence, and a now-vanished barn.

The rectangular ranger station is a log structure measuring about 33 feet (10 m) by 23 feet (7.0 m), extended by front and back porches. The front porch is a gabled structure supported by peeled-log posts. The back porch has no roof. Split-pole chinking is used throughout. The interior comprises a large living room measuring 20 feet (6.1 m) by 13 feet (4.0 m), a kitchen and a bedroom. A former enclosed porch functions as a storeroom. An attic is used for storage, and floors are oiled wood. The living room and bedroom feature a stone fireplace.

Construction of what was then called the Horseshoe Lake Fireguard Station and Barn started in 1934 and was completed on October 22 of that year, to Park Service plan #3032. The Park Service designed an elaborately rustic barn for this location, but a more utilitarian barn was actually built.

The Horseshoe Lake Ranger Station was placed on the National Register of Historic Places on May 5, 1978.
