= Edward Frisbie House (Branford, Connecticut) =

Historic house in Connecticut, United States

- U.S. National Register of Historic Places
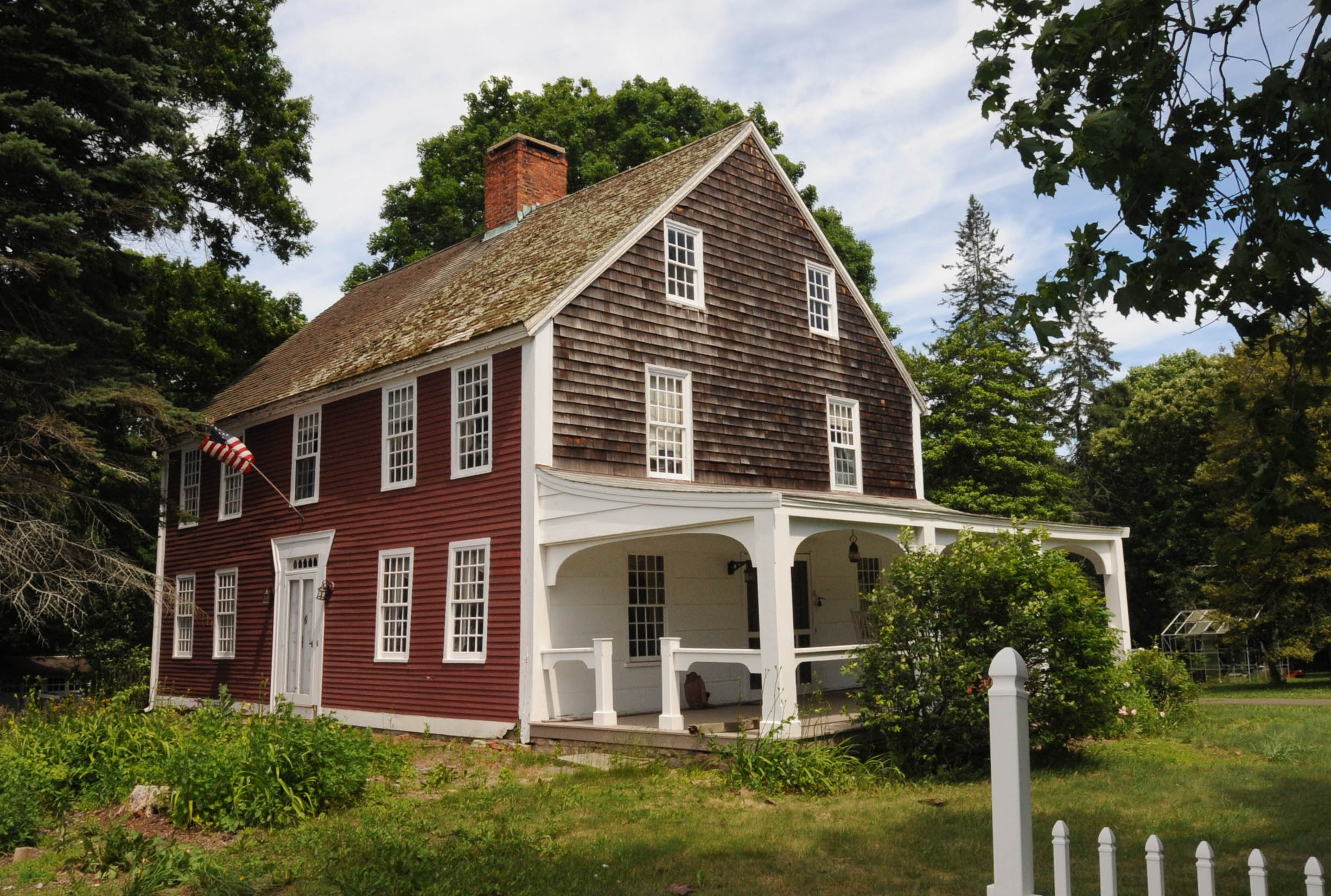

- Location within Connecticut Location within the United States
- Location: 699 East Main Street, Branford, Connecticut
- Coordinates: 41°18′15″N 72°45′22″W
- Area: 5 acres (2.0 ha)
- Built: 1750
- Built by: Frisbie, Edward
- Architectural style: Colonial, New England Colonial
- MPS: Colonial Houses of Branford TR
- NRHP reference No.: 88002638
- Added to NRHP: December 1, 1988

The Edward Frisbie House is a historic house at 699 East Main Street U.S. Route 1 in Branford, Connecticut. Probably built about 1750, it is a fine local example of Georgian residential architecture, historically attributed to one of the area's early settlers. It was listed on the National Register of Historic Places in 1988.

== Description and history ==
The Edward Frisbie House is located in Eastern Branford, on the South Side of East Main Street (U.S. Route 1) near its Junction with Baldwin Drive. It is a 2 1/2-story wood-frame structure, with a gabled roof, central chimney, and clapboarded exterior. A single-story shed-roof porch extends across the right side, with chamfered square posts and arched valances between them. The main facade faces north, and is five bays wide, with sash windows arranged symmetrically around the center entrance. The entrance is framed by a moulded surround with flared corners, and has a four-light transom window. The property includes a barn that also exhibits early construction techniques.

The house has historically been said to be the home of Edward Frisbie, one of the original grantees of land that is now Branford, and was assigned a construction date of about 1685, based on his will. However, architectural evidence of the construction techniques used suggest a Second Period construction date, probably c. 1750. The house is a particularly well-preserved example of 18th-century architecture, one of a modest number of such surviving houses in the town. It is also one of a handful of extant historic homes, not to be confused with one another, located in New Haven County and all associated with various members of the Frisbie family who settled Branford in 1644: the Edward Frisbie Homestead (ca. 1790, Branford); the Levi Frisbie House (1814, Branford); Fowler-Frisbie-West House (1682, Guilford); Frisbie-Todd House (1791, originally in Hamden, later saved and restored in Woodbridge).

== See also ==
- National Register of Historic Places listings in New Haven County, Connecticut

The original assignation of 1685 is far more accurate given details of construction such as the existence within the house, around the fireplace(s), of the "Indian Stairwell" which was built to provide hiding space in the event of attack by native Indians. Additionally, given the property's use as a farm has led to the discovery of many arrowheads. The front door is also manufactured in what is referred to as a "Hatchet" style, which essentially was considered a gesture of openness to friendly Dutch traders. Last, an examination of the timbers and construction technique in the attic lend verification to an earlier date, given the exposed roman numerals on the hand adzed rafters present.
