= Cottonwood Historic District =

Historic district in California, United States

- U.S. National Register of Historic Places
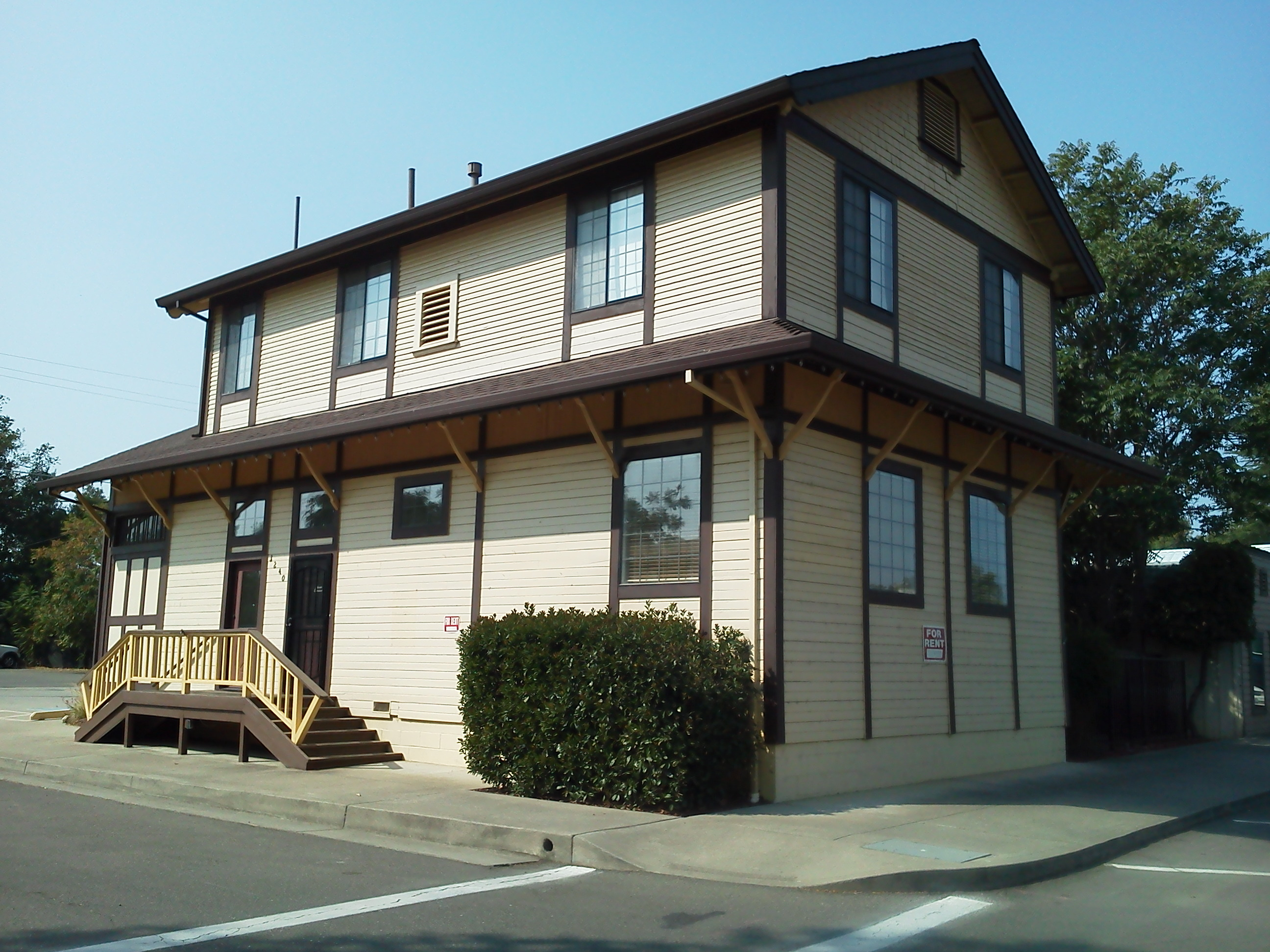

- Location within California
- Location: Parts of Front St. and Bush St., Cottonwood, California
- Coordinates: 40°22′57″N 122°16′48″W
- Area: 9 acres (3.6 ha)
- Built: 1852
- NRHP reference No.: 73000456
- Added to NRHP: July 16, 1973

The Cottonwood Historic District, in Cottonwood, California in Shasta County, California, was listed on the National Register of Historic Places in 1973. The listing included four contributing buildings on 9 acres (3.6 ha).

It is located off US 99, on the southern boundary of Shasta County, the north side of Cottonwood Creek.

The district includes a railroad depot (in 1970 used as a storage building) on Front Street, the old Cottonwood school on Bush Street (in 1970 used as the Grange Hall), and the old First Baptist Church on Bush Street. It may have been intended to include several brick commercial buildings on Front Street, and some old residences.
