= Buck Camp Patrol Cabin =

- U.S. National Register of Historic Places
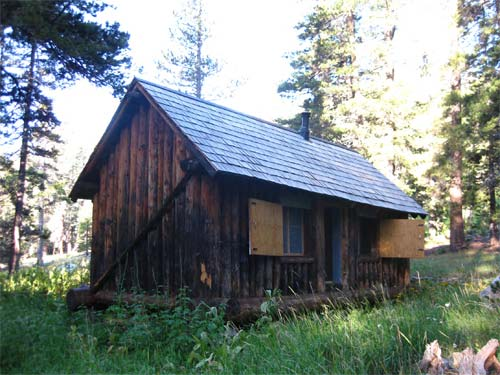
- National Park Service image

- Location within California
- Location: Junction of Buck Creek and Buck Camp Trail, Yosemite National Park, Yosemite, California
- Coordinates: 37°33′47″N 119°29′23″W
- Area: 15.7 acres (6.4 ha)
- Architectural style: Log cabin
- NRHP reference No.: 14000406
- Added to NRHP: July 18, 2014

The Buck Camp Patrol Cabin in Yosemite National Park was listed on the National Register of Historic Places in 2014.

It is a one-story log cabin built in National Park Service Rustic style. It is 14 by 29 feet (4.3 m × 8.8 m) in plan.
