= Edward Frisbie Homestead =

Historic house in Connecticut, United States

- U.S. National Register of Historic Places
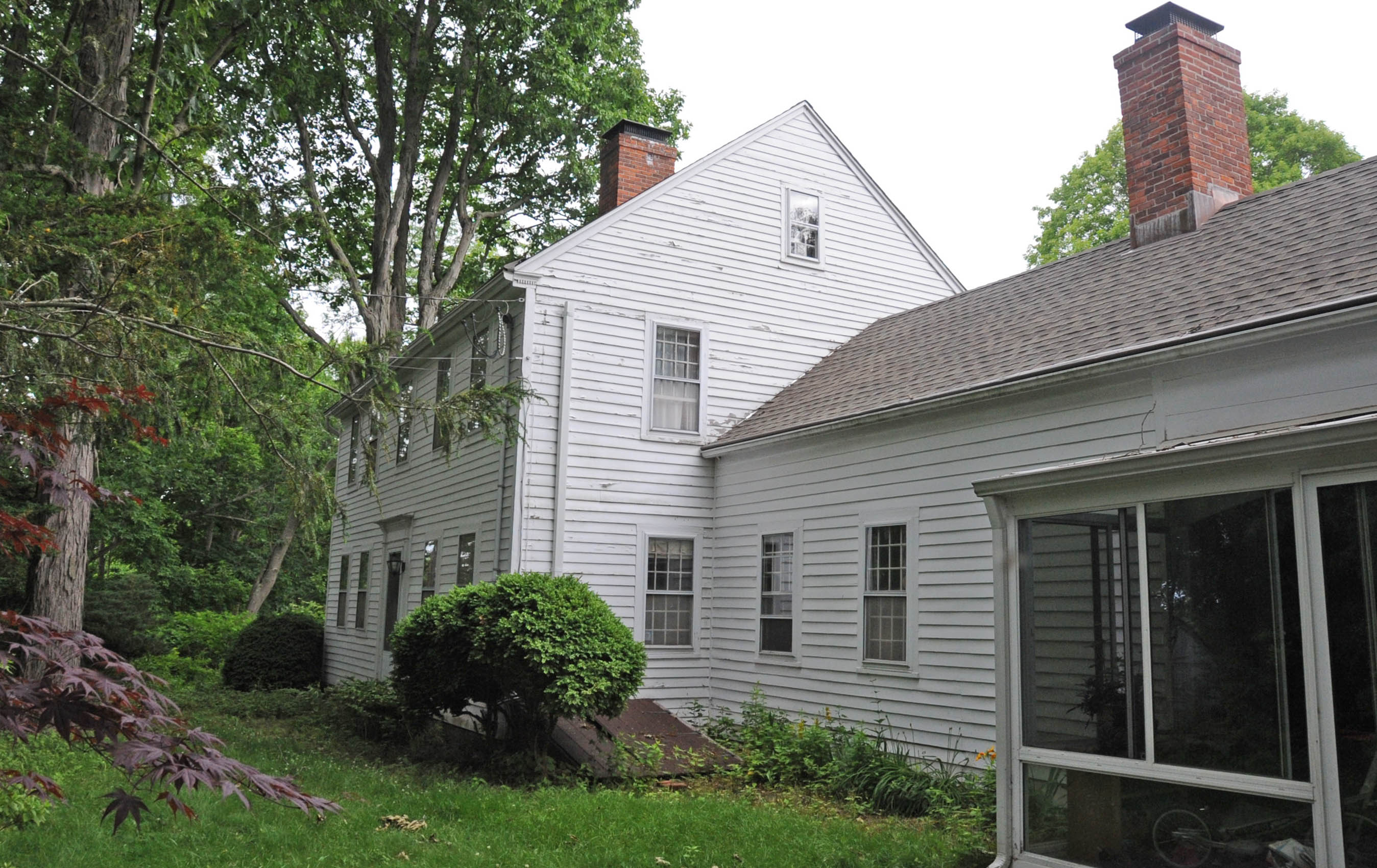

- Location within Connecticut Location within the United States
- Location: 240 Stony Creek Road, Branford, Connecticut
- Coordinates: 41°16′31″N 72°45′27″W
- Area: 3.6 acres (1.5 ha)
- Built: 1790
- Architectural style: Federal
- NRHP reference No.: 85001058
- Added to NRHP: May 16, 1985

The Edward Frisbie Homestead is a historic house at 240 Stony Creek Road in Branford, Connecticut, United States. Built about 1790 by the grandson of one of Branford's first settlers, it is a little-altered and well-preserved example of Federal period architecture. It was listed on the National Register of Historic Places in 1985.

== Description and history ==
The Edward Frisbie Homestead stands in a rural-suburban area of eastern Branford, on the north side of Stony Creek Road (Connecticut Route 146) just west of its junction with Leete Island Road. It is a 2 1/2-story wood-frame structure, with a gabled roof, central chimney, and clapboard exterior. A single-story gabled ell extends to the right side of the south-facing main block. The main facade is five bays wide, with sash windows arranged symmetrically around the center entrance. The entrance consists of a six-panel door flanked by paneled pilasters and topped by a corniced entablature. The interior follows a central chimney plan, and retains a large amount of original woodwork. Doors and windows are framed with pilasters, and fireplace walls have carved mantels and paneling.

The house was built about 1790 by Edward Frisbie, the grandson of another Edward Frisbie, who was one of the original grantees of land that became Branford. The house is particularly elegant in comparison to other surviving houses of the time and neighborhood, probably due to Frisbie's success as a smuggler during the American Revolutionary War. He and his descendants were active in town affairs, and retained ownership of the property until 1870.

The Frisbie Homestead is one of a handful of extant historic homes located in New Haven County that are all associated with various members of the Frisbie family who were among the original settlers of Branford in 1644. Among these are the Edward Frisbie Home (ca. 1750, Branford); the Levi Frisbie House (1814, Branford); the Fowler-Frisbie-West House (1682, Guilford); and the Frisbie-Todd House (1791, originally in Hamden, later saved and restored in Woodbridge).

== See also ==
- National Register of Historic Places listings in New Haven County, Connecticut
