= Oak Run, California =

Unincorporated community in California, United States

- Unincorporated community Census-designated place
- Location in California Oak Run, California (the United States)
- Coordinates: 40°41′24.73″N 122°1′42.56″W
- Country: United States
- State: California
- County: Shasta

Area
  - Total: 3.018 sq mi (7.82 km^{2})
  - Land: 3.013 sq mi (7.80 km^{2})
  - Water: 0.005 sq mi (0.013 km^{2})
- Elevation: 1,565 ft (477 m)

Population (2020)
  - Total: 158
  - Density: 52.4/sq mi (20.2/km^{2})
- Time zone: UTC-8 (Pacific)
  - Summer (DST): UTC-7 (PDT)
- GNIS feature ID: 2813353

Oak Run (also Oakrun) is a small unincorporated community and census-designated place (CDP) 23 miles (37 km) east of Redding, California, United States. Its population is 158 as of the 2020 census. The ZIP Code is 96069. The community is served by area code 530. It was the site of a massacre of 300 Yana Indians in 1864.

== Politics ==
In the state legislature Oak Run is in the 1st State Senate District, represented by Republican Megan Dahle, and in the 1st State Assembly District, represented by Republican Heather Hadwick.

Federally, Oak Run is in California's 1st congressional district, represented by Republican James Gallagher.

== Economy ==
Oak Run is home to the Phillips Brothers Mill, the last fully steam-powered sawmill in the United States, which is listed on the National Register of Historic Places.

== Climate ==
This region experiences warm, and occasionally hot, dry summers, with the average monthly temperatures in the summer months of July, August, and September averaging, respectively, 93, 93, and 89 °F. Two month, January and February, experience freezing weather, with 12 inches of annual snowfall. The area receives an average of 63 inches of rain annually, concentrated during the months of November through March. According to the Köppen Climate Classification system, Oak Run has a warm-summer Mediterranean climate, abbreviated "Csb" on climate maps.

== Demographics ==
Historical population
Census	Pop.	Note	%±
2020	158		—
U.S. Decennial Census; 1850–1870 1880-1890; 1900 1910 1920; 1930 1940 1950; 1960 1970 1980; 1990 2000 2010; 2020

Oak Run first appeared as a census designated place in the 2020 U.S. census.

=== 2020 Census ===
Oak Run CDP, California – Racial and ethnic composition Note: the US Census treats Hispanic/Latino as an ethnic category. This table excludes Latinos from the racial categories and assigns them to a separate category. Hispanics/Latinos may be of any race.
Race / Ethnicity (NH = Non-Hispanic)	Pop 2020	% 2020
White alone (NH)	125	79.11%
Black or African American alone (NH)	0	0.00%
Native American or Alaska Native alone (NH)	4	2.53%
Asian alone (NH)	4	2.53%
Pacific Islander alone (NH)	2	1.27%
Other race alone (NH)	0	0.00%
Mixed race or Multiracial (NH)	10	6.33%
Hispanic or Latino (any race)	13	8.23%
Total	158	100.00%
