= Phillips Brothers Mill =

- U.S. National Register of Historic Places
- Location within California
- Nearest city: Oak Run, California
- Coordinates: 40°43′22″N 121°59′06″W
- Area: 7.5 acres (3.0 ha)
- Built: 1933
- Built by: Phillips Brothers
- NRHP reference No.: 02001406
- Added to NRHP: December 2, 2002

The Phillips Brothers Mill is a sawmill and box factory in Shasta County, California, near Oak Run, California, that was first built in 1898 and moved to its current site in 1933. It is notable for all production machinery being powered by stationary steam engines, little changed since it was first constructed. The mill produces both rough-sawn and planed lumber from locally harvested trees. The adjoining box factory originally produced packing crates for fruit growers but now produces decorative boxes for a variety of customers and gift items for sale at the mill. It was listed on the National Register of Historic Places in 2002. The listing included 17 contributing buildings and three contributing structures on 7.5 acres (3.0 ha).

Architect: Phillips Brothers

Historic function: Industry/processing/extraction

Historic subfunction: Manufacturing Facility

It is located approximately 30 miles (48 km) northeast of Redding, California.

National Register of Historic Places reference number 02001406
