= National Register of Historic Places listings in Lassen County, California =

Location of Lassen County in California

This is a list of the National Register of Historic Places listings in Lassen County, California.

This is intended to be a complete list of the properties and districts on the National Register of Historic Places in Lassen County, California, United States. Latitude and longitude coordinates are provided for many National Register properties and districts; these locations may be seen together in a Google map.

There are 7 properties and districts listed on the National Register in the county.

This National Park Service list is complete through NPS recent listings posted September 4, 2026.

== Current listings ==
	Name on the Register	Image	Date listed	Location	City or town	Description
1	Bruff's Rock Petroglyph Site		January 2, 2004 (#03001356)	Address Restricted	Susanville	
2	Lassen County Court House	Lassen County Court House	January 23, 1998 (#97001659)	Courthouse Square; 40°24′59″N 120°39′45″W	Susanville	
3	Nobles Emigrant Trail	Nobles Emigrant Trail	October 3, 1975 (#75000222)	E of Shingletown in Lassen Volcanic National Park; 40°32′50″N 121°25′29″W	Shingletown	Extends into Shasta County.
4	Roop's Fort	Roop's Fort	May 2, 1974 (#74000516)	N. Weatherlow St. 40°25′08″N 120°39′20″W	Susanville	
5	Standish Hall	Standish Hall	June 17, 2005 (#05000596)	718-820 US 395 E 40°21′54″N 120°25′17″W	Standish	
6	Susanville Railroad Depot	Susanville Railroad Depot	April 5, 2001 (#01000332)	461 Richmond Rd. 40°24′42″N 120°39′31″W	Susanville	
7	Willow Creek Rim Archeological District		December 21, 1978 (#78000677)	Address Restricted	Litchfield	

== See also ==
- List of National Historic Landmarks in California
- National Register of Historic Places listings in California
- California Historical Landmarks in Lassen County, California
