= Lassen Volcanic National Park Highway Historic District =

Historic district in California, United States

- U.S. National Register of Historic Places
- U.S. Historic district
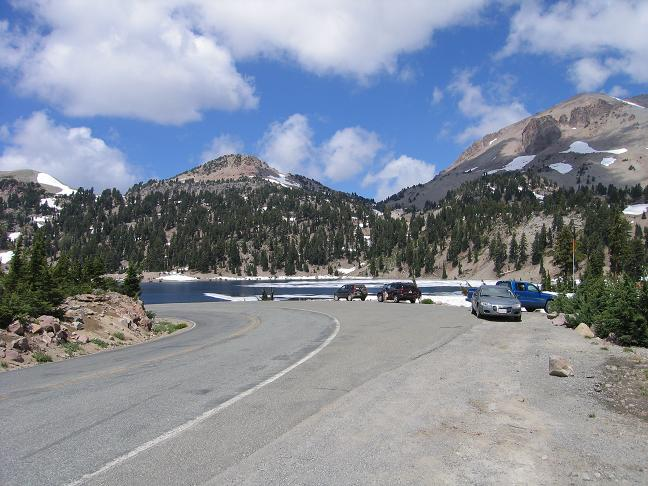

- Location within California Location within the United States
- Nearest city: Mineral, California
- Area: 290 acres (120 ha)
- Built: 1926
- Architect: Frank C. Hewitt et al.
- Architectural style: NPS Rustic
- MPS: Lassen Volcanic National Park MPS
- NRHP reference No.: 06000527
- Added to NRHP: June 23, 2006

The Lassen Volcanic National Park Highway Historic District includes the main roadway developed within Lassen Volcanic National Park in northern California from 1925 to 1951. The road was developed to allow tourists access to the central part of the national park, and was designed in accordance with National Park Service design principles for naturalistic road design and the National Park Service Rustic style of design and construction. The new road was intended to supplant existing primitive roads that led into the park from the periphery, cutting straight through the park to its major sights. The road is designated California State Route 89.

The Lassen Volcanic National Park Highway Historic District or California State Route 89, winds its way through Lassen Volcanic National Park in northern California, U.S.A. (2025).

== Design and construction ==
Planning began in 1922 with survey work by Park Service Chief Engineer George E. Goodwin and landscape designer Daniel Ray Hull. A route was selected and final design work took place in 1923. There was considerable internal debate concerning the extent of the road network, and the plan was scaled back to allow for more back country. Construction began in 1925 on two sections in the southwest and northwest, intended to create a road on the eastern slopes of Lassen Peak. At the same time a ranger station was developed at Summit Lake, which was to be the midpoint of the road network. Control of the project was transferred to the Bureau of Public Roads in 1926, with design adjustments to conform to BPR practice. Work continued in the short building season available each year. In 1929 the park was expanded and the road network was adjusted to create an entrance at Manzanita Lake. The route was essentially complete in time for the park's dedication in July 1931. Work continued on surfacing and accessories, including entrance signs and rustic entrance stations at the Sulphur Works and Manzanita Lake.

It was immediately apparent that further work was needed to create a durable road surface, and the road was reconstructed between 1931 and 1948, with work in the 1930s done by Civilian Conservation Corps labor. The road was finally paved entirely with asphalt in the 1950s. Further work was done in connection with the Mission 66 program in the 1950s and 60s, while blighted commercial inholdings were purchased and removed. The road was again reconstructed in the 1990s.

== Description ==
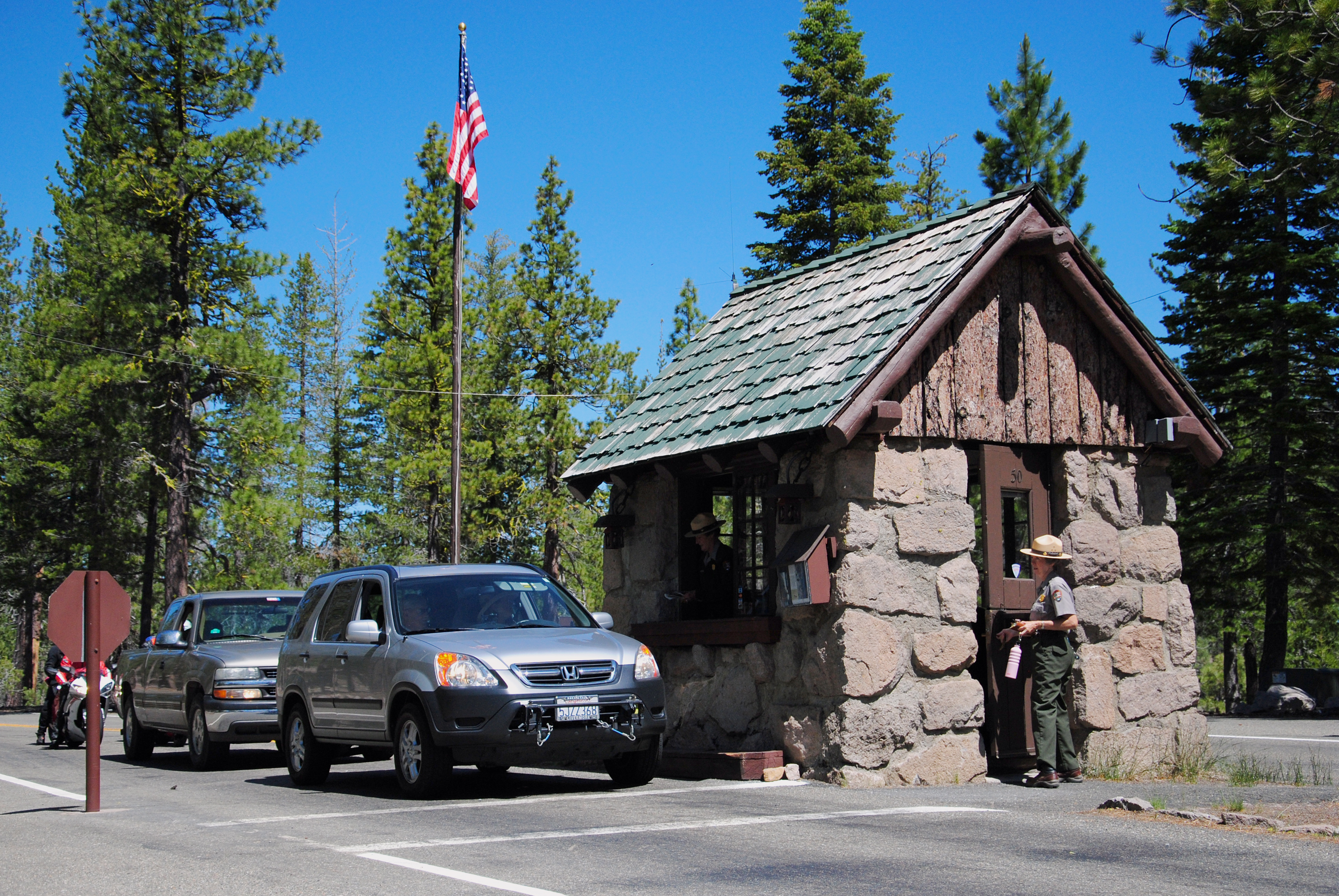
Northwest entrance

The road features typical Park Service rustic details such as stone retaining walls and culvert headwalls. It is designed to work naturally with the landscape to provide a progression of views to motorists without adverse impact on the land. Major contributing structures include the Northwest Entrance Pylon, the Northeast Entrance Checking Station and Ranger Residence and the Summit Lake Ranger Station. The Raker Memorial Gateway is not listed as a contributing structure due to its extensive rebuilding. The Summit Lake Ranger Station and the area around Manzanita Lake are listed on the National Register in their own right.

The highway was placed on the National Register of Historic Places on June 23, 2006.
