= Gladstone Houses =

- U.S. National Register of Historic Places
- Location within California
- Location: 12962-12964 Cline Gulch Rd., near French Gulch, California
- Coordinates: 40°43′16″N 122°34′52″W
- Area: 3.1 acres (1.3 ha)
- Built: 1909
- Architect: Gustav Stickley
- Architectural style: Craftsman
- NRHP reference No.: 95001374
- Added to NRHP: November 29, 1995

The Gladstone Houses, in Shasta County, California near French Gulch, California, are two Craftsman style houses that were built in 1909. They were listed on the National Register of Historic Places in 1995.

They have been attributed to architect Gustav Stickley, known for his development of American Craftsman architecture, although his direct involvement has not been proven. They are wood-framed houses built by I. O. Jillson, the owner of the Gladstone Mine. The one called the Lower Mansion, built c. 1912–1914, "has an L-shaped floor plan with a triple-intersecting hipped roof". The Upper House, built c. 1909, has a steep gable roof.

They are located up a rural road on a steep wooded 3.10 acres (1.25 ha) and overlook Cline Creek.
