= Summit Lake Ranger Station =

- U.S. National Register of Historic Places
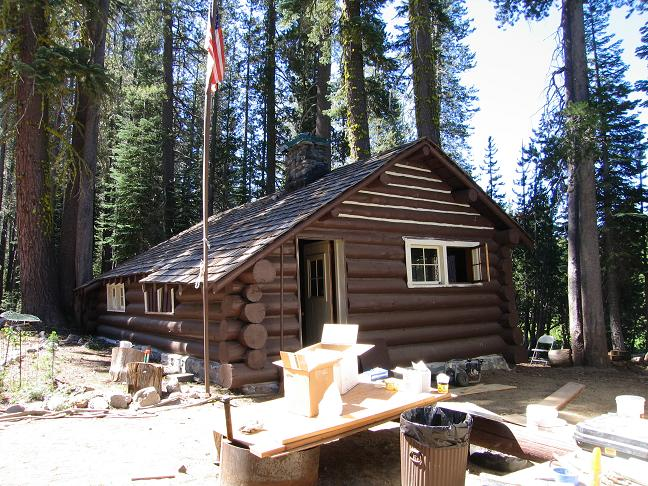

- Location within California Location within the United States
- Nearest city: Mineral, California
- Coordinates: 40°29′54″N 121°25′37″W
- Area: 0.5 acres (0.20 ha)
- Built: 1957
- Built by: National Park Service
- NRHP reference No.: 78000296
- Added to NRHP: April 3, 1978

The Summit Lake Ranger Station, also known as the Summit Lake Patrol Cabin, is one of the first three buildings constructed by the National Park Service in Lassen Volcanic National Park, California. Located near the center of the park on the main park road, the cabin was built in 1926. It is a log building measuring about 20 feet (6.1 m) by 30 feet (9.1 m) with an asymmetric gable roof that results in a long pitch to a low rear wall. The main portion of the station comprises a living area, kitchen, and two bedrooms. A former porch has been enclosed and houses a bathroom.

The Summit Lake Ranger Station was placed on the National Register of Historic Places on April 3, 1978. It is a contributing structure on the Lassen Volcanic National Park Highway Historic District.
