= Edward Frisbie House (Redding, California) =

- U.S. National Register of Historic Places
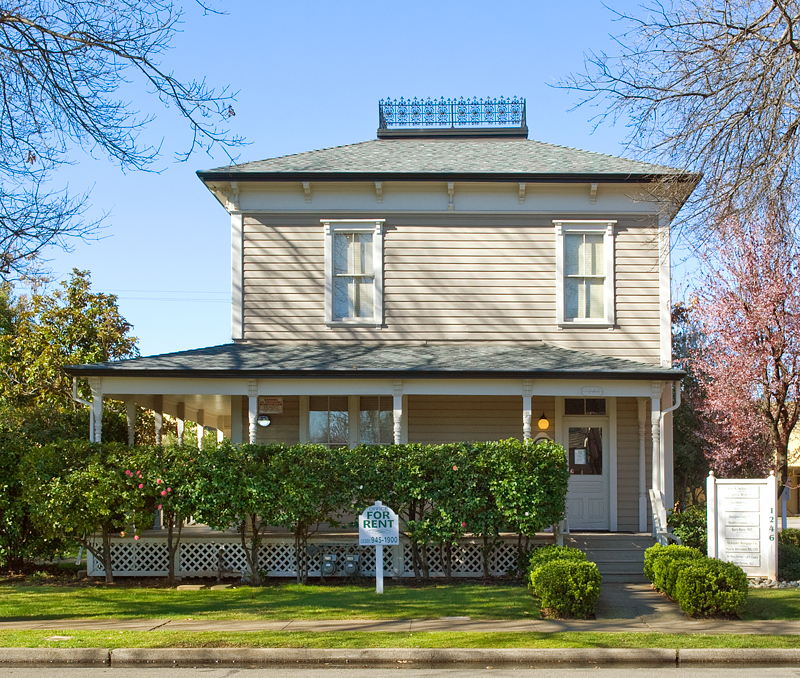
- Photo from 2014 showing a widow's walk

- Location within California
- Location: 1246 East St., Redding, California
- Coordinates: 40°35′14″N 122°23′18″W
- Area: less than one acre
- Built: 1887, 1930
- Architectural style: Italianate
- NRHP reference No.: 90000550
- Added to NRHP: March 29, 1990

The Edward Frisbie House, at 1246 East St. in Redding, California, is an Italianate-style house which was built in 1887. It was listed on the National Register of Historic Places in 1887.

It is a two-story house built somehow incorporating tongue-and-groove work. It was built in 1887 and expanded to the rear in 1930. It has a verandah, decorative moldings, cornices and brackets supporting its overhanging hipped roof. Its interior has an "original curved staircase and double sliding parlor doors." Its planned landscaping "includes the original plants and trees."

Its "roof line features a cornice, frieze board and corona with bed moldings and decorative brackets at all four elevations."

A reconstructed widow's walk was in place, but "was removed per instruction from the U.S. Department of Interior National Park Service, Division of Preservation Assistance Branch, on July 11, 1986", apparently for being not verifiably authentic.
