= Sulphur Creek Archeological District =

- U.S. National Register of Historic Places
- Nearest city: Mill Creek, California
- Area: 460 acres (1.9 km^{2})
- NRHP reference No.: 80000370
- Added to NRHP: April 14, 1980

Sulphur Creek Archeological District is a 460-acre (1.9 km^{2}) historic district in Shasta County, California and Tehama County, California. It was listed on the National Register of Historic Places in 1980 for its potential to provide information in the future. The area includes ten designated archeological sites.

It includes sites designated Teh-583 thru Teh-590, Teh-596, and Sha-786.
