= Drakesbad Guest Ranch =

- U.S. National Register of Historic Places
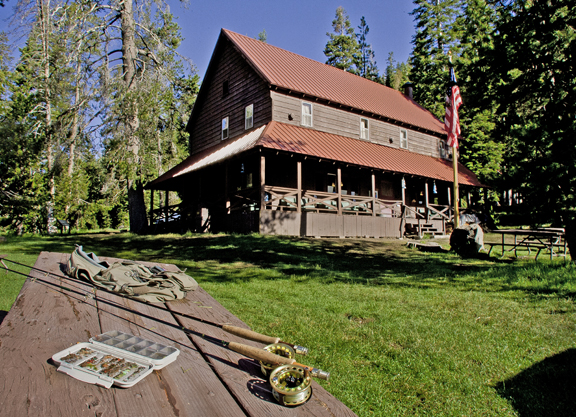

- Location within California Location within the United States
- Location: Drakesbad, California
- Built: 1909; 117 years ago
- Architect: Edward Drake
- NRHP reference No.: 03001062
- Added to NRHP: October 22, 2003

Drakesbad Guest Ranch, also known simply as Drakesbad, is a resort near Chester, California. It is located on Hot Springs Creek at the head of Warner Valley, inside Lassen Volcanic National Park.

== History ==
The original ranch was founded in the 1880s by Edward R. Drake (1830–1904). Drake was a trapper and miner who settled down to operate a tavern near Bidwell Bar, California. As mining declined Drake moved to Prattville and resumed trapping in the mountains. Drake settled in the Hot Springs Valley at some point in the late 1870s, building a cabin and eventually assembling about 400 acres (160 ha) encompassing a number of thermal features associate with the area's volcanism. Drake kept cattle at the homestead during the summer and moved back to Prattville during the winter. Drake sold "Drake's Hot Springs and Ranch" to Alexander Sifford in 1900.

=== Sifford family ===
Alexander Sifford, a schoolteacher from Susanville, came to the valley in 1900 to drink the mineral waters in hopes of relieving "nervous exhaustion." Sifford stayed for three days and agreed to buy the property from Drake for $5,000, giving Drake the right to continue to use the land. The Alexander and Ida Sifford established a guest ranch on the property, expanding Drake's bathhouse and guest cabin. In 1901 the Siffords bought a non-contiguous 40 acres (16 ha) parcel that included a portion of Boiling Springs Lake. Initially calling the place the "Mount Lassen Hot Springs Hotel", the Siffords settled on "Drakesbad" as the final name in 1908. From 1912 an infusion of capital allowed the Siffords to build a dining room and kitchen and twenty tent platforms, allowing them to charge higher rates. The family drained the willow flats around the property through a network of ditches, creating meadows which they harvested for hay. The 1914–15 eruptions of Lassen Peak brought tourists to the area, greatly increasing business at Drakesbad. When the national park was established, Drakesbad offered a convenient base for Park Service personnel to survey the area. Describing the camp as "crude", the park's first superintendent admitted that the food was good and proposed that the park's headquarters be built just to the east of Drakesbad.

Planning for the new park's road network intentionally bypassed the Warner Valley Road, in part because significant improvements would increase the value of the Sifford property, making its acquisition by the Park Service more difficult. The Warner Valley Road was the main means of visitor access to the park until new roads were completed in 1931. By 1936 the Siffrods had built a fishing pond called Dream Lake and four frame cabins.

The original Drake lodge was destroyed by the weight of winter snows during the winter of 1937–38. The pond had washed out, and most of the other facilities were damaged in some way, while the roads were nearly impassable. The Siffords, who now relied on their son Roy to do much of the management, contacted a local contractor who built a new lodge in ten days, finishing on June 30, 1938, with guests in their beds the same night. The Dream Lake dam was repaired the following year.

During World War II the Siffords raised cattle on their land under the S-Bar brand, continuing to raise cattle until 1951. Additional cabins were built in the late 1940s. By 1952 the property consisted of the lodge, dining hall, kitchen, bathhouse, swimming pool, hay barn, horse shed, four cottages, toilets, the cook's house (the original Sifford cabin), a duplex cabin and the foundation for another, and a variety of utility buildings and sheds totaling 28 structures. However, Ida Sifford died in 1951, and Pearl, her daughter and Roy's sister, became terminally ill, and a hard winter in 1951–52 again damaged many structures. The Park Service approached Roy Sifford and offered a buy-out, with the property appraised at $285,324.80. Roy and Pearl held out for more, using offers from timber and development companies as leverage, and settled for $325,000 in 1953. During the 1960s the property was upgraded with guest cabins, a pool and a bath house.

=== Park Service ownership ===
Prior to the sale, Roy Sifford had leased operations to Don Hummel, who managed the Manzanita Lake Lodge within the park. Hummel continued to operate Drakesbad as a park concession after Roy finally cut his ties with the ranch in 1958. Hummel added two cabins to the ranch, and in the 1960s the Park Service added three more and replaced the swimming pool and bathhouse under the Mission 66 program. A new sewage system was installed around 1960.

In the 1960s the original Sifford cabin was demolished with a few other very early buildings.

The resort is at 5,700 feet (1,700 m) altitude, features kerosene lamps—although the lodge was electrified in the 1990s—and has no room keys.

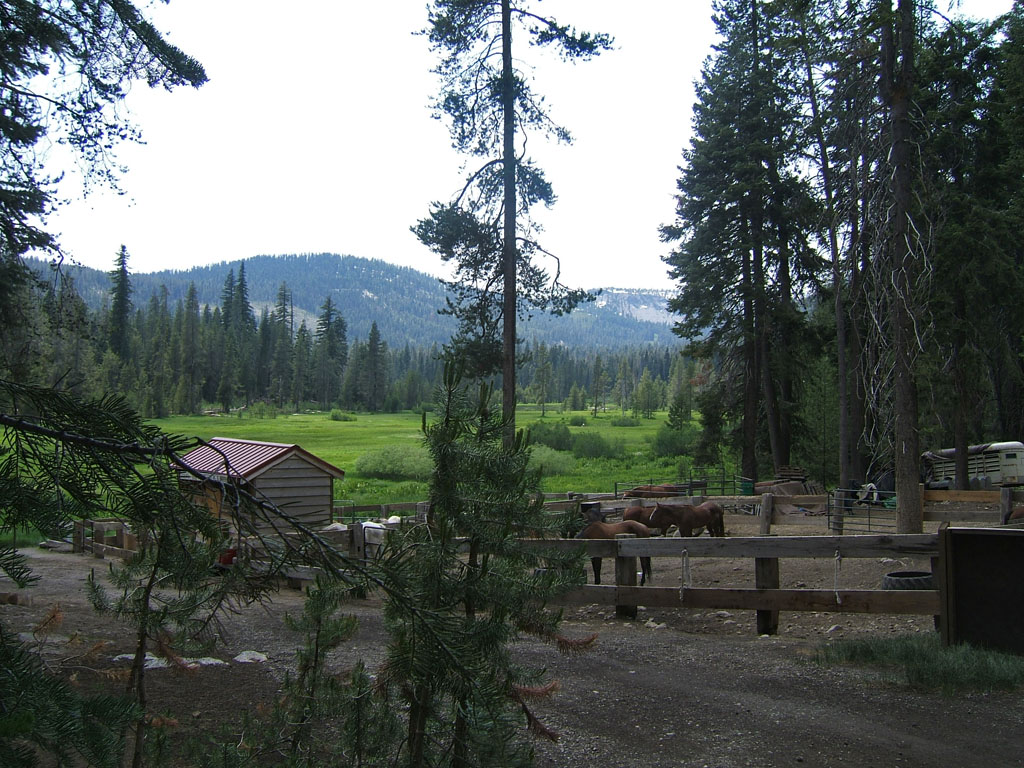
Drakesbad Guest Ranch corrals and Warner Valley.

== Historic designation ==
The Drakesbad Guest Ranch was listed in the National Register of Historic Places on October 22, 2003.

A November 2007 Los Angeles Times Travel feature article includes it within a top 15 list of California places to visit.
