= Chester, California =

Chester
- Unincorporated Community; Census Designated Place
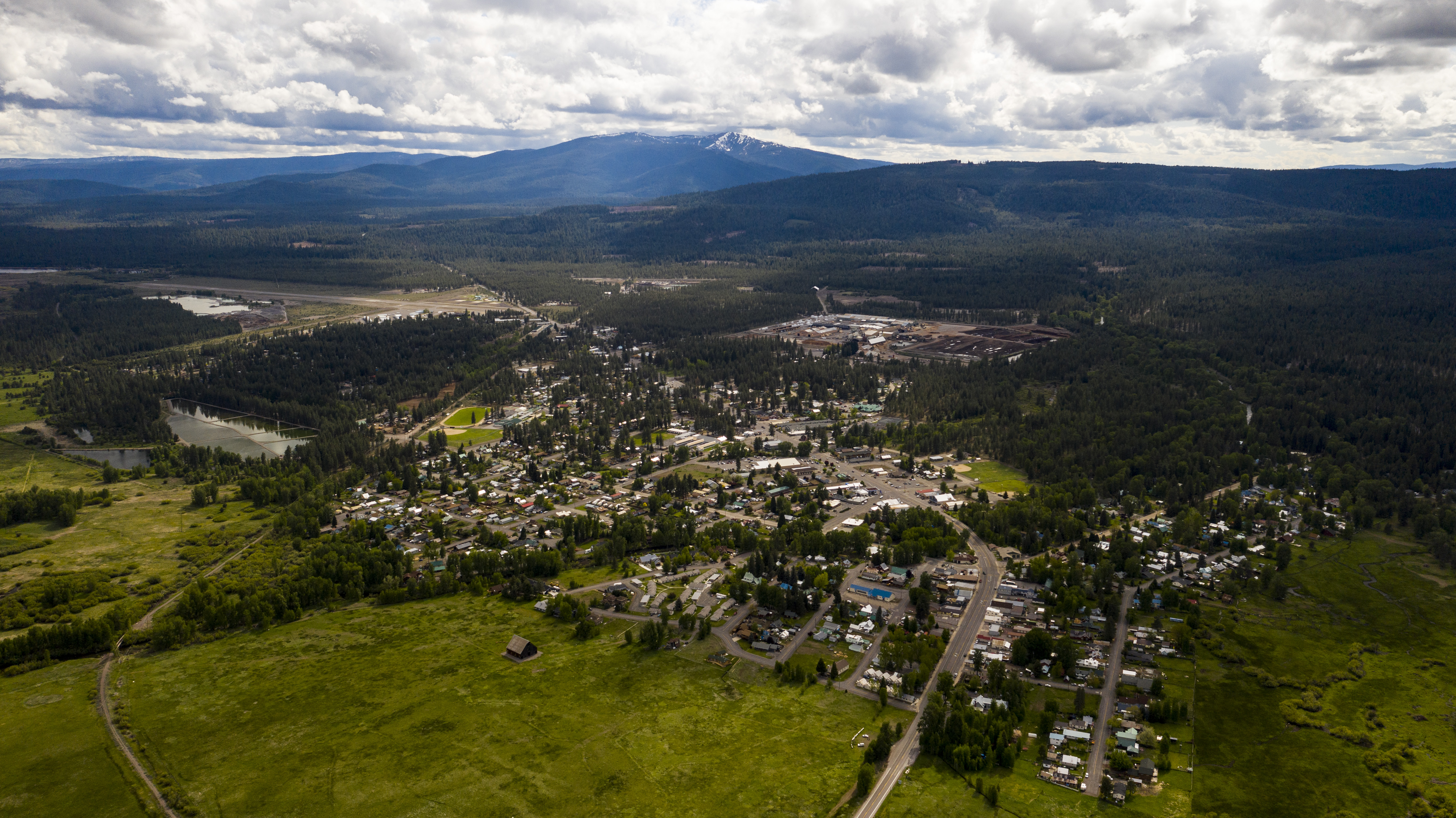
- Aerial photograph of Chester, California.

- Location in Plumas County and the state of California

- Location in the United States
- Coordinates: 40°18′09″N 121°14′05″W
- Country: United States
- State: California
- County: Plumas

Area
  - Total: 7.37 sq mi (19.08 km^{2})
  - Land: 7.29 sq mi (18.87 km^{2})
  - Water: 0.081 sq mi (0.21 km^{2}) 1.1%
- Elevation: 4,534 ft (1,382 m)

Population (2020)
  - Total: 2,187
  - Density: 300.1/sq mi (115.87/km^{2})
- Time zone: UTC-8 (Pacific (PST))
  - Summer (DST): UTC-7 (PDT)
- ZIP code: 96020
- Area codes: 530, 837
- FIPS code: 06-12930
- GNIS feature IDs: 277487; 2408021

Chester (formerly Big Meadows) is a census-designated place (CDP) in Plumas County, California, United States. Chester is located on Lake Almanor, 30 miles (48.3 km) north-northwest of Quincy. The town is located along State Route 36. The US Postal Service ZIP code for the community is 96020. The population was 2,187 at the 2020 census, up from 2,144 at the 2010 census.

The primary industries in Chester are lumber production and tourism. Chester serves as the retail center for the Lake Almanor region of California, and derives a significant portion of its economy from the tourist trade, and to a lesser degree from construction to new residents and businesses.

== History ==
The town was founded and named by two settlers, one from Chester, Vermont, and another from Chester, Missouri. The Chester post office opened in 1894 and moved in 1908.

== Geography ==
Chester is located at 40°18′10″N 121°14′5″W (40.302395, -121.234672).

According to the United States Census Bureau, the CDP has a total area of 19.1 km^{2} (7.4 sq mi), of which 18.9 km^{2} (7.3 sq mi) is land and 0.2 km^{2} (0.077 sq mi) (1.10%) is water.

Chester is situated almost directly over the buried northern end of the fault-block Sierra Nevada and the southernmost end of the volcanic Cascade Range.

== Climate ==
According to the Köppen climate classification, Chester has a transitional Csb/Dsb climate. Winters are cold and very snowy. Summers are dry, with hot days and cold nights.

Climate data for Chester, 1991–2020 normals, extremes 1957–present
Month	Jan	Feb	Mar	Apr	May	Jun	Jul	Aug	Sep	Oct	Nov	Dec	Year
Record high °F (°C)	65 (18)	70 (21)	77 (25)	84 (29)	93 (34)	98 (37)	104 (40)	103 (39)	100 (38)	90 (32)	76 (24)	62 (17)	104 (40)
Mean maximum °F (°C)	52.9 (11.6)	57.6 (14.2)	65.6 (18.7)	74.6 (23.7)	82.5 (28.1)	90.2 (32.3)	95.2 (35.1)	94.0 (34.4)	89.2 (31.8)	80.4 (26.9)	65.2 (18.4)	51.9 (11.1)	96.3 (35.7)
Mean daily maximum °F (°C)	42.2 (5.7)	45.6 (7.6)	50.5 (10.3)	57.1 (13.9)	66.8 (19.3)	76.6 (24.8)	86.1 (30.1)	85.0 (29.4)	78.9 (26.1)	65.9 (18.8)	50.6 (10.3)	41.2 (5.1)	62.2 (16.8)
Daily mean °F (°C)	32.0 (0.0)	34.3 (1.3)	38.4 (3.6)	43.7 (6.5)	51.8 (11.0)	59.6 (15.3)	67.1 (19.5)	65.6 (18.7)	59.8 (15.4)	49.5 (9.7)	38.5 (3.6)	31.6 (−0.2)	47.7 (8.7)
Mean daily minimum °F (°C)	21.8 (−5.7)	23.0 (−5.0)	26.3 (−3.2)	30.2 (−1.0)	36.7 (2.6)	42.7 (5.9)	48.2 (9.0)	46.3 (7.9)	40.6 (4.8)	33.1 (0.6)	26.4 (−3.1)	21.9 (−5.6)	33.1 (0.6)
Mean minimum °F (°C)	8.1 (−13.3)	10.0 (−12.2)	14.7 (−9.6)	20.6 (−6.3)	27.5 (−2.5)	32.5 (0.3)	39.6 (4.2)	38.8 (3.8)	31.5 (−0.3)	24.3 (−4.3)	15.6 (−9.1)	8.5 (−13.1)	3.3 (−15.9)
Record low °F (°C)	−11 (−24)	−10 (−23)	−3 (−19)	5 (−15)	14 (−10)	24 (−4)	27 (−3)	27 (−3)	15 (−9)	12 (−11)	3 (−16)	−16 (−27)	−16 (−27)
Average precipitation inches (mm)	6.18 (157)	5.11 (130)	5.48 (139)	2.51 (64)	1.90 (48)	0.77 (20)	0.36 (9.1)	0.15 (3.8)	0.31 (7.9)	1.70 (43)	3.31 (84)	6.54 (166)	34.32 (871.8)
Average snowfall inches (cm)	31.9 (81)	24.9 (63)	19.0 (48)	3.8 (9.7)	0.2 (0.51)	0.0 (0.0)	0.0 (0.0)	0.0 (0.0)	0.0 (0.0)	0.3 (0.76)	10.1 (26)	23.4 (59)	113.6 (287.97)
Average extreme snow depth inches (cm)	24 (61)	25 (64)	20 (51)	0 (0)	0 (0)	0 (0)	0 (0)	0 (0)	0 (0)	0 (0)	6 (15)	15 (38)	35 (89)
Average precipitation days	12.2	10.5	12.0	9.3	7.2	3.5	1.6	1.3	2.1	5.3	8.8	11.8	85.6
Average snowy days (≥ 0.1 in)	5.6	4.3	2.9	1.3	0.1	0.0	0.0	0.0	0.0	0.1	1.9	4.7	20.9
Source 1: NOAA
Source 2: National Weather Service

== Demographics ==
Historical population
Census	Pop.	Note	%±
1960	1,553		—
1970	1,531		−1.4%
1980	1,756		14.7%
1990	2,082		18.6%
2000	2,316		11.2%
2010	2,144		−7.4%
2020	2,187		2.0%
U.S. Decennial Census; 1850–1870 1880-1890; 1900 1910 1920; 1930 1940 1950; 1960 1970 1980; 1990 2000 2010

Chester first appeared as an unincorporated community in the 1960 U.S. census and as a census designated place in the 1980 United States census.

=== Racial and ethnic composition ===
Chester CDP, California – Racial and ethnic composition Note: the US Census treats Hispanic/Latino as an ethnic category. This table excludes Latinos from the racial categories and assigns them to a separate category. Hispanics/Latinos may be of any race.
Race / Ethnicity (NH = Non-Hispanic)	Pop 2000	Pop 2010	Pop 2020	% 2000	% 2010	% 2020
White alone (NH)	2,062	1,828	1,855	89.03%	85.26%	84.82%
Black or African American alone (NH)	5	7	3	0.22%	0.33%	0.14%
Native American or Alaska Native alone (NH)	44	41	18	1.90%	1.91%	0.82%
Asian alone (NH)	8	21	27	0.35%	0.98%	1.23%
Native Hawaiian or Pacific Islander alone (NH)	3	4	1	0.13%	0.19%	0.05%
Other race alone (NH)	0	2	4	0.00%	0.09%	0.18%
Mixed race or Multiracial (NH)	54	63	104	2.33%	2.94%	4.76%
Hispanic or Latino (any race)	140	178	175	6.04%	8.30%	8.00%
Total	2,316	2,144	2,187	100.00%	100.00%	100.00%

=== 2020 census ===
As of the 2020 census, Chester had a population of 2,187 and a population density of 300.1 inhabitants per square mile (115.9/km^{2}).

The racial makeup of Chester was 87.3% White, 0.1% African American, 0.9% Native American, 1.2% Asian, 0.0% Pacific Islander, 1.7% from other races, and 8.6% from two or more races. Hispanic or Latino of any race were 8.0% of the population.

The census reported that 98.9% of the population lived in households, 0.1% lived in non-institutionalized group quarters, and 1.0% were institutionalized. The median age was 53.3 years. The age distribution was 18.0% under the age of 18, 3.8% aged 18 to 24, 19.1% aged 25 to 44, 29.2% aged 45 to 64, and 29.9% who were 65 years of age or older. For every 100 females, there were 105.0 males, and for every 100 females age 18 and over there were 100.4 males age 18 and over.

There were 1,035 households, out of which 21.1% included children under the age of 18, 43.9% were married-couple households, 6.8% were cohabiting couple households, 25.2% had a female householder with no partner present, and 24.2% had a male householder with no partner present. 35.6% of households were one person, and 17.9% were one person aged 65 or older. The average household size was 2.09. There were 606 families (58.6% of all households).

There were 1,250 housing units at an average density of 171.5 units per square mile (66.2 units/km^{2}), of which 1,035 (82.8%) were occupied. Of these, 64.7% were owner-occupied, and 35.3% were occupied by renters. 17.2% of housing units were vacant, with a homeowner vacancy rate of 1.2% and a rental vacancy rate of 4.9%.

0.0% of residents lived in urban areas, while 100.0% lived in rural areas.

=== Income and poverty ===
In 2023, the US Census Bureau estimated that the median household income was $80,142, and the per capita income was $46,687. About 0.0% of families and 5.9% of the population were below the poverty line.

=== 2010 census ===
At the 2010 census Chester had a population of 2,144. The population density was 291.0 inhabitants per square mile (112.4/km^{2}). The racial makeup of Chester was 1,954 (91.1%) White, 10 (0.5%) African American, 46 (2.1%) Native American, 21 (1.0%) Asian, 4 (0.2%) Pacific Islander, 37 (1.7%) from other races, and 72 (3.4%) from two or more races. Hispanic or Latino of any race were 178 people (8.3%).

The census reported that 2,131 people (99.4% of the population) lived in households, 1 (0%) lived in non-institutionalized group quarters, and 12 (0.6%) were institutionalized.

There were 943 households, 249 (26.4%) had children under the age of 18 living in them, 454 (48.1%) were opposite-sex married couples living together, 81 (8.6%) had a female householder with no husband present, 46 (4.9%) had a male householder with no wife present. There were 73 (7.7%) unmarried opposite-sex partnerships, and 3 (0.3%) same-sex married couples or partnerships. 288 households (30.5%) were one person and 95 (10.1%) had someone living alone who was 65 or older. The average household size was 2.26. There were 581 families (61.6% of households); the average family size was 2.81.

The age distribution was 465 people (21.7%) under the age of 18, 154 people (7.2%) aged 18 to 24, 456 people (21.3%) aged 25 to 44, 758 people (35.4%) aged 45 to 64, and 311 people (14.5%) who were 65 or older. The median age was 44.9 years. For every 100 females, there were 101.7 males. For every 100 females age 18 and over, there were 98.7 males.

There were 1,237 housing units at an average density of 167.9 per square mile, of the occupied units 568 (60.2%) were owner-occupied and 375 (39.8%) were rented. The homeowner vacancy rate was 3.5%; the rental vacancy rate was 15.7%. 1,317 people (61.4% of the population) lived in owner-occupied housing units and 814 people (38.0%) lived in rental housing units.

== Activities and features ==
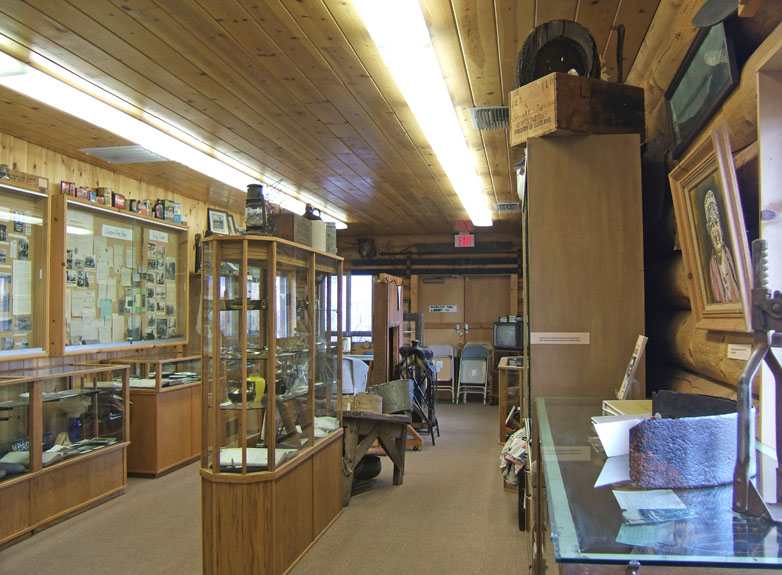
Chester Museum, an addition to the Chester Library.

Chester is near several areas of interest for outdoor activities, within a 50-mile radius the town has numerous CDF and USFS trails and campgrounds, Lassen Volcanic National Park, Drakesbad and Lake Almanor are other areas of interest for vacationers and tourists with outdoor hobbies. The Boy Scouts of America's Nevada Area Council also operates Camp Fleischmann in the region.

Lake Almanor is a popular hunting, fishing and boating destination. The lake is home for a variety of fish and bird species, many of which make for good sport and game. Chester and the greater Lake Almanor area are home to many seasonal and year-round resorts and restaurants that cater to the locals and the summer seasonal tourists. The winter tourism tends to be quieter, the town is often a way point for people traveling to ski resorts at Mount Shasta and Lake Tahoe.

== Economy ==
The primary industries in Chester are lumber production and tourism. Collins Pine (a division of The Collins Companies) has been in operation since the 1940s under a "sustained yield" management plan using selective harvesting. The company's forest management practices have been certified as FSC sustainable by Scientific Certification Systems, which designated it a "state-of-the-art well-managed forest." Collins no longer maintains the distinction of Chester's dominant employer, though it remains the single business with the most employees.

Other logging companies operating in the area are Roseburg Forest Products, and Sierra Pacific Industries. Clear cutting is performed in the area.

Lake Almanor has developed as a vacation/tourist destination and Chester serves as the retail center for the area. All of the Almanor basin's four gas stations are located in Chester, as well as the Almanor basin's only full-sized grocery store.

== Politics ==
In the state legislature, Chester is in the 1st senatorial district, represented by Republican Megan Dahle, and the 1st Assembly district, represented by Republican Heather Hadwick.

Federally, Chester is in California's 3rd congressional district, represented by Independent Kevin Kiley.

== Education ==
The school district is Plumas Unified School District. Chester Elementary School, Chester Junior Senior High School, and Almanor High School (continuation) are part of Plumas USD, based in Quincy.

The Chester Learning Center is a private charter school. It is accredited K-12 by the WASC, Western Association of Schools and Colleges and managed by the Plumas Charter School system.

== Notable people ==
- Chuck Norris (1940–2026), American actor whose wife Gena Norris was born in Chester. They had a vacation home in Chester.
- Tony Miller (born 1948), former California Secretary of State
- Marie Mason Potts (1895–1978), Mountain Maidu Native American journalist and activist; born in Big Meadows
