= Mineral, California =

Mineral
- Unincorporated Community; Census Designated Place
- Location in Tehama County and the state of California

- Location in the United States
- Coordinates: 40°21′20″N 121°34′2″W
- Country: United States
- State: California
- County: Tehama

Area
  - Total: 44.414 sq mi (115.031 km^{2})
  - Land: 44.303 sq mi (114.744 km^{2})
  - Water: 0.111 sq mi (0.287 km^{2}) 0.25%
- Elevation: 4,918 ft (1,499 m)

Population (2020)
  - Total: 136
  - Density: 3.07/sq mi (1.19/km^{2})
- Time zone: UTC-8 (Pacific)
  - Summer (DST): UTC-7 (PDT)
- ZIP codes: 96061, 96063
- Area code: 530
- FIPS code: 06-47794
- GNIS feature ID: 1659139

Mineral is a census-designated place (CDP) in Tehama County, California, United States. As of the 2020 census, Mineral had a population of 136.

== History ==
The community was named for mineral springs near the original town site. A post office at Mineral was established in 1894.

== Geography ==
Mineral is located at 40°21′20″N 121°34′2″W (40.355686, -121.567333).

According to the United States Census Bureau, the CDP has a total area of 44.4 square miles (115 km^{2}), of which 44.3 square miles (115 km^{2}) is land and 0.1 square miles (0.26 km^{2}) (0.25%) is water.

=== Climate ===
Mineral experiences warm and dry summers and cool, extremely snowy winters. According to the Köppen climate classification system, Mineral has a warm-summer Mediterranean climate (Csb).

Climate data for Mineral, California, 1991–2020 normals, extremes 1914–present
Month	Jan	Feb	Mar	Apr	May	Jun	Jul	Aug	Sep	Oct	Nov	Dec	Year
Record high °F (°C)	66 (19)	69 (21)	73 (23)	81 (27)	94 (34)	100 (38)	100 (38)	100 (38)	100 (38)	88 (31)	77 (25)	70 (21)	100 (38)
Mean maximum °F (°C)	53.8 (12.1)	55.1 (12.8)	62.0 (16.7)	70.6 (21.4)	79.3 (26.3)	87.0 (30.6)	91.5 (33.1)	90.9 (32.7)	87.6 (30.9)	78.4 (25.8)	64.2 (17.9)	53.4 (11.9)	94.0 (34.4)
Mean daily maximum °F (°C)	41.9 (5.5)	43.8 (6.6)	47.8 (8.8)	53.8 (12.1)	62.8 (17.1)	72.2 (22.3)	81.5 (27.5)	80.8 (27.1)	74.7 (23.7)	63.7 (17.6)	48.8 (9.3)	41.8 (5.4)	59.5 (15.3)
Daily mean °F (°C)	32.3 (0.2)	33.4 (0.8)	37.0 (2.8)	41.3 (5.2)	48.4 (9.1)	56.2 (13.4)	62.8 (17.1)	61.5 (16.4)	56.2 (13.4)	47.5 (8.6)	37.6 (3.1)	32.8 (0.4)	45.6 (7.5)
Mean daily minimum °F (°C)	22.5 (−5.3)	23.1 (−4.9)	26.2 (−3.2)	28.8 (−1.8)	34.0 (1.1)	40.1 (4.5)	44.1 (6.7)	42.2 (5.7)	37.7 (3.2)	31.3 (−0.4)	26.4 (−3.1)	23.5 (−4.7)	31.7 (−0.2)
Mean minimum °F (°C)	7.3 (−13.7)	9.2 (−12.7)	13.3 (−10.4)	17.6 (−8.0)	24.3 (−4.3)	29.8 (−1.2)	35.5 (1.9)	34.4 (1.3)	29.3 (−1.5)	23.5 (−4.7)	15.3 (−9.3)	9.5 (−12.5)	5.7 (−14.6)
Record low °F (°C)	−13 (−25)	−7 (−22)	−2 (−19)	5 (−15)	13 (−11)	21 (−6)	27 (−3)	22 (−6)	19 (−7)	15 (−9)	0 (−18)	−9 (−23)	−13 (−25)
Average precipitation inches (mm)	8.89 (226)	8.50 (216)	8.06 (205)	4.34 (110)	3.16 (80)	1.31 (33)	0.20 (5.1)	0.18 (4.6)	1.01 (26)	3.55 (90)	6.80 (173)	10.49 (266)	56.49 (1,434.7)
Average snowfall inches (cm)	31.1 (79)	29.5 (75)	30.0 (76)	16.2 (41)	1.3 (3.3)	0.1 (0.25)	0.0 (0.0)	0.0 (0.0)	0.0 (0.0)	0.9 (2.3)	6.1 (15)	27.7 (70)	142.9 (361.85)
Average precipitation days (≥ 0.01 in)	12.5	12.3	12.5	10.3	7.9	3.8	0.8	1.0	2.2	4.5	10.2	11.7	89.7
Average snowy days (≥ 0.1 in)	7.5	7.3	7.1	4.9	0.6	0.1	0.0	0.0	0.0	0.4	2.8	6.9	37.6
Source: NOAA

== Demographics ==
Historical population
Census	Pop.	Note	%±
2000	143		—
2010	123		−14.0%
2020	136		10.6%
U.S. Decennial Census; 1860–1870 1880-1890; 1900 1910 1920; 1930 1940 1950; 1960 1970 1980; 1990 2000 2010

Mineral first appeared as a census designated place in the 2000 U.S. census.

=== 2020 ===
The 2020 United States census reported that Mineral had a population of 136. The population density was 3.1 inhabitants per square mile (1.2/km^{2}). The racial makeup of Mineral was 119 (87.5%) White, 2 (1.5%) African American, 3 (2.2%) Native American, 0 (0.0%) Asian, 0 (0.0%) Pacific Islander, 6 (4.4%) from other races, and 6 (4.4%) from two or more races. Hispanic or Latino of any race were 10 persons (7.4%).

The whole population lived in households. There were 80 households, out of which 24 (30.0%) had children under the age of 18 living in them, 42 (52.5%) were married-couple households, 9 (11.3%) were cohabiting couple households, 14 (17.5%) had a female householder with no partner present, and 15 (18.8%) had a male householder with no partner present. 18 households (22.5%) were one person, and 10 (12.5%) were one person aged 65 or older. The average household size was 1.7. There were 56 families (70.0% of all households).

The age distribution was 10 people (7.4%) under the age of 18, 6 people (4.4%) aged 18 to 24, 38 people (27.9%) aged 25 to 44, 29 people (21.3%) aged 45 to 64, and 53 people (39.0%) who were 65 years of age or older. The median age was 59.8 years. There were 75 males and 61 females.

There were 396 housing units at an average density of 8.9 units per square mile (3.4 units/km^{2}), of which 80 (20.2%) were occupied. Of these, 58 (72.5%) were owner-occupied, and 22 (27.5%) were occupied by renters.

=== 2010 ===
At the 2010 census Mineral had a population of 123. The population density was 2.8 people per square mile (1.1/km^{2}). The racial makeup of Mineral was 115 (93.5%) White, 0 (0.0%) African American, 1 (0.8%) Native American, 1 (0.8%) Asian, 0 (0.0%) Pacific Islander, 1 (0.8%) from other races, and 5 (4.1%) from two or more races. Hispanic or Latino of any race were 4 people (3.3%).

The whole population lived in households, no one lived in non-institutionalized group quarters and no one was institutionalized.

There were 64 households, 11 (17.2%) had children under the age of 18 living in them, 36 (56.3%) were opposite-sex married couples living together, 0 (0%) had a female householder with no husband present, 0 (0%) had a male householder with no wife present. There were 3 (4.7%) unmarried opposite-sex partnerships, and 0 (0%) same-sex married couples or partnerships. 24 households (37.5%) were one person and 6 (9.4%) had someone living alone who was 65 or older. The average household size was 1.92. There were 36 families (56.3% of households); the average family size was 2.53.

The age distribution was 19 people (15.4%) under the age of 18, 2 people (1.6%) aged 18 to 24, 21 people (17.1%) aged 25 to 44, 53 people (43.1%) aged 45 to 64, and 28 people (22.8%) who were 65 or older. The median age was 50.8 years. For every 100 females, there were 105.0 males. For every 100 females age 18 and over, there were 103.9 males.

There were 466 housing units at an average density of 10.5 per square mile, of the occupied units 40 (62.5%) were owner-occupied and 24 (37.5%) were rented. The homeowner vacancy rate was 4.8%; the rental vacancy rate was 4.0%. 73 people (59.3% of the population) lived in owner-occupied housing units and 50 people (40.7%) lived in rental housing units.

=== 2000 ===
At the 2000 census, the median household income was $39,107 and the median family income was $42,813. Males had a median income of $40,938 versus $27,083 for females. The per capita income for the CDP was $20,865. There were 10.4% of families and 12.1% of the population living below the poverty line, including 3.8% of under eighteens and 27.8% of those over 64.

== Politics ==
In the California State Legislature, Tehama County is in the 1st Senate District, represented by Republican Megan Dahle, and the 3rd Assembly District, represented by Republican James Gallagher.

Federally, Mineral is in California's 1st congressional district, represented by Republican James Gallagher.
