= Lake Helen (California) =

Lake in the state of California, United States

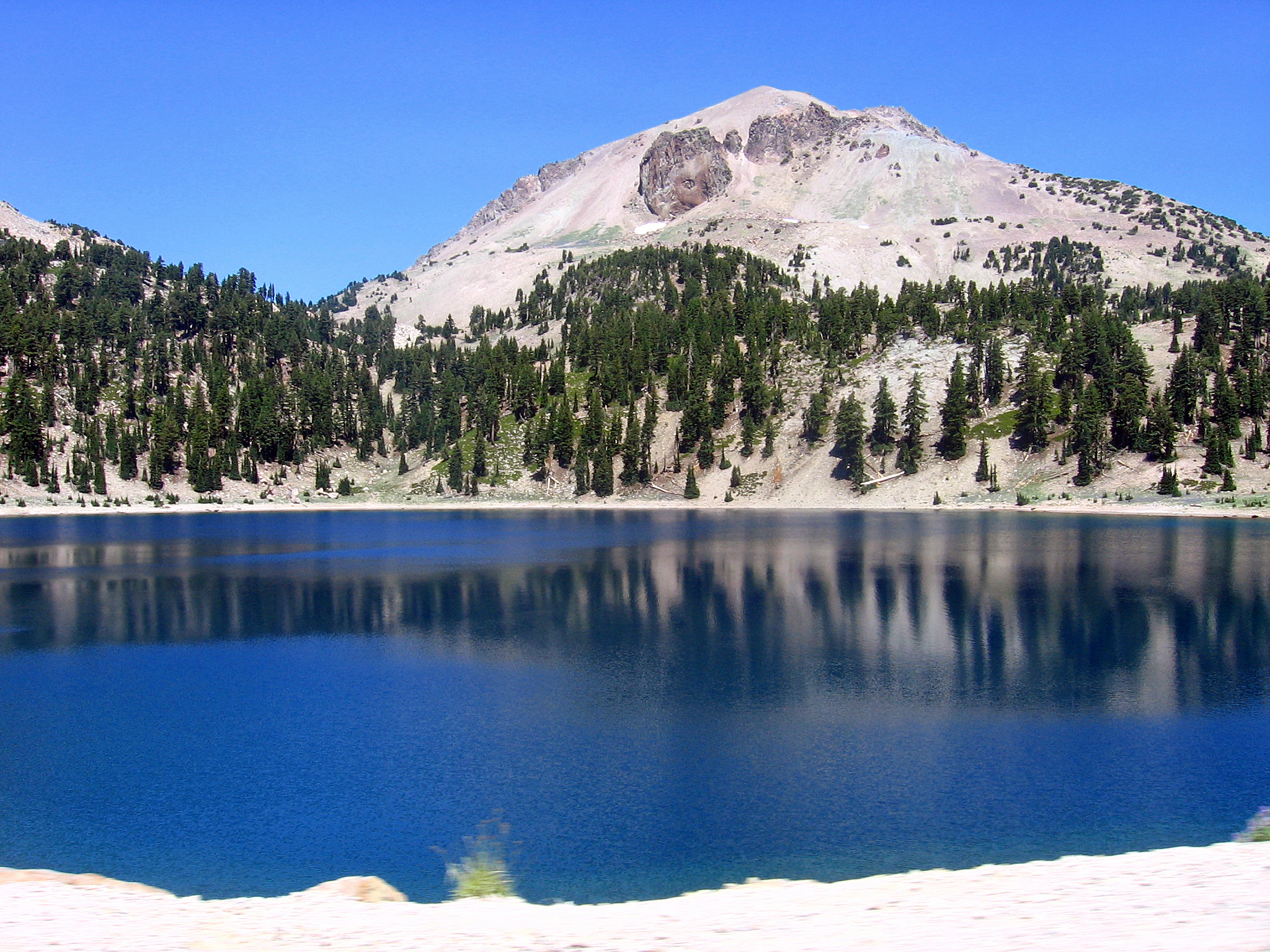
- Lake Helen as seen from the highway

- Location within California Location within the United States
- Location: Lassen Volcanic National Park, Shasta County, California, US
- Coordinates: 40°28′07″N 121°30′36″W
- Basin countries: United States
- Surface elevation: 8,200 ft (2,500 m)
- Frozen: October/November to June - August

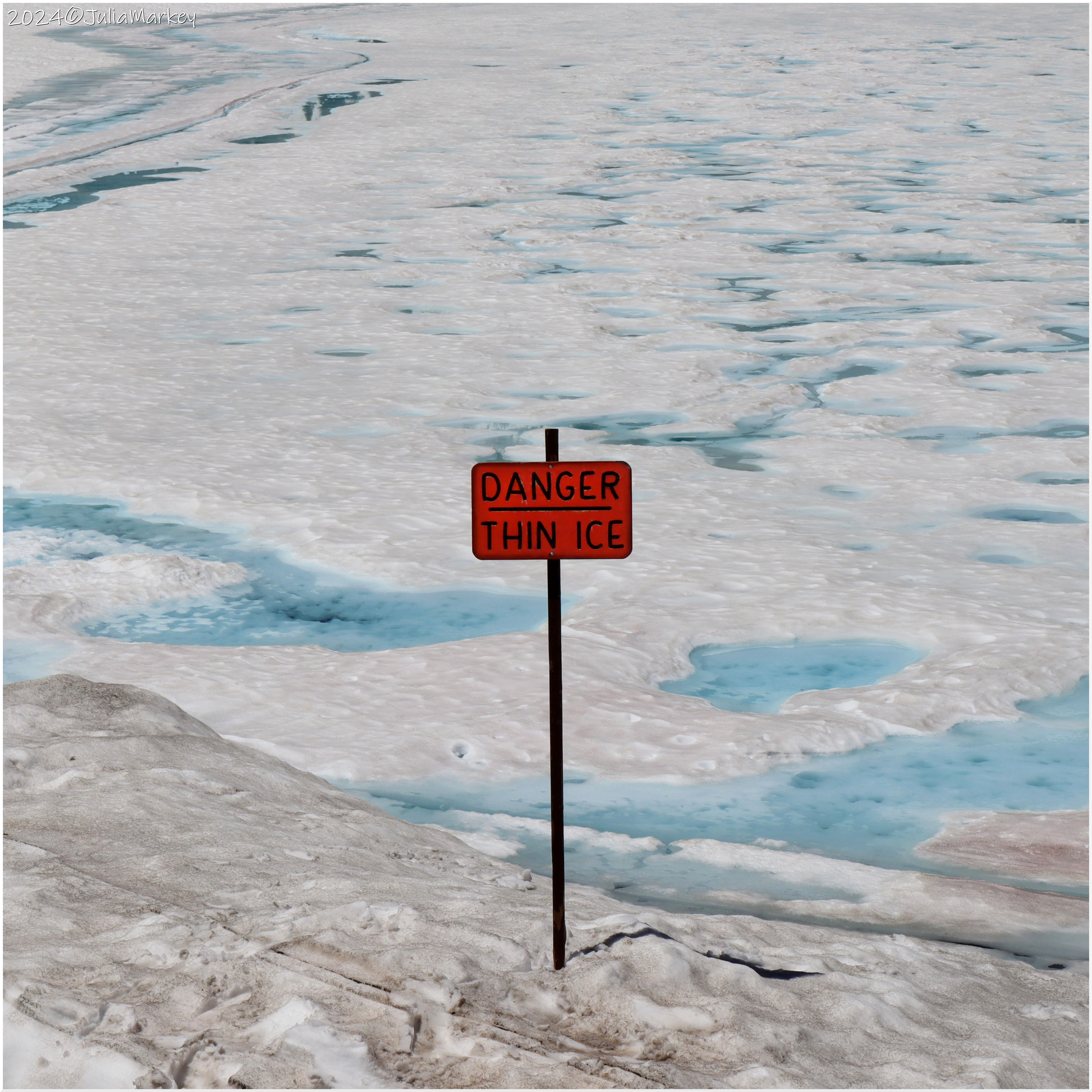
Lake Helen in Lassen Volcanic National Park in June of 2024.

Lake Helen is a glacial lake or a tarn occupying a cirque at around 8,200 feet (2,500 m) in Lassen Volcanic National Park. The lake is located to the south of Lassen Peak and west of Bumpass Mountain in the Shasta Cascades region of Northern California. Highway 89 runs along the lake's southern and eastern shore. The lake is named for Helen Tanner Brodt who in 1864 became the first white woman to reach the summit of Lassen Peak.

== Climate ==
Since the lake is at a high elevation (over 8,000 feet (2,438 m)), the lake is frozen and covered in deep snow for most of the year. Ice usually forms sometime around October–November and remains until July–August. During winter, Pacific storms come in from the west and bedeck the lake with copious amounts of snowfall. Annual snowfall at the lake is around 600–700 inches (15.24–17.78 m), making it the snowiest place in California. The maximum average snow depth for the lake is 178 inches (4.52 m), though sometimes it could reach over 315 inches (8.0 m).

== View from highway 89 ==
View of Lake Helen in June 2020

== See also ==
- List of lakes in California
