= Juniper Lake (Lassen Peak) =

Lake in the state of California, United States

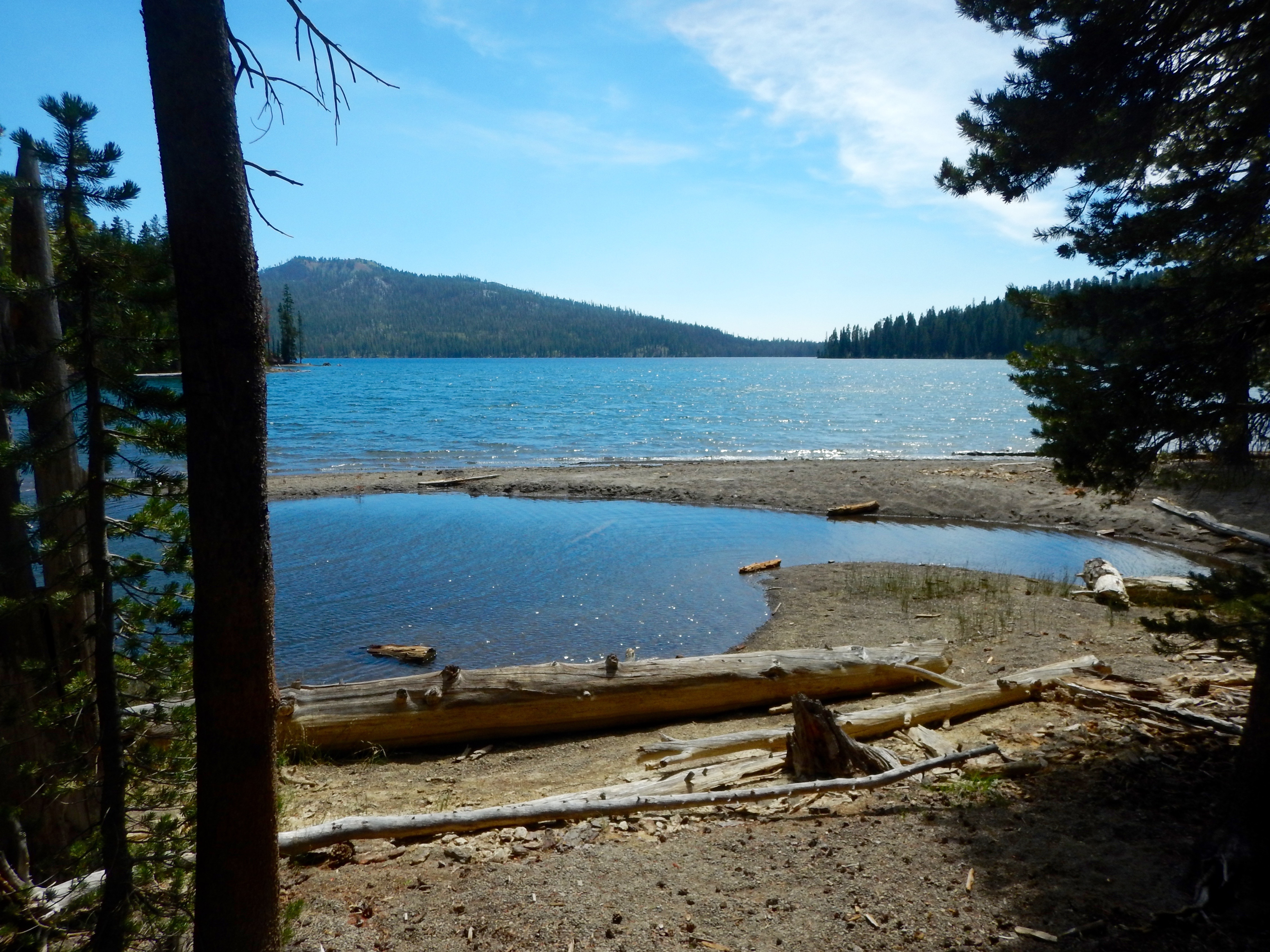

- Location within California Location within the United States
- Location: Lassen Volcanic National Park, Lassen / Plumas counties, California, United States
- Coordinates: 40°27′12″N 121°18′29″W
- Basin countries: United States
- Surface elevation: 6,700 ft (2,040 m)

Juniper Lake is a large lake located at the southeast corner of Lassen Volcanic National Park in the U.S. state of California. The lake sits at an elevation of 6,700 ft (2,040 m) above sea level. There is a campground and a ranger station located on the eastern shore of the lake, and a campground and private cabins located on the northern shore. The lake is accessible by an unpaved road from Chester.

== See also ==
- List of lakes in California
