= Reflection Lake =

Lake of Lassen Volcanic National Park in California

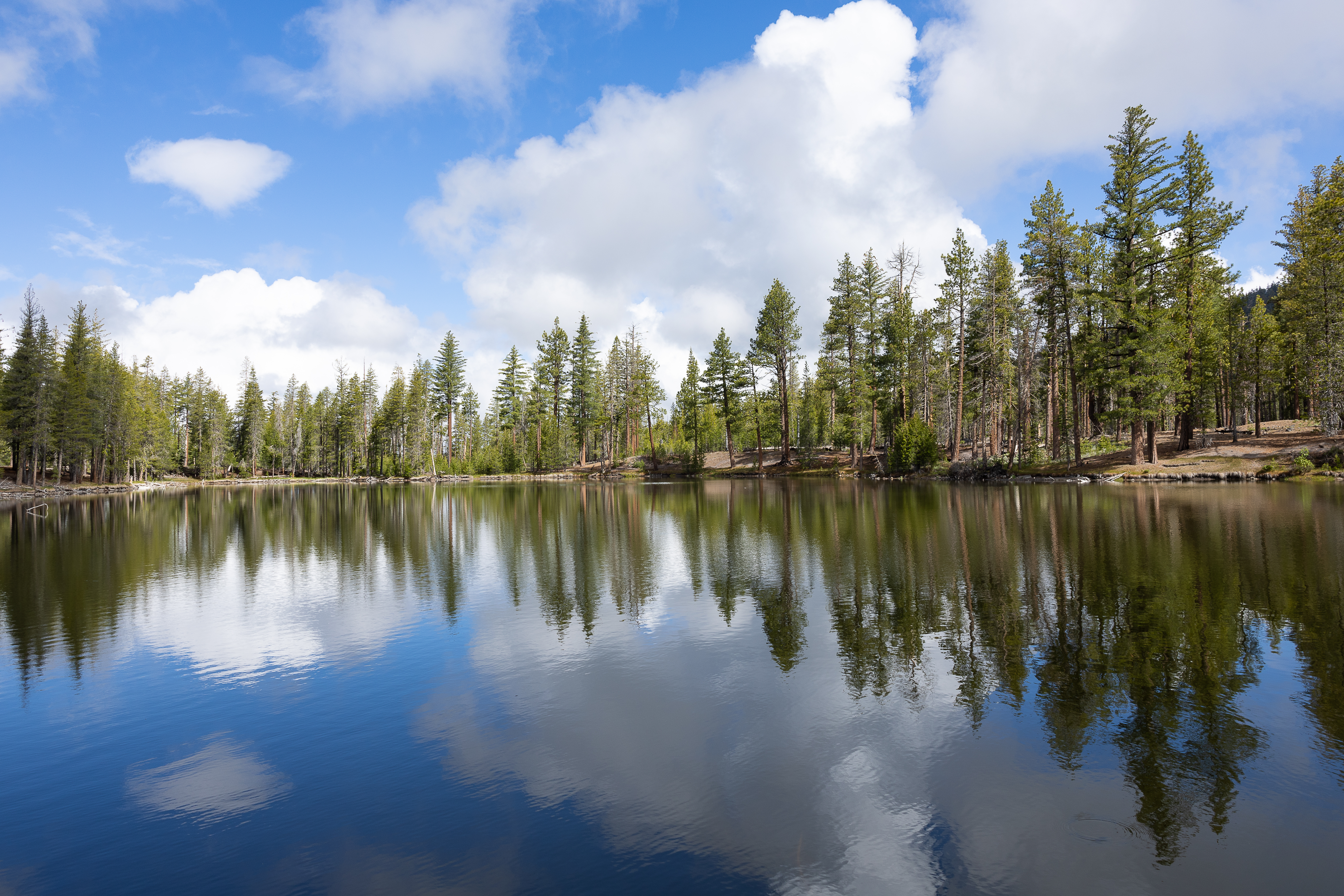
- Reflection Lake, June 2022

- Location within California Location within the United States
- Location: Lassen Volcanic National Park, Shasta County, California, US
- Coordinates: 40.5373111°N 121.5655760°W
- Basin countries: United States

Reflection Lake is a lake in Lassen Volcanic National Park.

== History ==
In the late 1800s, the lake was lower in level and more indicative of a pond and was aptly named, Mud Lake. To attract more people to the area, a channel was dug to divert water from nearby Manzanita Creek into Mud Lake. Trout were planted in the lake with an increased water level. For a few years, people paid the landowner to fish in the lake. Eventually, trout planting ceased.

In 1926, park benefactor Benjamin Franklin Loomis purchased 40 acres, which included the lake. Reflection Lake was one location that Loomis captured photographs of the 1914–1915 Lassen Peak eruptions. Loomis and his wife Estella donated their 40 acres, the Loomis Museum, and the adjacent seismograph building to the park in 1929.

== Ecology ==
A healthy population of native tui chub fish thrive in the warmer water. Fish stocking ended completely in the park in the early 1990s to preserve natural riparian ecosystems. As a result, the lake attracts water birds such as Canada geese, great blue heron, snowy egret, and kingfisher.

Low levels of dissolved oxygen have been recorded in the lake.

== Reflection Lake Route ==
A half-mile route (not a defined trail) circles the lake and is a shorter alternative to the 1.8-mile Manzanita Lake Loop. The western shore offers unobstructed views of Chaos Crags and Lassen Peak, which are often reflected in the still lake. The route overlaps with the half-mile Lily Pond Interpretive Trail on the eastern shore of Reflection Lake.
