= Rockspirea =

Rockspirea is a common name for several plants in the rose family native to western North America and may refer to:

- Holodiscus dumosus
- Petrophytum
