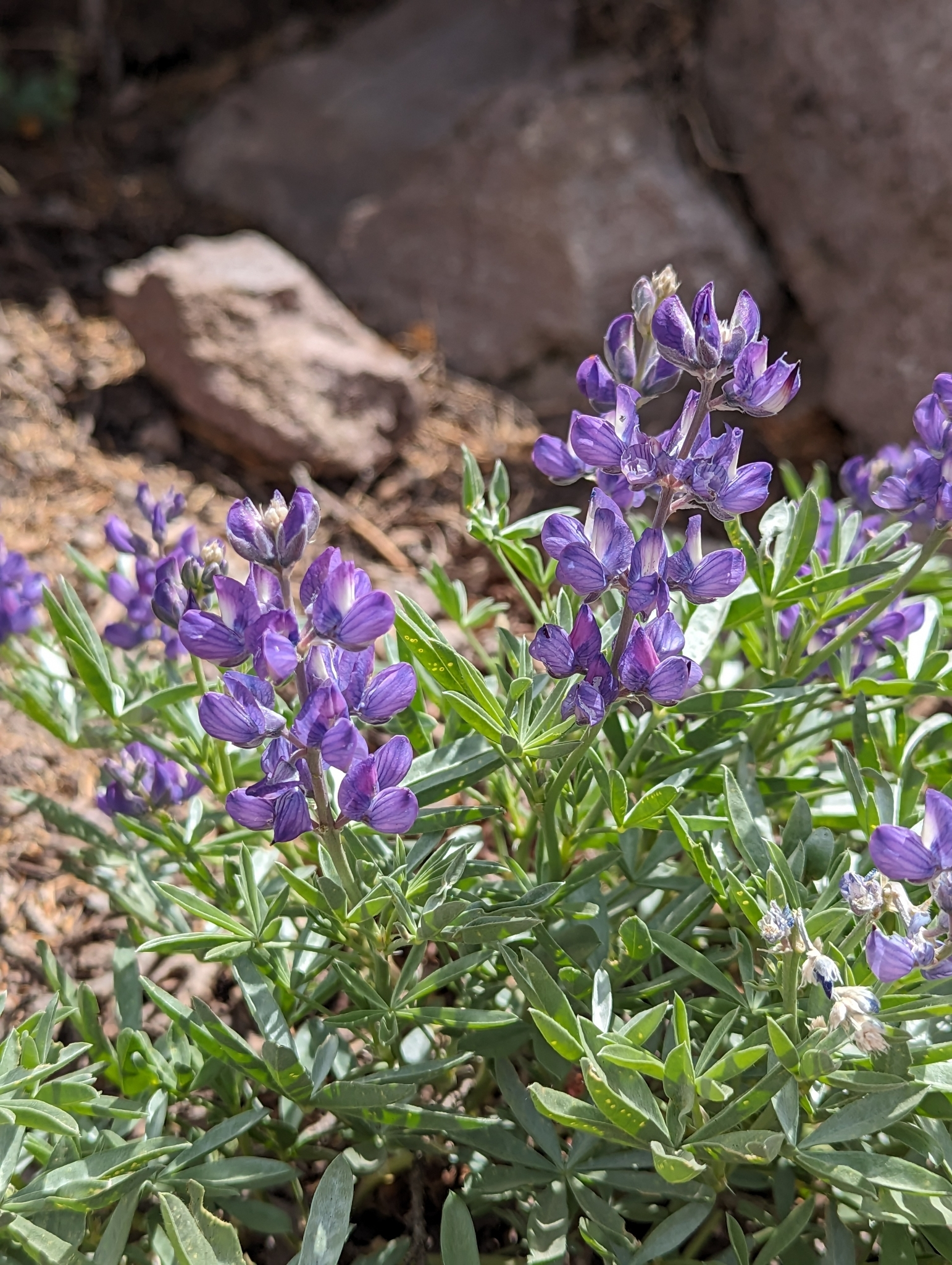

Scientific classification
- Kingdom: Plantae
- Clade: Tracheophytes
- Clade: Angiosperms
- Clade: Eudicots
- Clade: Rosids
- Order: Fabales
- Family: Fabaceae
- Subfamily: Faboideae
- Genus: Lupinus
- Species: L. obtusilobus

Binomial name
- Lupinus obtusilobus A.Heller

= Lupinus obtusilobus =

Species of legume

Lupinus obtusilobus is a species of lupine also known by the common names bluntlobe lupine and satin lupine. It is native to high mountains of northern California, including the North Coast Ranges, the Klamath Mountains, and the northernmost Sierra Nevada. It grows in various types of mountain habitat, sometimes carpeting meadows with its purple blooms in the spring. It is a perennial herb growing erect or decumbent along the ground, its stem 15–30 centimetres (5.9–11.8 in) long. Each palmate leaf is made up of 6 to 7 leaflets up to 5 centimetres (2.0 in) long. The herbage is coated in silvery silky hairs. The inflorescence is a small raceme with a few whorls of flowers each just over a centimeter long. The flower is blue to purple with a yellowish patch on its banner. The fruit is a silky-haired legume pod up to 4 centimetres (1.6 in) long.
