= Chaos Crags =

Mountain in the Cascade range in California

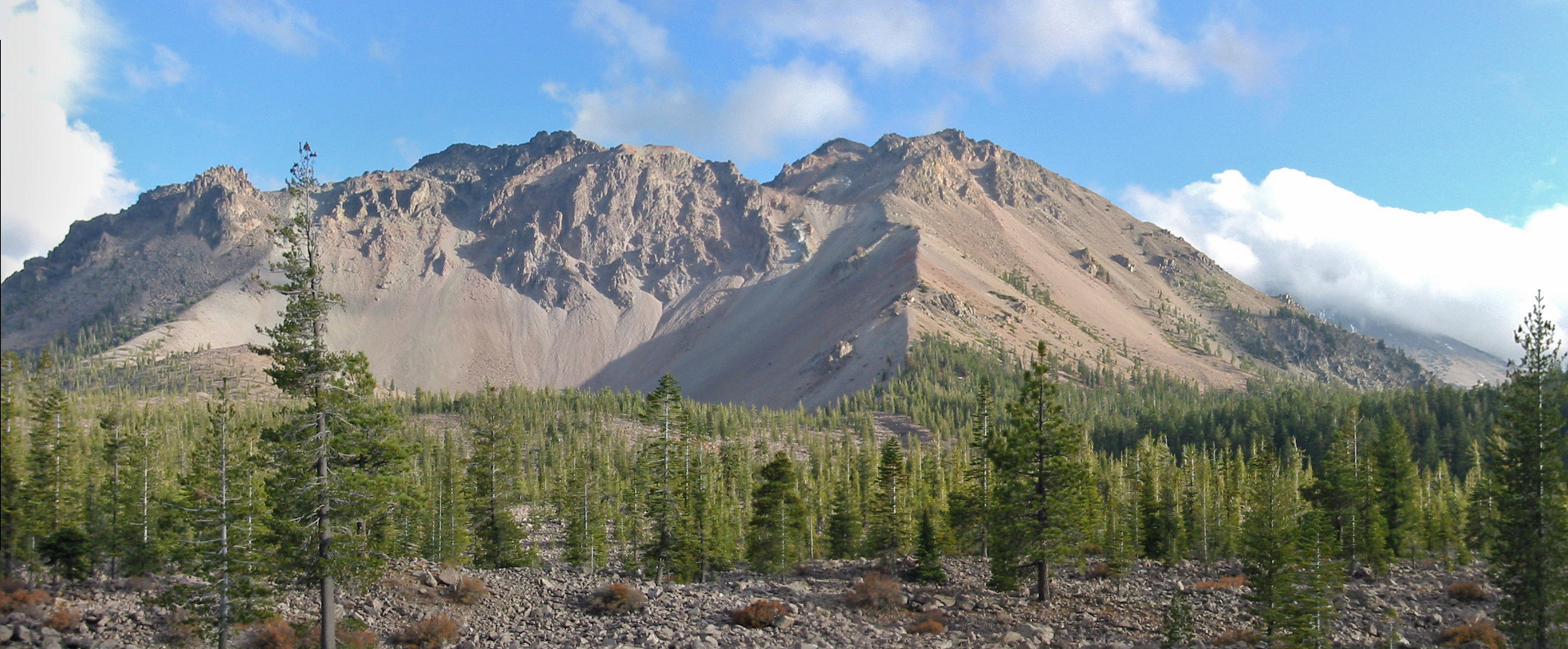
- Chaos Crags with Chaos Jumbles below.

Highest point
- Elevation: 8,448 ft (2,575 m)
- Prominence: 581 ft (177 m)
- Coordinates: 40°31′27″N 121°31′20″W

Geography
- Location: Lassen Volcanic National Park, Shasta County, California, U.S.
- Parent range: Cascade Range
- Topo map: USGS Manzanita Lake

Geology
- Formed by: Subduction zone volcanism
- Rock age: Holocene
- Mountain type: Lava domes
- Volcanic arc: Cascade Volcanic Arc

Chaos Crags is the youngest group of lava domes in Lassen Volcanic National Park, California. They formed as six dacite domes about 1,000 years ago, one dome collapsing during an explosive eruption about 70 years later. The eruptions at the Chaos Crags mark one of just three instances of Holocene activity within the Lassen volcanic center. The cluster of domes is located north of Lassen Peak and form part of the southernmost segment of the Cascade Range in Northern California. Each year, a lake forms at the base of the Crags, and typically dries by the end of the summer season.

From the base of the crags and extending toward the northwest corner of the park is Chaos Jumbles, a rock avalanche that undermined Chaos Crags' northwest slope 300 years ago. Riding on a cushion of compressed air (see sturzstrom), the rock debris traveled at about 100 miles per hour (160 km/h), flattened the forest before it, and dammed Manzanita Creek, forming Manzanita Lake. In addition to the possibility of forming additional lava domes, future activity at the Chaos Crags could pose hazards from pumice, pyroclastic flows, or rockfalls. Geological study of the Chaos Crags, which continues today, began in the late 1920s, when Howel Williams wrote about its pyroclastic rock deposits, rockfall avalanches, and eruptions. The area is monitored for rockslide threats, which could threaten the local area.

The Crags and the surrounding area's lakes and forests support numerous plant and animal species. The area is not a popular destination for visitors, despite its accessibility. The Chaos Crags and Crags Lake Trail, which lasts about three hours round-trip, offers views of volcanic phenomena nearby, as well as the Hat Creek valley and the Thousand Lakes Wilderness.

== Geography ==
The Chaos Crags form part of the southernmost segment of the Cascade Range in Northern California. They lie in the northwest corner of the Lassen Volcanic National Park, in Shasta County. Located 2 miles (3.2 km) to the north of Lassen Peak, they have an elevation of about 8,448 feet (2,575 m).^{[a]} The Lassen Volcanic National Park area is surrounded by the Lassen National Forest, which has an area of 1,200,000 acres (4,900 km^{2}). Nearby towns include Mineral in Tehama County and Viola in Shasta County.

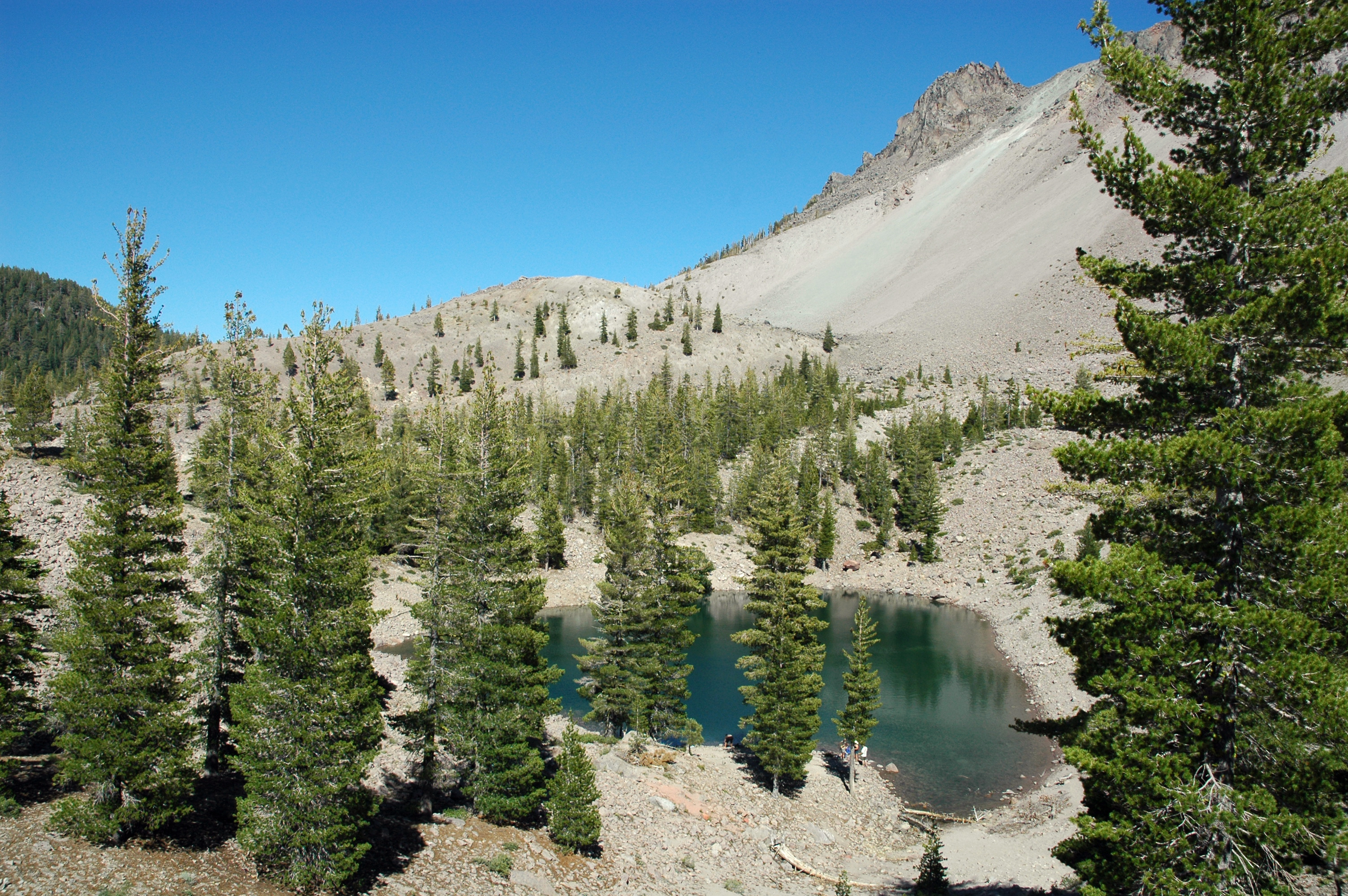
Crags Lake in the summer of 2011.

At the base of the Crags, a lake forms temporarily each year. Known as the Crags Lake or the Chaos Crater, it forms in a depression that acts as a basin to collect melted snow during the spring season. The lake has cool temperatures near the shores, and grows colder near its center. It usually dries up by the end of August.

== Geology ==
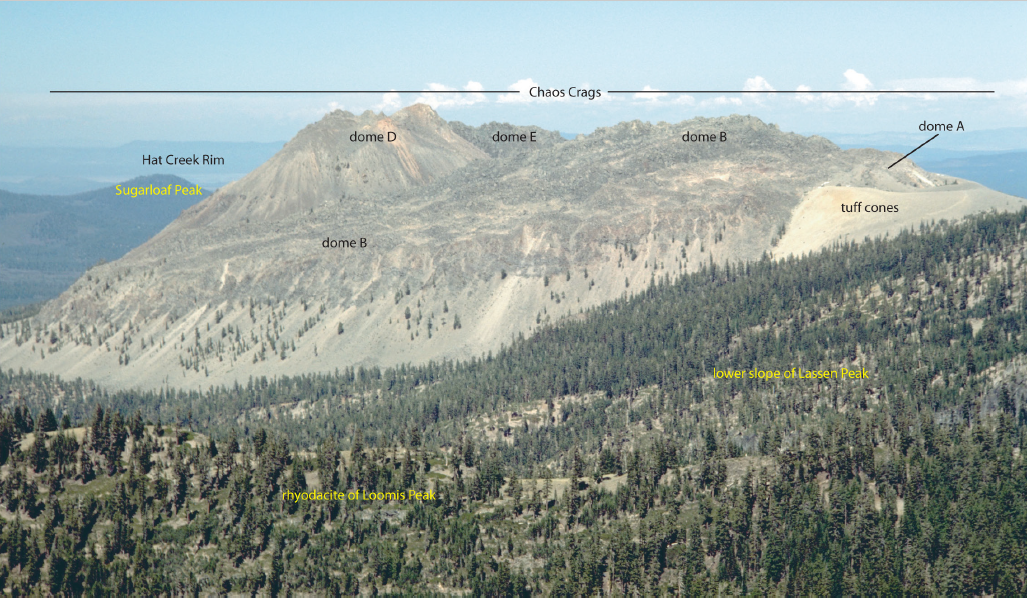
The six rhyodacite lava domes of Chaos Crags, where C and F are behind D and E.

Between 385,000 and 315,000 years ago, volcanic activity in the Lassen volcanic center shifted dramatically from building andesitic stratovolcanoes to producing lava domes made of dacite. These eruptions formed the Lassen dome field, staged as andesite lava flows surrounding two sequences of dacitic lava domes. The first sequence of lava domes, known as the Bumpass domes, formed between 300,000 and 190,000 years ago, while the production of the younger Eagle Peak domes began about 70,000 years ago. The andesite lava flows form the older and younger Twin Lakes sequences, and date to between 315,000 and 240,000 years ago and between 90,000 years ago and present, respectively. Beginning 190,000 years ago, eruptions ceased in the Lassen Volcanic center for 100,000 years. Dacitic magma at the Lassen center formed from mafic (rich in magnesium and iron) magma meeting silicic (high in silicon dioxide) magma chambers with felsic (rich in feldspar and quartz) phenocrysts. Some dacitic crystals were partially reabsorbed as a result of mixing of hot mafic magma with cool dacitic magma, and this along with undercooling of mixed magma led to phenocryst variation within certain domes exceeding variation between the domes. All three sequences — Bumpass, Eagle Peak, and Twin Lakes — formed from lava subjected to magma-mixing processes, accounting for their heterogeneous appearance and composition. Because of these mixing mechanisms, lavas may have different compositions but similar appearances, or similar compositions with different appearances. The eruption that produced the Chaos Crags consisted of more than 90% mixed magma, and likely resulted from the interaction of felsic and mafic magmas.

The Eagle Peak Sequence, which includes the Chaos Crags, consists of seven dacite and rhyodacite lava domes and lava flows, along with pyroclastic rock deposits. The Chaos Crags consist of five small lava domes, made of rhyodacite, which line up with the western edge of the Mount Tehama caldera. The youngest part of the Lassen volcanic center's dome field and the youngest domes in the Eagle Peak sequence, they reach an elevation of about 1,800 feet (550 m) above their surroundings. They lack a summit crater.

The domes began forming about 1,100 years ago, beginning with vent-opening eruptions, then vigorous explosive eruptions of pumice and ash followed by effusive activity. This created unstable edifices that partially collapsed and formed pyroclastic flows, similar to the most recent eruptions at the Mono–Inyo Craters. Two of the pyroclastic flows were deposited as one unit, and pumice fell to build a tuff cone at the northern edge of the Crags, while lava dome A formed and magma in the eruptive conduit cooled to plug the eruptive vent. Domes B through F followed in that order, though their exact ages remain unclear. Lasting from 1,125 to 1,060 years ago, this eruptive phase resembled the Lassen Peak eruptions in May 1915, though the Chaos Crag eruption had a magnitude 100 times greater, with an output volume of 0.34 cubic miles (1.4 km^{3}). The eruptions also created a cone made of tephra material, along with two pyroclastic flows, which had a volume of about 0.036 cubic miles (0.15 km^{3}). Six domes were originally formed, though after 70 years of quiescence, one was destroyed by a violent eruption that produced a pyroclastic flow and tephra deposits that can be detected in Manzanita and Lost Creeks. Of the five remaining domes, two have had landslides at their domes. The dome-forming eruptions at Chaos Crags, along with the eruption of Cinder Cone and the 1914–1921 eruptions of Lassen Peak, constitute the only Holocene activity within the Lassen volcanic center. The Chaos Crags event may have been fed by the same reservoir of crystal-containing magma as the 25,000 BCE and 1914–1921 eruptions at Lassen Peak, based on shared zircon age spectra, composition, and phenocryst makeup, suggesting that they have all been fed by the same reservoir of crystal-containing magma. This magma chamber has recycled old magma cooling for many thousands of years, eventually heating the mixture so that it can be erupted.

Unlike Lassen Peak, which has been altered by glaciers, the Chaos Crags have been unaffected by erosion. Their surfaces remain sharp with protrusions.

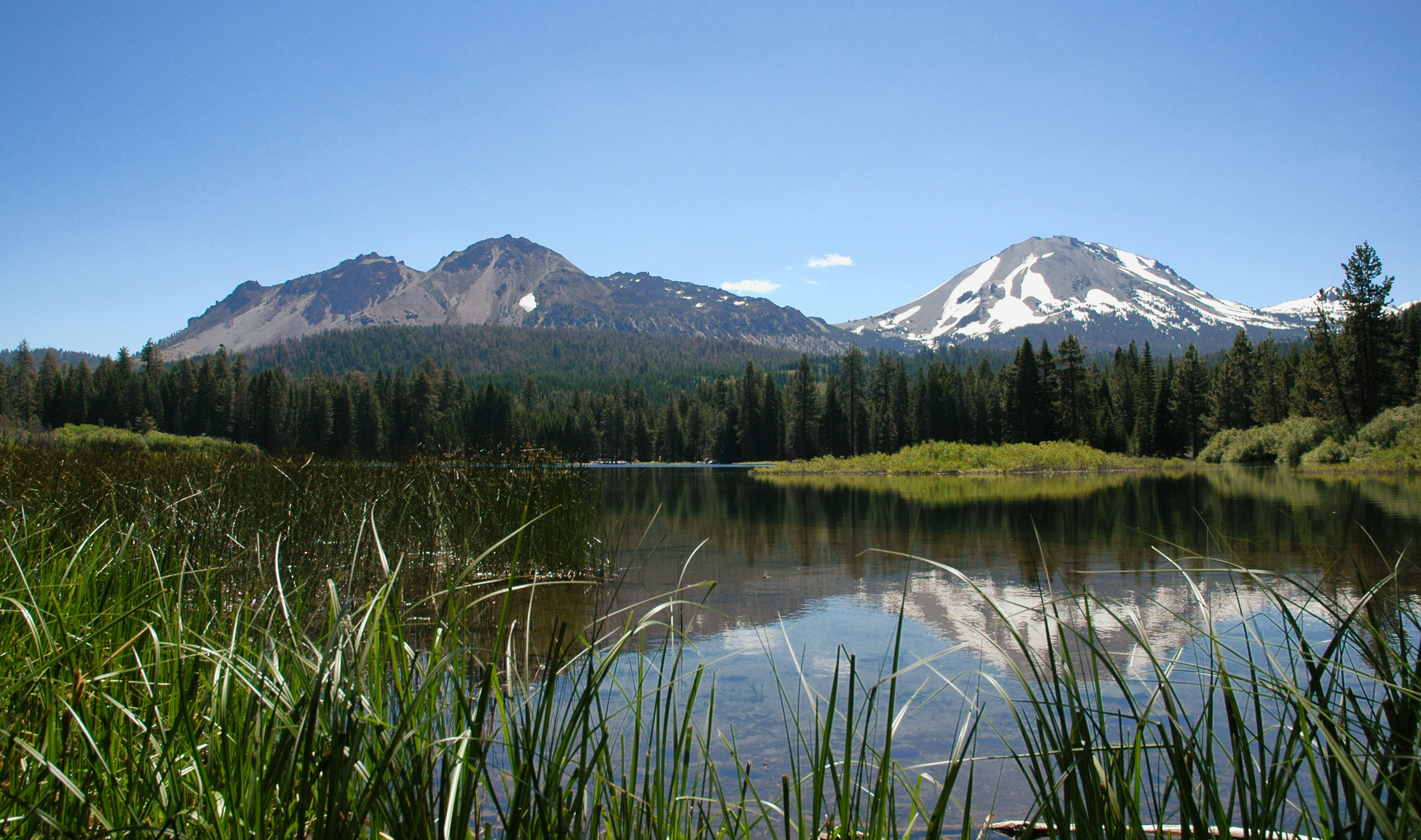
Chaos Crags and Lassen Peak seen from the side of Manzanita Lake

Unlike the vesicular and aphyric pyroclastic rock at Glass Mountain and Little Glass Mountain, lava deposits from the Chaos Crags are porphyritic with average vesicularity values at about 30%. Most of these vesicles exhibit oval shapes. Pumice from the eruption has high phenocryst content, with crystals of plagioclase, hornblende, biotite, quartz, and magnetite; it also has low vesicularity values.

Dome F, the last dome to form, consists of porphyritic rhyodacite, with hornblende and biotite. The lava deposits are dense, with white, light-gray, and medium-gray colors and glassy to devitrified textures. The deposits also contain large amounts of quartz, especially pyroxene-rimmed quartz crystals, with sparse appearance of olivine and calcic-plagioclase xenocrysts. At dome E, the penultimate dome to be produced, non-bedded deposits with fine, granular pieces to blocks with lengths of up to 6.6 feet (2 m) occur, and many of the larger blocks have internal fractures. Domes D, C, and A have compositions that are extremely similar to dome F; dome B, too, is similar, but also has pumice deposits and mafic inclusions. At dome E and dome D, there are also talus blocks as large as 13 feet (4 m) in length. Partial collapses have taken place at dome D and E. There are three distinct pyroclastic flow deposits, one of which occurs underneath dome B but on top of dome A, and has coarse pumice of a white to gray color. The other two pyroclastic deposits, which were deposited as a single unit and closely resemble each other, feature fine pumice blocks in a gray to yellow matrix, with pink color on the tops of the rocks. Both units were emplaced before dome A and contain charcoalized wood dated to about 1,125 ± 15 years old.

== Chaos Jumbles ==
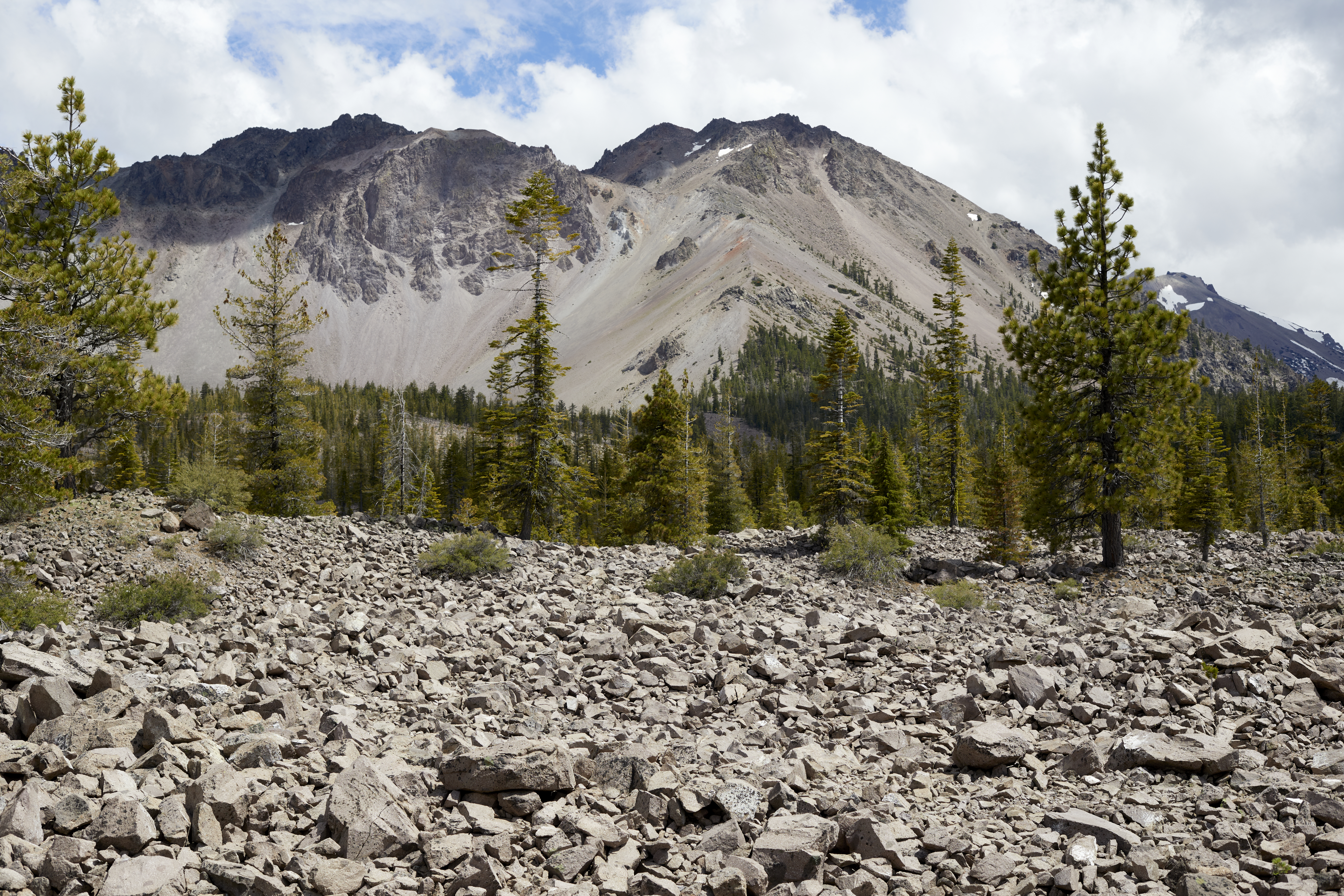
The Chaos Crags, with the Chaos Jumbles in the foreground

Roughly 350 years ago, one of the Chaos Crags domes collapsed to produce the Chaos Jumbles, an area where three enormous rockfalls in rapid succession transformed the local area and traveled as far as 4 miles (6.4 km) down the dome's slopes. The cause remains uncertain, but might have been an earthquake. The largest rockslide moved 400 feet (120 m) up nearby Table Mountain, then deflected and moved west. The rockslide moved at about 100 miles per hour (160 km/h), partly moving on a cushion of compressed air, which lowered friction. The formation of the Jumbles covered 4.5 square miles (12 km^{2}) with volcanic blocks, causing the formation of Manzanita Lake by damming Manzanita Creek. The rockfall impeded soil development and tree growth in the Chaos Jumbles area, which has been slower than in the Devastated Area near Lassen Peak.

The Chaos Jumbles deposits from the collapsed dome consist of lobed, non-bedded coarse to fine rubble, with blocks reaching widths of 16 feet (5 m). The debris includes pink, oxidized rhyodacite lava blocks, with rare prismatically jointed, gray blocks and andesite deposits from Mount Tehama.

=== Potential hazards and monitoring ===
In a 1974 report by the United States Geological Survey, scientists wrote that "some of the most catastrophic geologic events of the recent past resulted directly or indirectly from volcanism at the site of the Chaos Crags." Pyroclastic flows and avalanches from the formation reached the areas where parts of the Manzanita Lake visitor center facilities now reside. If the Chaos Crags resumed activity, they could erupt pumice, pyroclastic flows, or swift rockfalls, in addition to creating lava domes, though these would not pose major threats to human life should the surrounding area be evacuated promptly. These pyroclastic flows could reach regions directly surrounding the eruptive volcanic vent, and would extend at least 9.3 miles (15 km) into the nearby valley floors. The extent of tephra deposits would depend on wind strength and directions. However, given the sudden nature of rockfall-avalanches, these would be more dangerous than pyroclastic flows or tephra, as they could occur without warning, seriously endangering life within 3.1 miles (5 km) of the Crags.

The Chaos Crags are monitored for movement in case of future rockslides by the United States Geological Survey; GPS receivers have been in place to monitor deformation within the Lassen volcanic center since 2008. Thirteen seismometers in the vicinity, first installed in 1976 and since updated each decade, continually survey earthquakes within the locale.

== Ecology ==
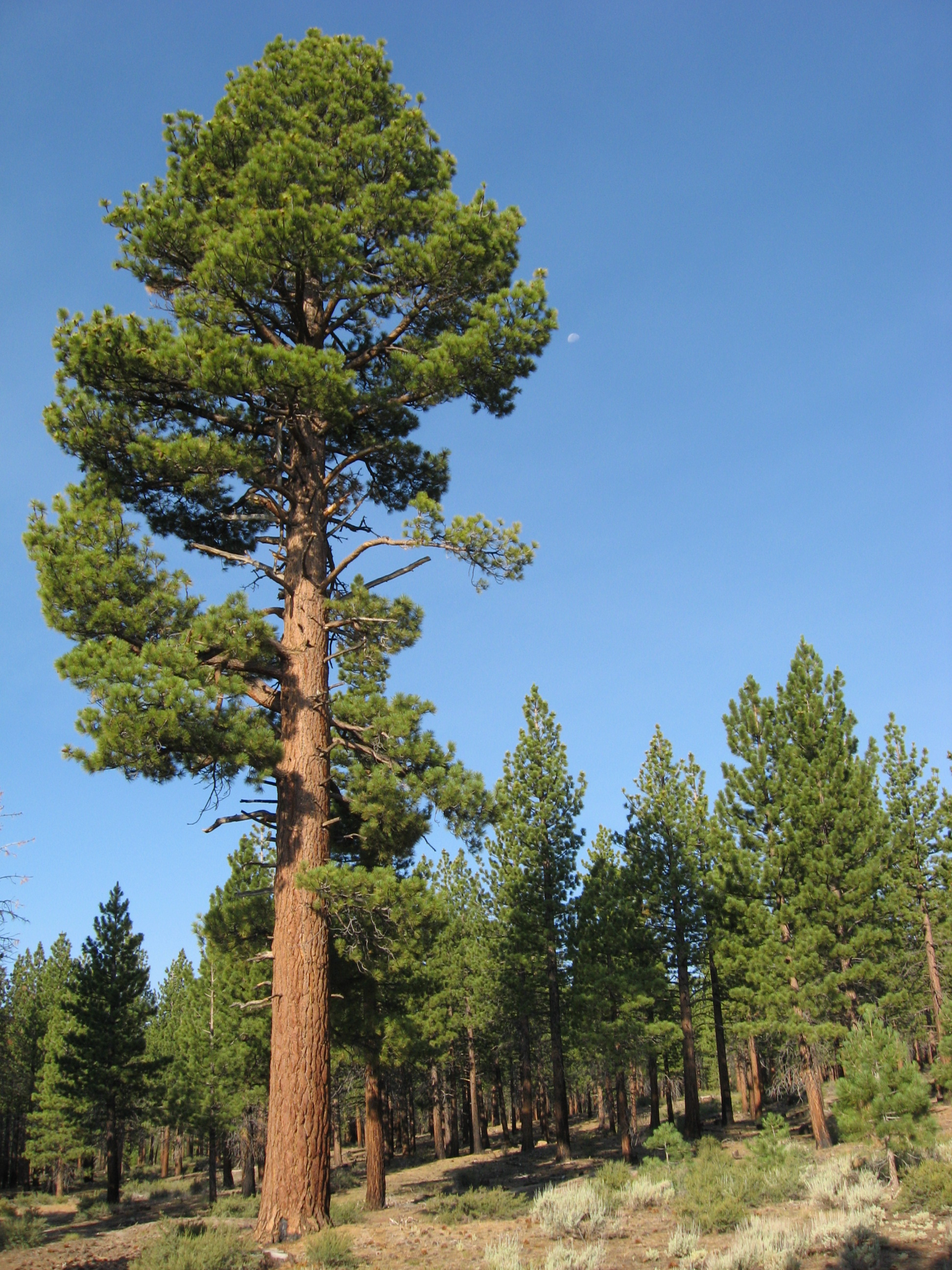
Jeffrey pines (pictured) are common near the Chaos Crags and the surrounding Lassen Volcanic National Park

Like the nearby Devastated Area by Lassen Peak, the Chaos Jumbles have skipped the usual plant regrowth phase dominated by herbaceous plants, moving directly to conifer regrowth. Crags Lake hosts tadpoles and many frogs. The vegetation there is dominated by sugar pines, with sparse white firs and Jeffrey pines. There is also a small chokecherry tree at the eastern edge of the lake.

Throughout Lassen Volcanic National Park, forests can be found featuring red fir, mountain alder, western white pine, white fir, lodgepole pine, Jeffrey pine, ponderosa pine, incense cedar, juniper, and live oak. Other plants found in the area consist of coyote mint, lupines, mule's ears, ferns, corn lilies, red mountain heathers, pinemat manzanitas, greenleaf manzanitas, bush chinquapins, catchflies, Fremont's butterweed, buckwheat, granite gilia, mountain pride, mariposa tulips, creambush, and a variety of chaparral shrubs.

The various habitats in the Lassen Volcanic National Park support about 300 vertebrate species like mammals, reptiles, amphibians, fish, and birds, including bald eagles, which are listed as "Threatened" under the Endangered Species Act of 1973, and peregrine falcons, which were removed from the endangered species list in 1999. In forested areas below 7,800 feet (2,400 m), animals include American black bears, mule deer, martens, brown creepers, mountain chickadees, white-headed woodpeckers, long-toed salamanders, and several bat species. At higher elevations, Clark's nutcrackers, deer mice, and chipmunks can be found among mountain hemlock stands, and subalpine zones with sparse vegetation host populations of gray-crowned rosy finches, pikas, and golden-mantled ground squirrels. Among scattered stands of pinemat manzanita, red fir, and lodgepole pine, animals include dark-eyed juncos, montane voles, and sagebrush lizards. Meadows at the bottoms of valleys along streams and lakes support Pacific tree frogs, Western terrestrial garter snakes, common snipes, and mountain pocket gophers. Other animals found within the national park area include snakes like rubber boas, common garter snakes, and striped whipsnakes; cougars; amphibians like newts, salamanders, rough-skinned newts, and Cascades frogs; 216 species of birds including MacGillivray's warblers, Wilson's warblers, song sparrows, spotted owls, northern goshawks, and bufflehead ducks; five species of native fish that include rainbow trout, tui chubs, speckled daces, Lahontan redsides, and Tahoe suckers; and four invasive fish species including brook trout, brown trout, golden shiners, and fathead minnows. Prominent invertebrate species include California tortoiseshell butterflies.

== Human history ==
The Chaos Crags were known to the Whitney Survey, and were observed by Brewer and King in 1863. The name Chaos Crags was officially recognized by the Board on Geographic Names Decisions in 1927.

Geological study of the Chaos Crags began in the late 1920s, when Howel Williams wrote about its pyroclastic rock deposits, rockfall avalanches, and the dome-producing eruptions. Though Williams initially suggested that volcanic activity and the ensuing landslides took place about 200 years ago, additional study of the rockfalls by James P. Heath placed their age between 1,500 and 300 years ago. This was followed by mapping of the Manzanita Lake and Prospect Peak quadrangles in the 1960s by Gordon A. Macdonald.

In 1974, the National Park Service closed the visitor center and accommodations at Manzanita Lake, fearing that these buildings would be in the way of a rockslide from Chaos Crags if an earthquake or volcanic eruption occurred in the area. In 2011, twenty wooden cabins, along with picnic tables, fire rings, and food lockers, were reinstalled in the Manzanita Lake Campground. It had been determined in the 1980s that the rockslide danger had been overstated by the USGS (after the cabins were torn down), and therefore, the cabins were reintroduced to the park for nightly rental.

== Recreation ==
The Chaos Crags and Crags Lake Trail, which lasts about three hours round-trip, spans 4.2 miles (6.8 km), commencing at Manzanita Camp Road and traveling through a forested area next to the Jumbles. Gaining 850 feet (260 m) in elevation, the trail offers views of the Jumbles, the Crags, and the pyroclastic flow deposits, in addition to the Hat Creek valley and the Thousand Lakes Wilderness. Crags Lake can be reached after about 1.7 miles (2.7 km) of the trail and can be used for swimming. Despite its accessibility, the area receives relatively few visitors, and swimming conditions are usually poor given the small size of the lake. An additional 1.6-mile (2.6 km) trail runs around Manzanita Lake.

== Notes ==
- [a] Other sources disagree on the elevation, listing it as 8,504 feet (2,592 m).

== Sources ==
- Brown, A. M (2011). The Creaky Knees Guide Northern California: The 80 Best Easy Hikes. Sasquatch Books. ISBN 978-1-57061-783-6.
- Christiansen, R. L.; Clynne, M. A.; Muffler, L. J. P. (2002). Geologic Map of the Lassen Peak, Chaos Crags, and Upper Hat Creek Area, California: Geologic Investigations Series I-2723 (Map). Denver, Colorado: United States Geological Survey.
- Clynne, M. A.; Muffler, L. J. P. (2010). Geologic Map of Lassen Volcanic National Park and Vicinity, California. United States Geological Survey.
- Clynne, M. A.; Christiansen, R. L.; Trimble, D. A.; McGeehin, J. P. (2002). Radiocarbon Dates from Volcanic Deposits of the Chaos Crags and Cinder Cone Eruptive Sequences and Other Deposits, Lassen Volcanic National Park and Vicinity, California: Open-File Report 02-290. United States Geological Survey.
- Crandell, D. R.; Mullineaux, D. R.; Sigafoos, R. S.; Rubin, M. (1974). "Chaos Crags Eruptions and Rockfall-Avalanches, Lassen Volcanic National Park, California". Journal of Research of the United States Geological Survey. 2 (1). Denver, Colorado: United States Geological Survey: 49–59.
- Harris, A. G.; Tuttle, E.; Tuttle, S. D. (2004). Geology of National Parks. Kendall Hunt.
- Harris, S. L. (2005). Fire Mountains of the West: The Cascade and Mono Lake Volcanoes (Third ed.). Missoula, Montana: Mountain Press Publishing Company. pp. 73–98. ISBN 0-87842-511-X.
- Heid, M. (2015). 101 Hikes in Northern California: Exploring Mountains, Valley, and Seashore. Wilderness Press. ISBN 978-0-89997-782-9.
- Heiken, G.; Eichelberger, J. C. (May 1980). "Eruptions at Chaos Crags, Lassen Volcanic National Park, California". Journal of Volcanology and Geothermal Research. 7 (3–4). Elsevier: 443–481. Bibcode:1980JVGR....7..443H. doi:10.1016/0377-0273(80)90042-6.
- Heiken, G.; Wohletz, K. (1987). "Tephra Deposits Associated with Silicic Domes and Lava Flows". In Fink, J. H. (ed.). The Emplacement of Silicic Domes and Lava Flows, Issue 212 (PDF). pp. 55–76.
- Klemetti, E. W.; Clynne, M. A. (December 2014). "Localized Rejuvenation of a Crystal Mush Recorded in Zircon Temporal and Compositional Variation at the Lassen VolcanicCenter, Northern California". PLOS One. 9 (12) e113157. Public Library of Science. Bibcode:2014PLoSO...9k3157K. doi:10.1371/journal.pone.0113157. PMC 4254462. PMID 25470726.
- Lopes, R. M. C. (2005). The Volcano Adventure Guide. Cambridge University Press. ISBN 978-0-521-55453-4.
- Soares, J. R. (1996). 75 Hikes in California's Lassen Park & Mount Shasta Regions. The Mountaineers Books. ISBN 978-0-89886-466-3.
- Soares, J.; Soares, M. (2008). 100 Classic Hikes in Northern California: Sierra Nevada / Cascade Mountains / Klamath Mountains / Coast Range & North Coast / San Francisco Bay Area. The Mountaineers Books. ISBN 978-1-59485-248-0.
- Tepley III, F. J.; Davidson, J. P.; Clynne, M. A. (1999). "Magmatic Interactions as Recorded in Plagioclase Phenocrysts of Chaos Crags, Lassen Volcanic Center, California". Journal of Petrology. 40 (5). Oxford Journals: 787–806. doi:10.1093/petrology/40.5.787.
- White, M. (2016). Lassen Volcanic National Park: Your Complete Hiking Guide. Wilderness Press. ISBN 978-0-89997-799-7.
- Williams, H. (1932). Geology of the Lassen Volcanic National Park, California. University of California Press.
