= Benjamin Franklin Loomis =

American photographer (1857–1935)

B. F. Loomis
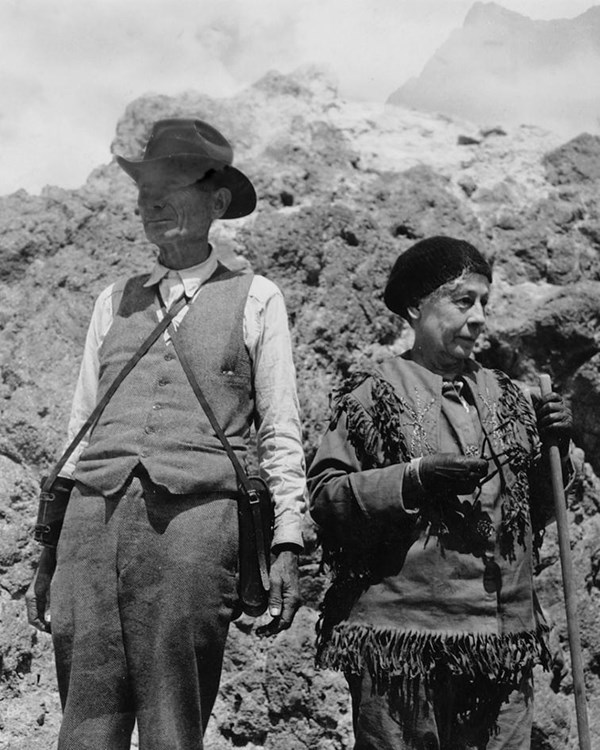
- Benjamin and Estella Loomis on Lassen Peak summit
- Born: March 21, 1857; Illinois, United States
- Died: June 11, 1935 (aged 78); California, United States
- Other name: Frank Loomis
- Known for: Photographs of the 1914–1915 eruptions of Lassen Peak
- Notable work: Pictorial History of the Lassen Volcano (1926)

Benjamin Franklin Loomis (March 21, 1857–June 11, 1935) was an American photographer. His photos of the 1914–1915 eruptions of Lassen Peak brought national attention to the area and supported the campaign to establish Lassen Volcanic National Park.

== Life at Lassen ==
Loomis was born on March 21, 1857, in Illinois. He arrived in northern California with his family by way of the Nobles Emigrant Trail when he was a young child. When he was 18, he moved to the Manzanita Lake area where he built a cabin on the creek above the lake and became a shake cutter. He also worked as a farm hand, and invested his money into timber claims. In 1886, he travelled to New York City to attend the American Institute of Phrenology. He returned to California and married his wife Estella at age 40. They welcomed their daughter Louisa Mae two years later.

=== Lassen photography ===
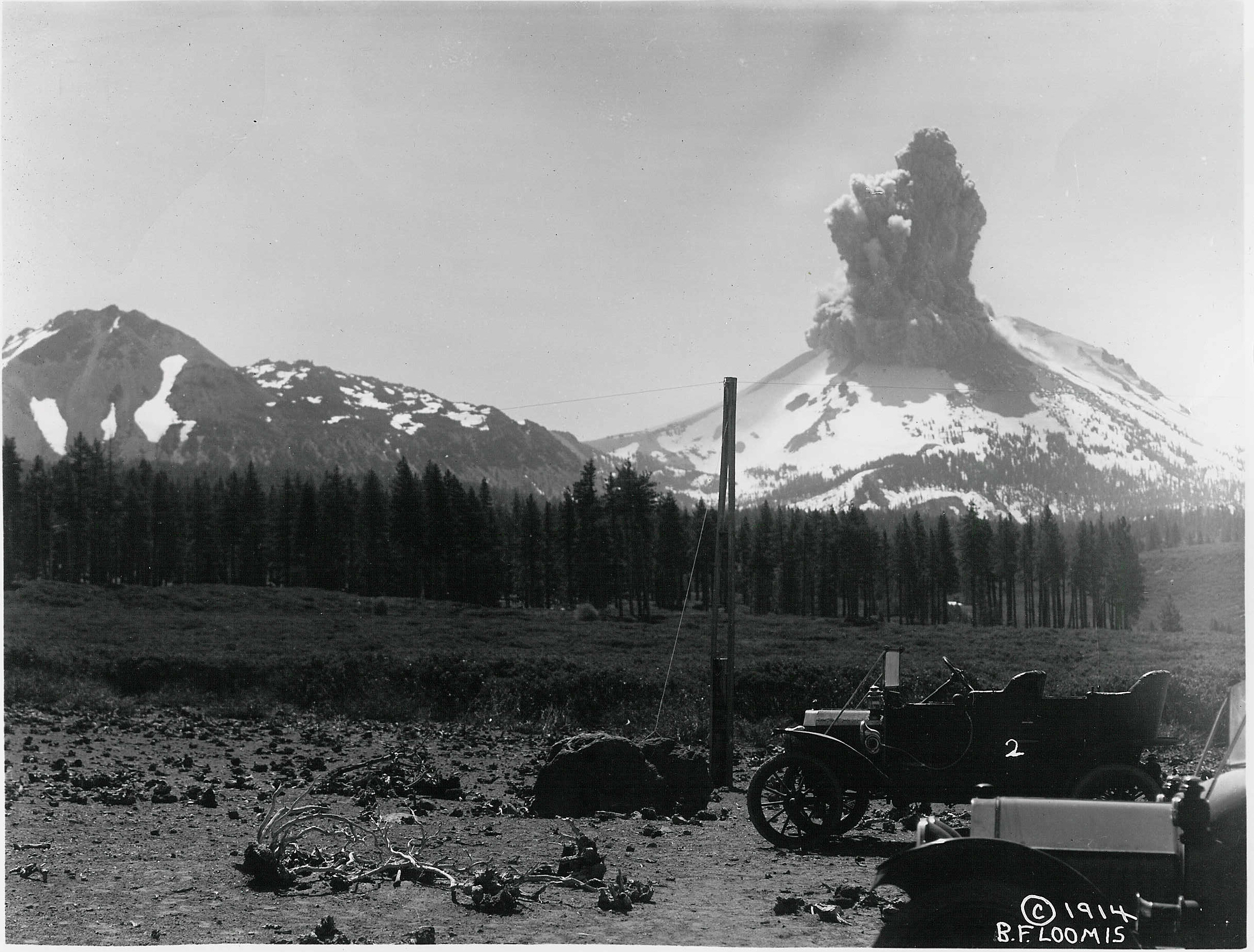
Photograph of the eruption of Lassen Peak on June 14, 1914, taken by B.F. Loomis

On May 30, 1914, Loomis received word that Lassen Peak was erupting. In June, he shot a series of six exposures that brought Lassen Peak into the national spotlight and supported the campaign to establish Lassen Volcanic National Park. He called the event, "the dramatic awakening of a restless giant".

He continued to make trips to the mountain whenever he could throughout the next year to record the events and to guide visiting geologists and dignitaries to the volcano.

== Development of Manzanita Lake ==
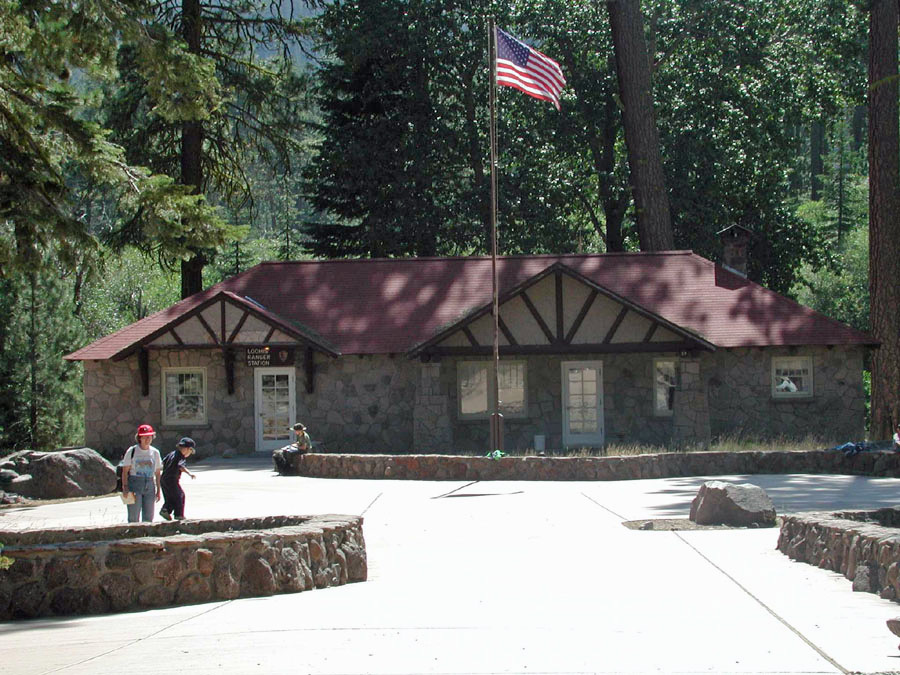
Loomis Art House served as the Loomis' residence, photography studio and shop until the 1950s under the name "B.F. Loomis Photo and Art Store"

Despite a busy life as a merchant who operated a store, hotel, freighting business and lumber mill in nearby Viola, California; Loomis always had time and energy to promote interest in the park. In 1926 the Loomises purchased 40 acres of land in the Manzanita Lake area. The following year they completed construction of the Louisa Mae Loomis Memorial Museum in memory of their daughter who died in 1921. The museum displayed Loomis’ pictorial record of the 1914-15 eruptions of Lassen Peak, which were also included in Loomis' book Pictorial History of the Lassen Volcano that was published in 1926.

In 1929, the Loomises donated their 40 acres, the museum, and an adjacent seismograph building to the park. That same year they began construction of a combination residence and art store across from the museum on a five-acre lifetime lease. The couple lived and sold photographs, postcards, and film from the residence/art store. Frank and Estella greeted visitors at their art studio or the museum and sometimes gave lectures based on Frank's photograph collection.

Frank and Estella lived at Manzanita Lake in the summer and wintered at their home in Anderson. Early in 1935, at the age of 78 years, Frank developed cancer of the stomach and died on June 11 of that year. Estella donated the Loomis Residence & Art Store to the park upon her death in 1953.

== Legacy ==
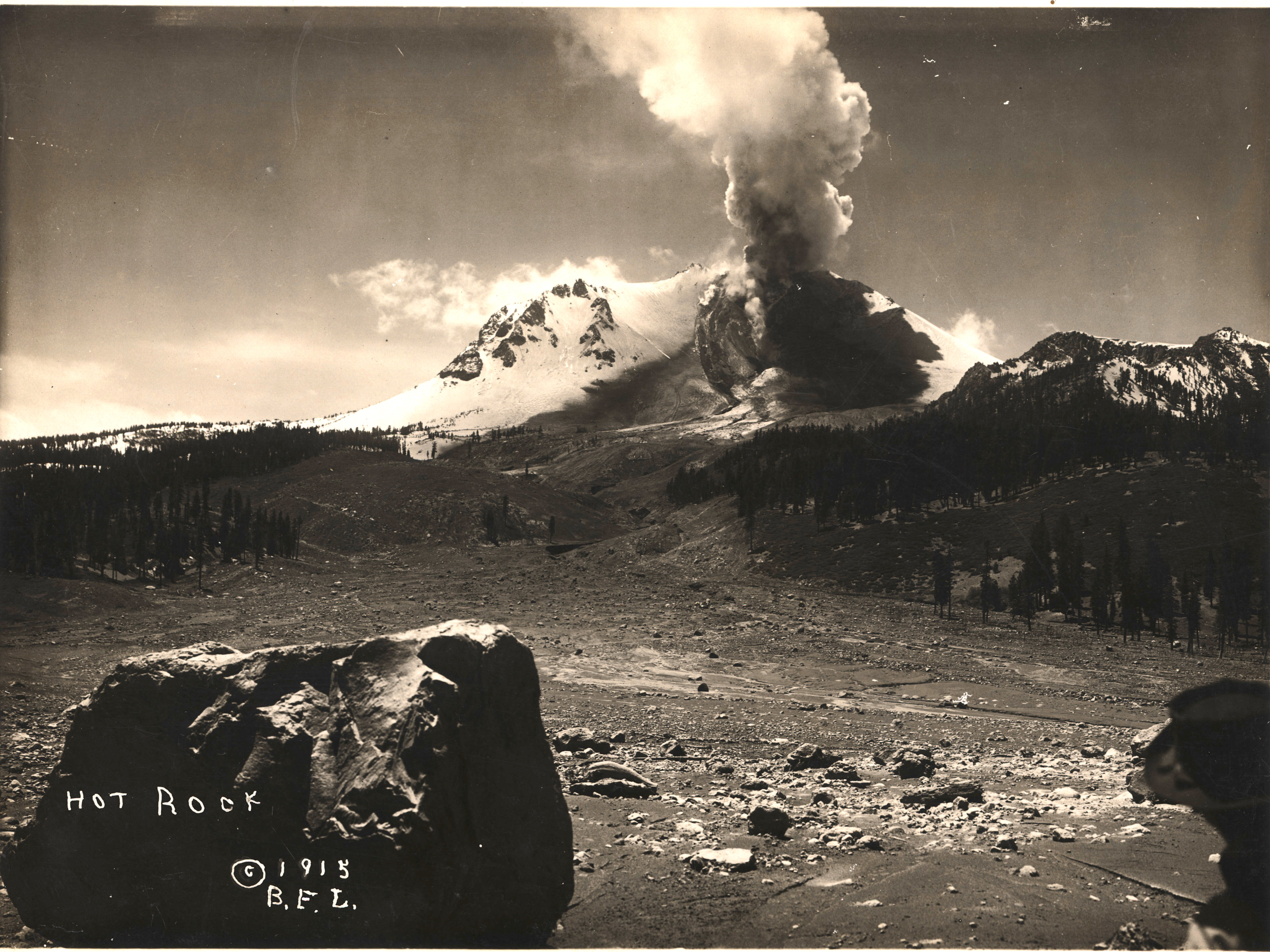
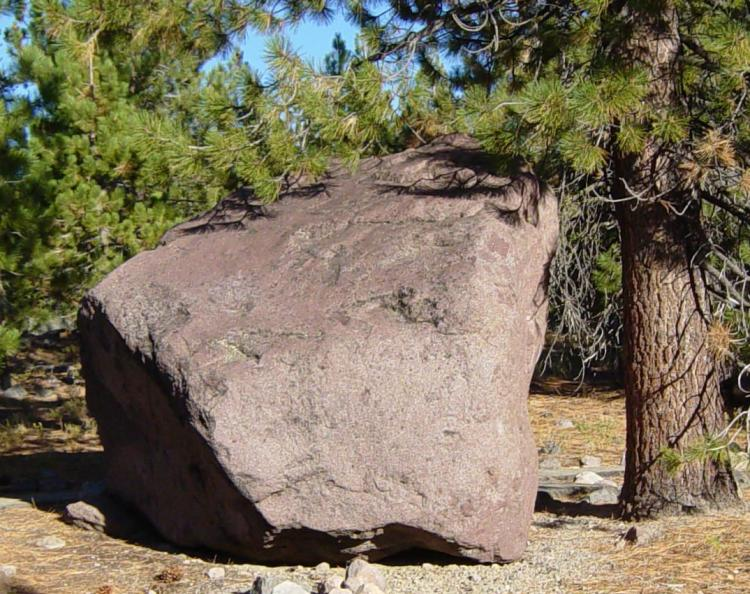
The "Loomis Hot Rock" photographed in 1915 by Loomis (left) and 2003 (right)

Loomis' name remains in the Loomis Museum, which serves as a visitor center for Lassen Volcanic National Park. The "Loomis Hot Rock", a black dacite boulder made famous by a photograph Loomis took in 1915, is a landmark in the Devastated Area of Lassen. Several of the buildings constructed by the Loomis family are now part of the Manzanita Lake Naturalist's Services Historic District and are under federal protection.

The B.F. Loomis Photograph Collection contains images of the Lassen Peak eruptions and aftermath, natural and man made features in the region, Loomis’ lumbering business, and the Loomis family. The collection contains most of the photographs that appear in Loomis’ book, Pictorial History of the Lassen Volcano. The B.F. Loomis Photograph Collection was donated to the park by B.F. and Estella Loomis in multiple gifts over the years.
