= Manzanita Lake =

Lake in the state of California, United States

- Lago Manzanita (Spanish)
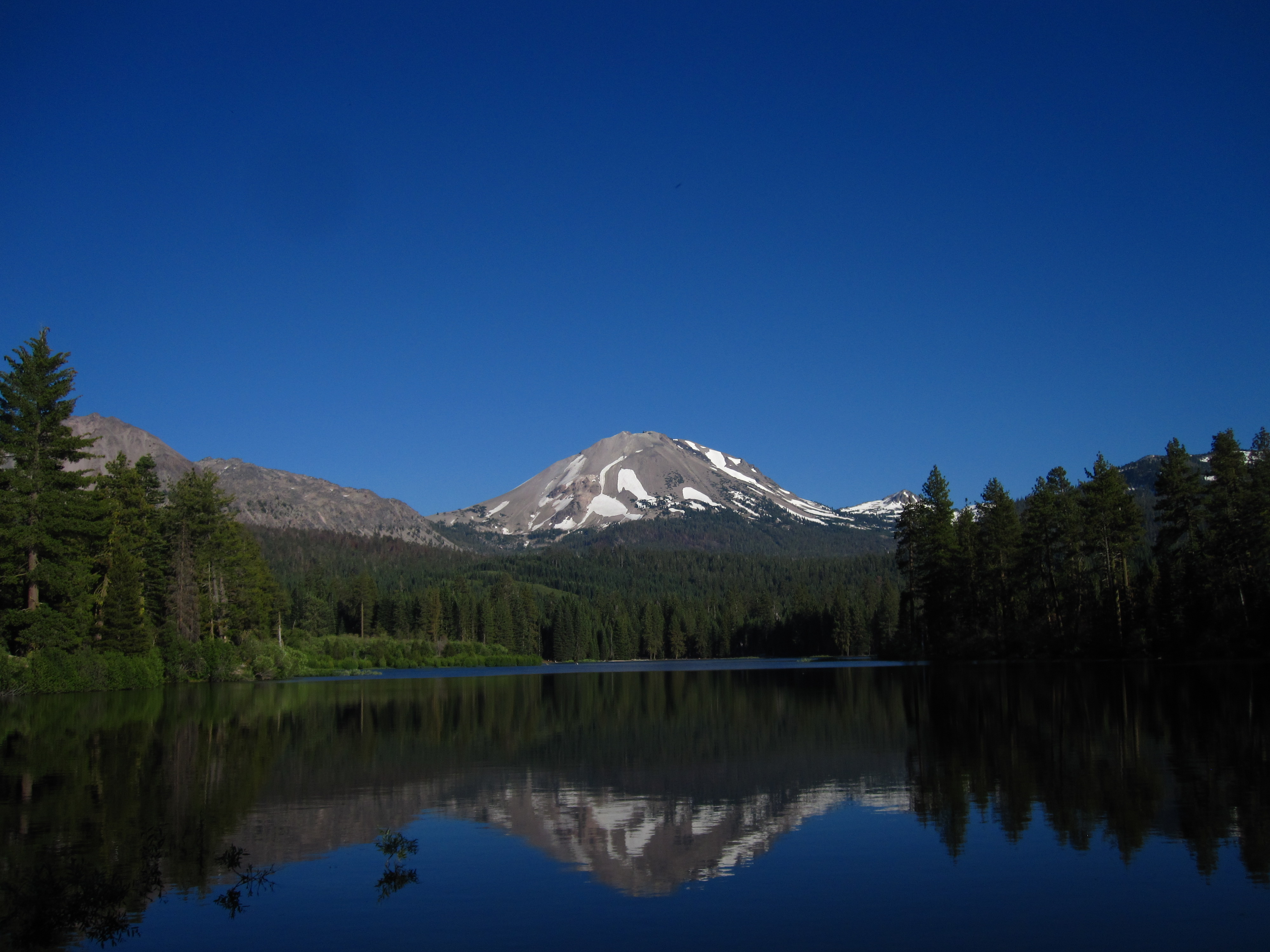
- Lassen Peak reflected in Manzanita Lake

- Location within California Location within the United States
- Location: Lassen Volcanic National Park, Shasta County, California, US
- Coordinates: 40°32′01″N 121°34′04″W
- Basin countries: United States

Manzanita Lake is a lake located in Lassen Volcanic National Park. The name means "little apple" in Spanish.

Manzanita Lake was formed when Manzanita Creek was dammed 300 years ago by a rock avalanche from the northwest slope of the Chaos Crags, which also resulted in the debris formation known as Chaos Jumbles.

The area around the lake features the Loomis Museum, a campground, and the Manzanita Lake Naturalist's Services Historic District. Located near the park entrance, the lake is open for fishing and has rainbow, brown and brook trout.

== Climate ==
Manzanita Lake has a warm-summer humid continental climate (Dsb) using the 0 °C isotherm or a warm-summer mediterranean climate (Csb) using the -3 °C isotherm with short, warm summers and cool winters, with most precipitation falling in the winter months.

Climate data for Manzanita Lake, California, 1991–2020 normals, extremes 1949–present
Month	Jan	Feb	Mar	Apr	May	Jun	Jul	Aug	Sep	Oct	Nov	Dec	Year
Record high °F (°C)	67 (19)	68 (20)	71 (22)	78 (26)	88 (31)	94 (34)	97 (36)	96 (36)	96 (36)	88 (31)	78 (26)	68 (20)	97 (36)
Mean maximum °F (°C)	55.2 (12.9)	56.2 (13.4)	61.5 (16.4)	69.0 (20.6)	77.8 (25.4)	85.6 (29.8)	89.8 (32.1)	89.0 (31.7)	85.7 (29.8)	76.6 (24.8)	63.5 (17.5)	54.4 (12.4)	91.5 (33.1)
Mean daily maximum °F (°C)	41.1 (5.1)	41.8 (5.4)	46.0 (7.8)	50.2 (10.1)	60.7 (15.9)	69.5 (20.8)	78.8 (26.0)	78.3 (25.7)	72.4 (22.4)	58.7 (14.8)	47.1 (8.4)	39.5 (4.2)	57.0 (13.9)
Daily mean °F (°C)	31.5 (−0.3)	31.8 (−0.1)	35.1 (1.7)	38.8 (3.8)	47.9 (8.8)	55.3 (12.9)	62.6 (17.0)	61.6 (16.4)	56.5 (13.6)	46.0 (7.8)	36.6 (2.6)	30.6 (−0.8)	44.5 (7.0)
Mean daily minimum °F (°C)	21.8 (−5.7)	21.7 (−5.7)	24.3 (−4.3)	27.5 (−2.5)	35.1 (1.7)	41.0 (5.0)	46.4 (8.0)	44.9 (7.2)	40.6 (4.8)	33.4 (0.8)	26.2 (−3.2)	21.7 (−5.7)	32.1 (0.0)
Mean minimum °F (°C)	5.8 (−14.6)	8.1 (−13.3)	9.4 (−12.6)	15.3 (−9.3)	22.8 (−5.1)	29.5 (−1.4)	36.8 (2.7)	36.4 (2.4)	30.1 (−1.1)	23.8 (−4.6)	13.3 (−10.4)	7.1 (−13.8)	2.4 (−16.4)
Record low °F (°C)	−13 (−25)	−11 (−24)	−7 (−22)	−2 (−19)	11 (−12)	19 (−7)	26 (−3)	28 (−2)	19 (−7)	10 (−12)	2 (−17)	−13 (−25)	−13 (−25)
Average precipitation inches (mm)	6.50 (165)	5.51 (140)	6.43 (163)	4.30 (109)	2.90 (74)	1.32 (34)	0.34 (8.6)	0.29 (7.4)	0.65 (17)	2.70 (69)	4.68 (119)	6.49 (165)	42.11 (1,071)
Average snowfall inches (cm)	33.1 (84)	34.9 (89)	33.9 (86)	20.8 (53)	6.3 (16)	0.8 (2.0)	trace	0.0 (0.0)	0.1 (0.25)	3.9 (9.9)	11.8 (30)	31.7 (81)	177.3 (451.15)
Average extreme snow depth inches (cm)	31.3 (80)	37.4 (95)	38.8 (99)	21.3 (54)	4.6 (12)	0.7 (1.8)	0.0 (0.0)	0.0 (0.0)	0.1 (0.25)	2.6 (6.6)	8.6 (22)	21.8 (55)	46.3 (118)
Average precipitation days (≥ 0.01 in)	12.9	11.5	12.1	10.2	7.8	4.4	1.3	1.5	3.0	5.9	11.0	12.7	94.3
Average snowy days (≥ 0.1 in)	9.4	9.2	8.6	6.1	1.9	0.4	0.0	0.0	0.1	1.1	5.4	8.9	51.1
Source 1: NOAA (snow, snow days, precip days 1981–2010)
Source 2: National Weather Service

== Gallery ==
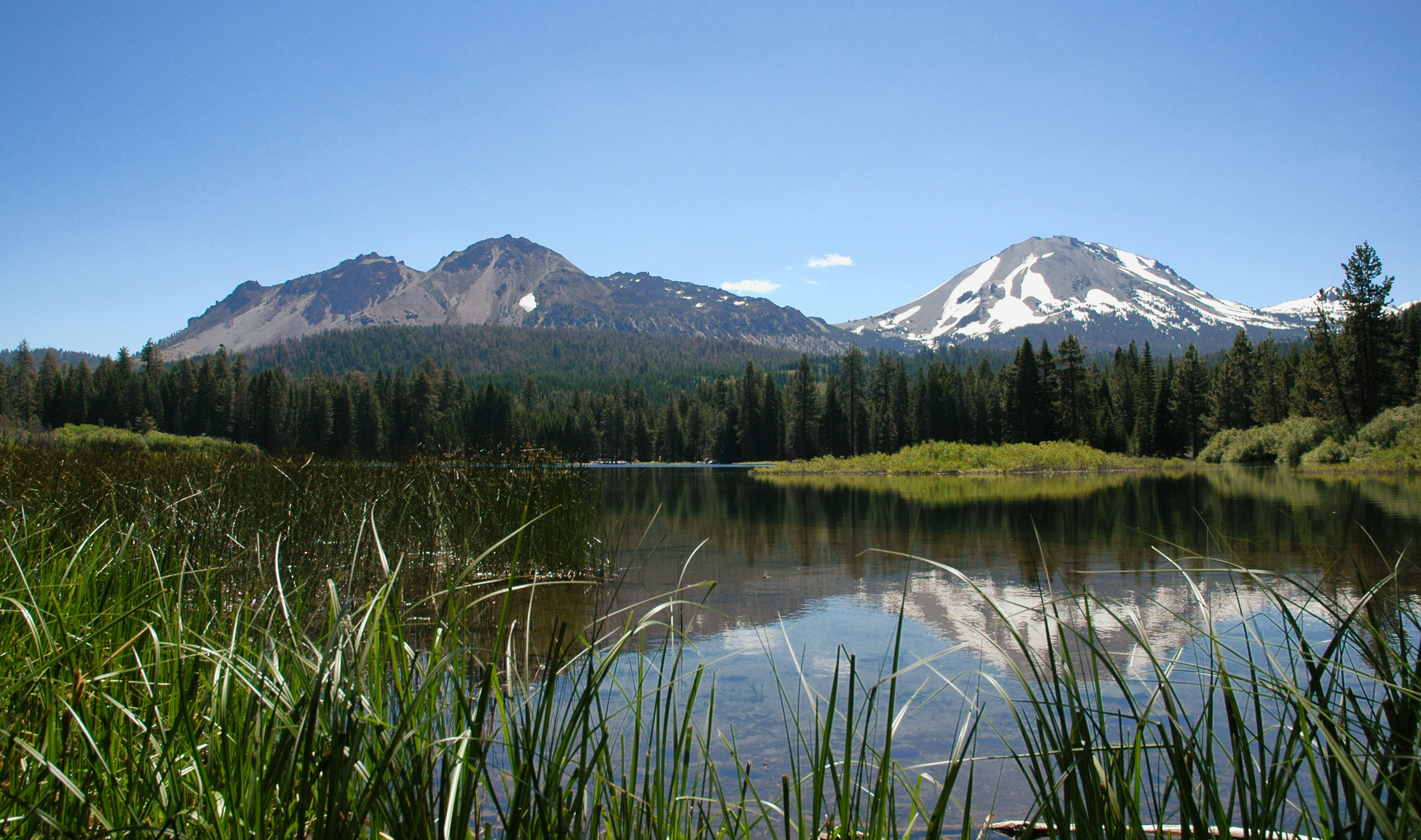
View of Chaos Crags and Lassen Peak from the lakeshore.

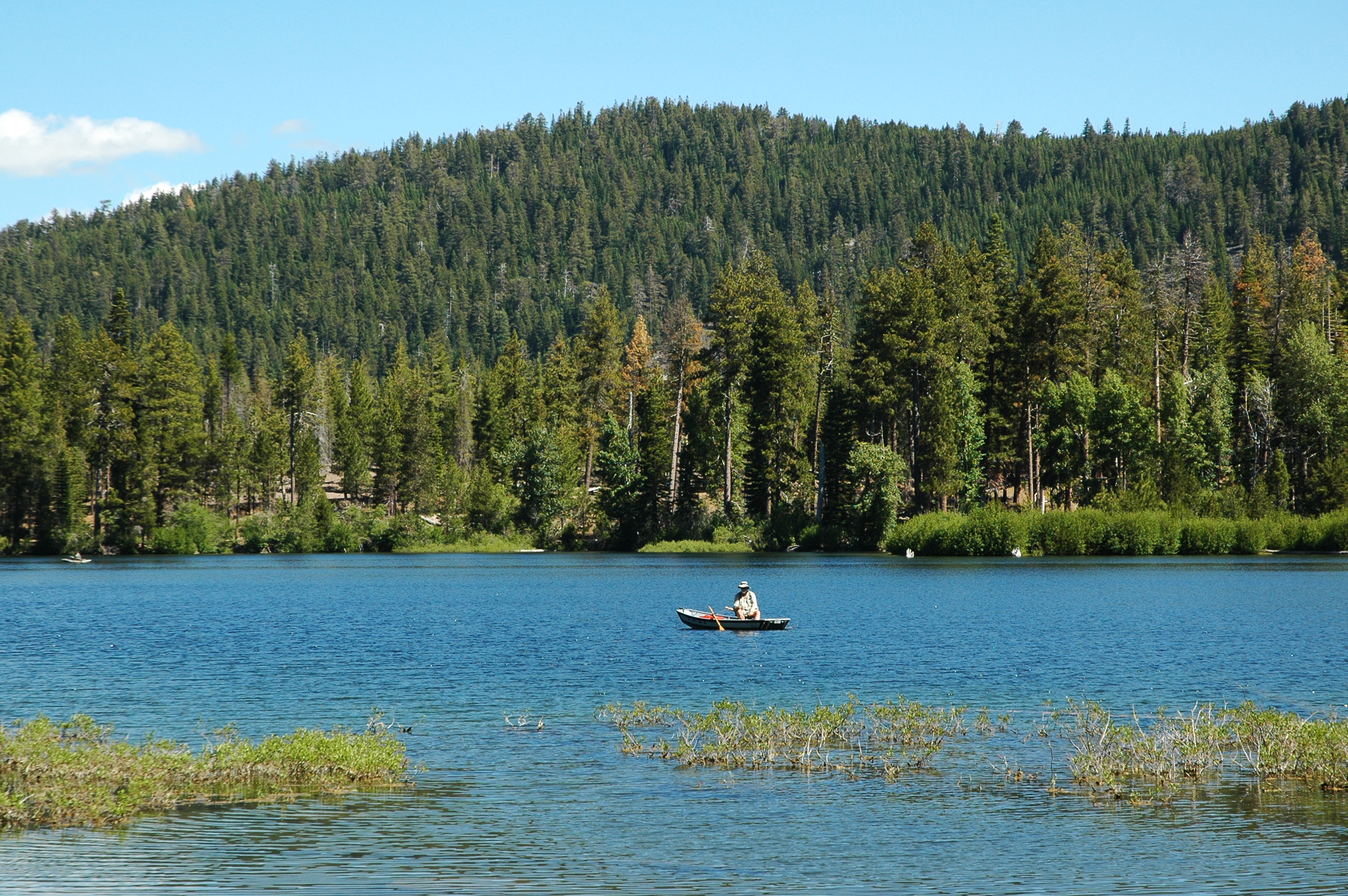
Fishing on Manzanita Lake.

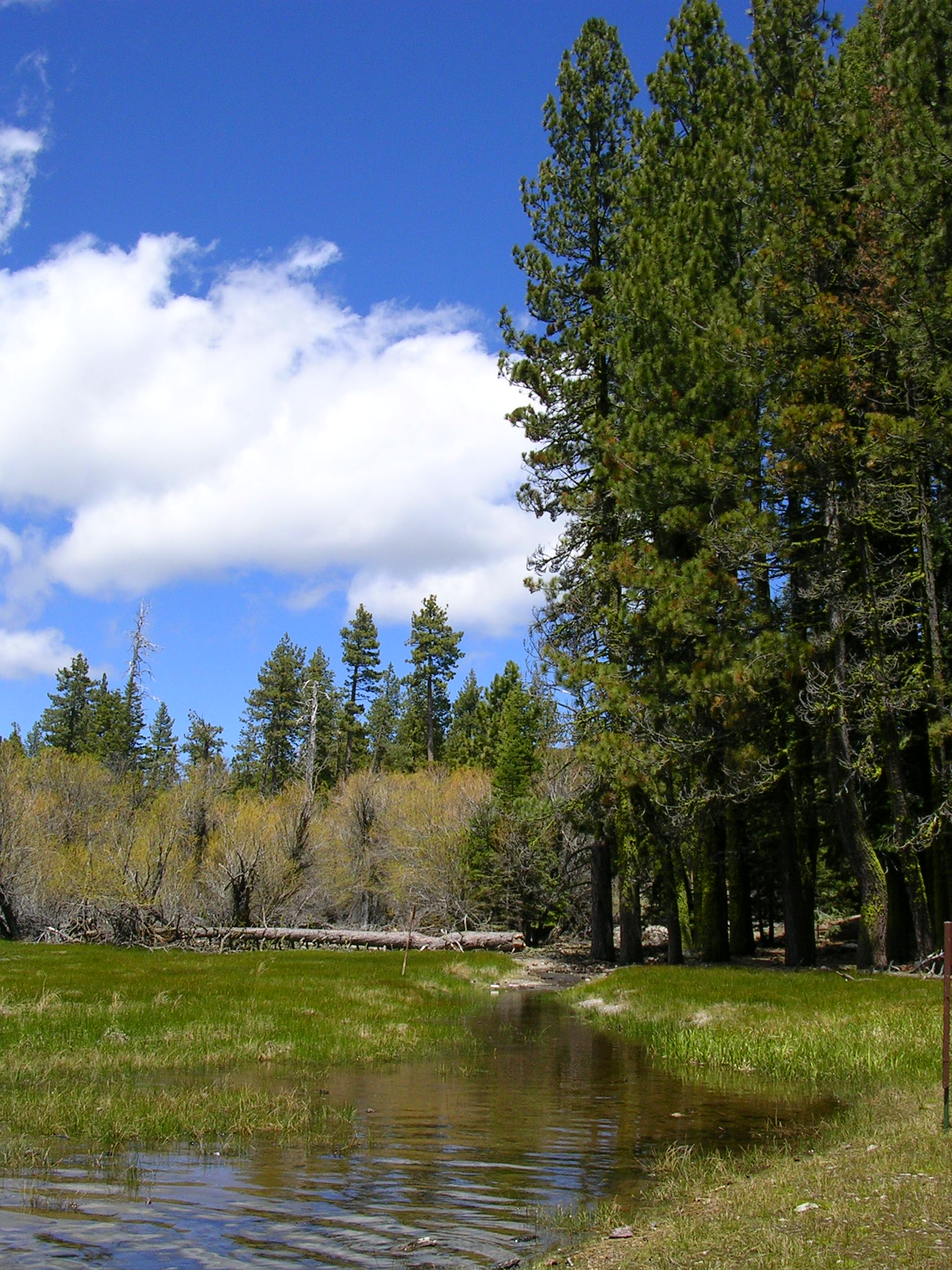
The shore of Manzanita Lake.

== See also ==
- List of lakes in California
