= Manzanita Lake Naturalist's Services Historic District =

Historic district in California, United States

- U.S. National Register of Historic Places
- U.S. Historic district
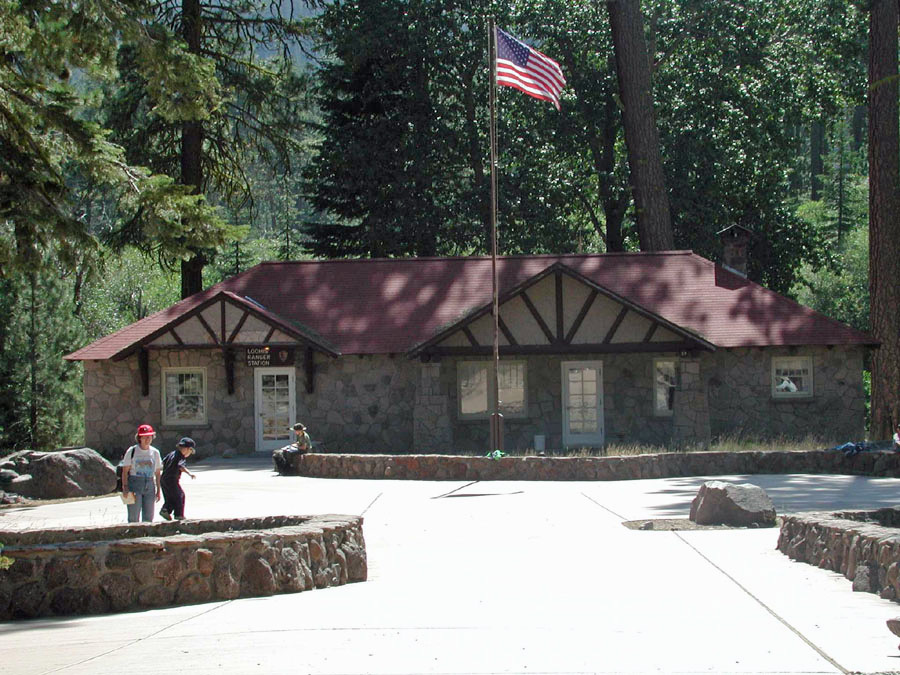
- Loomis Art House

- Location within California Location within the United States
- Location: 39489 CA 44, Shingletown, California
- Coordinates: 40°32′10″N 121°33′44″W
- Area: 85 acres (34 ha)
- Built: 1927
- Built by: Benjamin and Estella Loomis, Civilian Conservation Corps
- Architect: National Park Service (1930s structures)
- Architectural style: Renaissance, NPS Rustic
- MPS: Lassen Volcanic National Park MPS
- NRHP reference No.: 06000525
- Added to NRHP: June 23, 2006

The Manzanita Lake Naturalist's Services Historic District encompasses the historic area devoted to visitor interpretation services at the northwest entrance of Lassen Volcanic National Park in northeastern California. The district's earliest structures were built by Benjamin and Estella Loomis, who were instrumental in the establishment of the park and among the park's first concessioners. The 1927 Loomis Museum and its seismograph hut were built by the Loomises and were donated, together with 40 acres (16 ha) of land to the National Park Service in 1929. The Loomis House, also known as the Loomis Art House and Manzanita Lake Ranger Station, was built about the same time as the museum and served as their residence, photography studio and shop until the 1950s under the name "B.F. Loomis Photo and Art Store".

Park Service structures were developed at Manzanita Lake in the 1930s. Park Service-designed and constructed buildings include the entrance station (1930), the ranger residence (1931) and the comfort station (1931). The naturalist's residence (1933) shares a similar design to its counterparts at Crater Lake National Park, with their design and construction techniques adapted to the short building seasons prevalent at both parks. The residence was built using Civilian Conservation Corps labor.

The area was abandoned in 1973 after a geological report indicated that a rockfall in the Chaos Crags could reach the Manzanita Lake area in 90 seconds. The Manzanita Lodge and cabins were therefore closed and demolished. In 1987 a reassessment indicated that such a rockfall could not reach Manzanita Lake and the area was reoccupied and renovated. The lodge was never rebuilt. The Manzanita Lake Naturalist's Services Historic District was placed on the National Register of Historic Places on June 23, 2006.

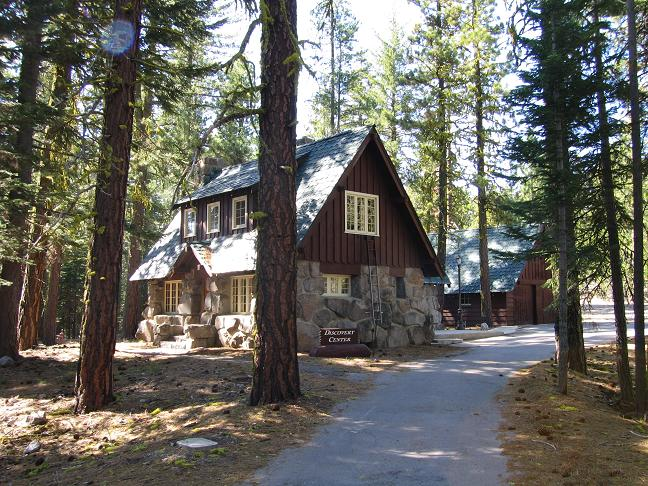
Naturalist's residence, now the Discovery Center

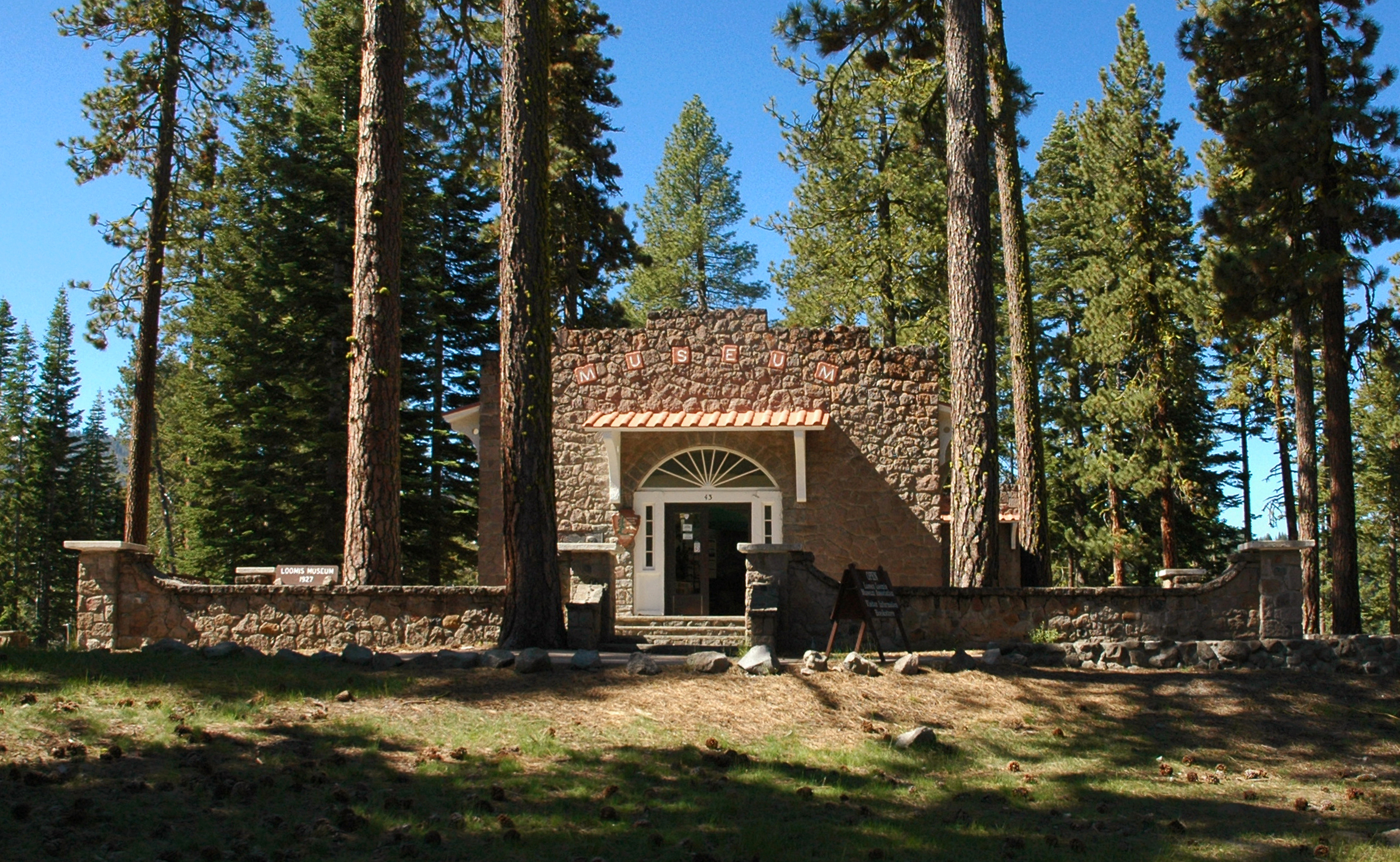
Loomis Museum
