= Caribou Wilderness =

Protected wilderness area in California, United States

- IUCN category Ib (wilderness area)
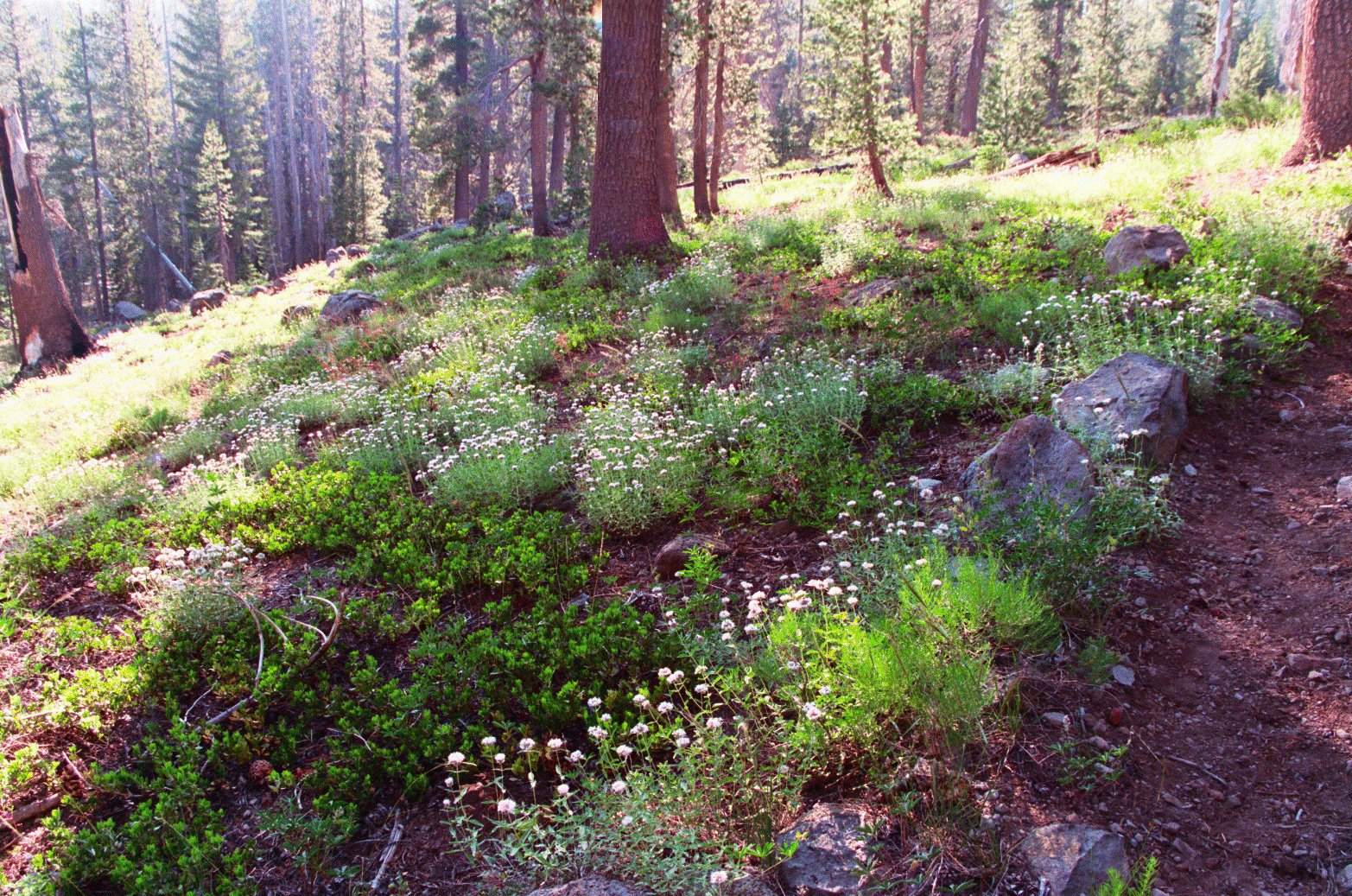
- Caribou rock garden

- Location within California Location within the United States
- Interactive map of Caribou Wilderness
- Location: Cascade Range, east of Lassen Peak, Lassen County / Plumas County, California
- Nearest city: Susanville, California
- Coordinates: 40°30′03″N 121°12′05″W
- Area: 20,546 acres (83.15 km^{2})
- Established: 1964
- Governing body: U.S. Forest Service / US Department of Agriculture

The Caribou Wilderness is a federally designated wilderness area created by the Wilderness Act of 1964 and is part of the National Wilderness Preservation System. It is located 60 miles (97 km) east of Redding in the state of California, United States. The Caribou Wilderness comprises 20,546 acres (83.15 km^{2}) and is adjacent to the east side of Lassen Volcanic National Park. Although the park (which includes its own Lassen Volcanic Wilderness area) is surrounded by Lassen National Forest, it is managed separately by the National Park Service, whereas the U.S. Forest Service manages the wilderness.

Elevations range from 6,400 feet (2,000 m) to 8,374 feet (2,552 m).

The terrain is a volcanic plateau with 75% covered by water and conifer forests and the remainder being barren rock such as cliff faces, talus slopes and cinder cones. Most of this area has been preserved since 1932 which makes the Caribou Wilderness one of the few remaining pristine forests of the California Cascade region. There are 23 named lakes, innumerable unnamed ponds and tarns, cinder cones and volcanic buttes within the wilderness. Although there are no year round surface streams, the area provides high quality water for the headwaters of the Susan River, and Bailey Creek, a tributary of the Feather River. The high point is Red Cinder (8,363 ft) located near the boundary between the wilderness and the park. Other peaks are North Caribou (7,785 ft), South Caribou ( 7,753 ft) and Black Butte in the northeast at 7,989 ft.

Recreational activities include day hiking, backpacking, fishing, horseback riding, cross-country skiing, nature photography and rock climbing. The Forest Service encourages the practice of Leave No Trace principles of outdoor travel to minimize human impact on the environment.

== Flora, fauna and fungi ==
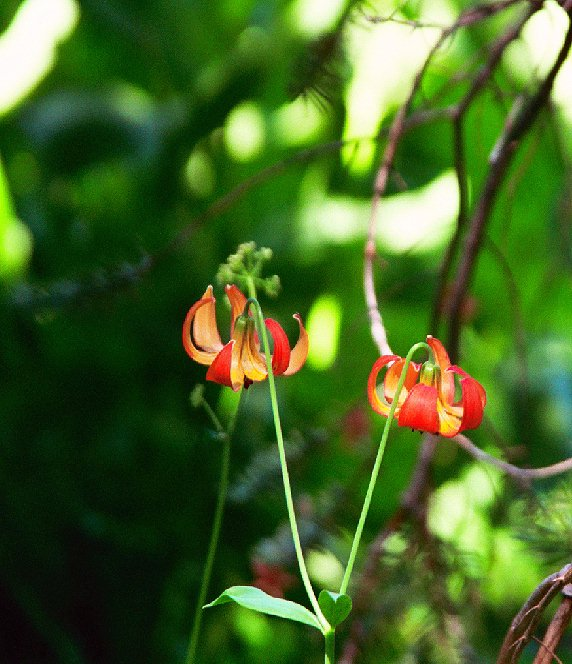
A Shasta tiger lily ( Lilium pardalinum ssp. shastense)

The forest is lodgepole pine, Jeffrey pine, ponderosa pine, Douglas fir, white and red fir, western white pine, incense cedar, and hemlock.

21 of Caribou's lakes are stocked by air with rainbow trout. Black-tailed deer and black bears along with squirrels, chipmunks, and the protected (from hunting) pine marten live here. There are bald eagles and ospreys overhead, mergansers and grebes on the ponds and lakes.

Much smaller in size, but critically important to the forest ecosystem are the fungi. The cup fungus, for instance, can be found in the Caribou. As the sanitary agents of the forest that consume dead organic matter, fungi spread on the floor of a conifer area. Fungal spores blow in on the winds and take up residence at the foot of trees. One type, called the king bolete, is the edible mushroom most sought. Not all fungi have a symbiotic relationship with the trees, some fungi are parasitic, causing heartwood rot. Along some trails in the Caribou, hikers will see a timber-destroying (causes brown rot) pore fungi called the red-belt fomes. It is a white and yellow fungi on the bark of both white fir and red fir trees. An interesting aspect of red-belt fomes is that it has a laquared feel if touched.

== Area history ==
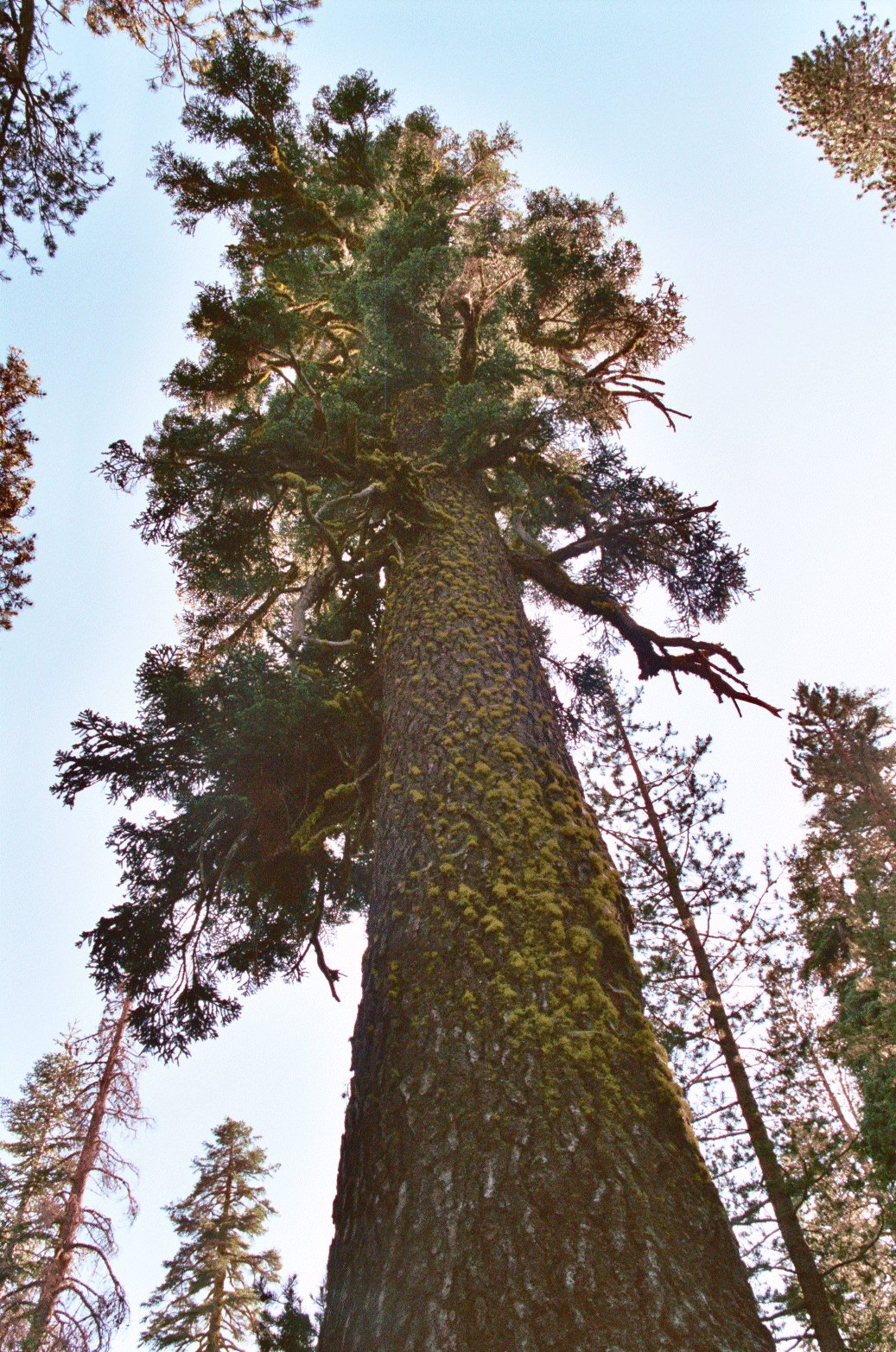
Old growth red fir.

Before this area became a federally protected wilderness in 1964, it had been previously protected as a primitive area since 1932. When the National Park Service was created in 1916, most of the first National Parks were carved out of National Forest Lands.

Beginning in 1929, The United States Forest Service set some areas aside as primitive areas to keep the Park Service from continuing to acquire forest lands. At least that is the conclusion of economist David Gerard, who wrote about the competing interests between the two federal agencies: The Park Service under the federal Department of the Interior and the Forest Service, managed by the federal Department of Agriculture.

The forest service already managed 151 million acres (610,000 km^{2}) of forest reserves before the National Park Service was even in existence. And each new national park had to be approved by the U.S. Congress.

Stephen T. Mather, Director of the National Park Service had made his ideas of park expansion at the expense of the national forest system increasingly apparent to the Forest Service. He had generated such support for the park system that there was at least a fair chance of many large areas in the forests being transferred to the Park Service.

— (Gilligan 1953, 92)

These political maneuverings by the US Forest Service in the years 1929 - 1964 helped in the development of the wilderness preservation system of today.

== Recreation ==
Wilderness areas are managed to preserve the natural, undeveloped conditions as much as possible so there are limitations in the use for recreation. No motorized equipment, vehicles or bicycles can be brought into a wilderness. There are no man-made structures or conveniences, although occasionally evidence of prior land use before the wilderness designation, such as old fences and tree blazes are found. The Caribou is one of the areas protected by the first major legislation for setting aside lands from development and resource extraction. The 1964 Wilderness Act created the Caribou Wilderness out of what was a primitive area since 1932. As a result, an almost pristine, old-growth forest describes the Caribou.

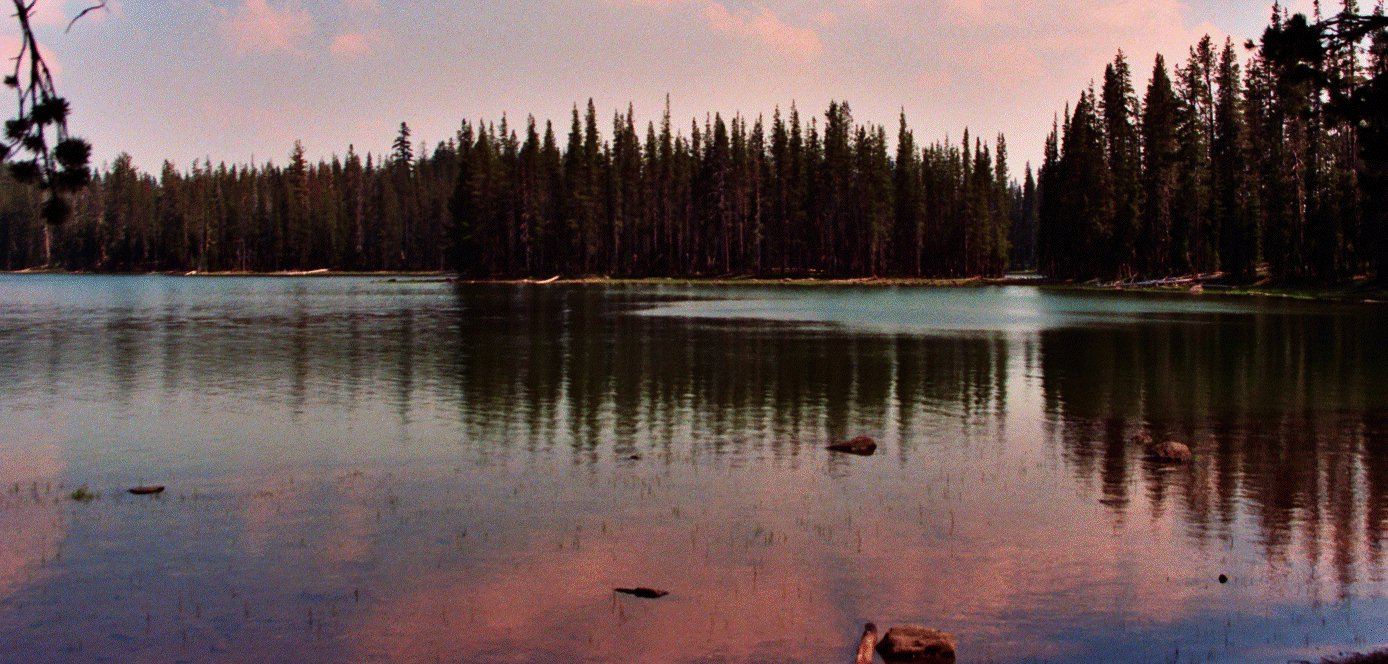
Long Lake

Three trailheads give access to the wilderness; Hay Meadows in the south, Cone Lake in the north and Silver Lake on the east which is also the most popular entry point; as well, the wilderness can be accessed by trails leading in from Lassen Volcanic National Park to the west. Travel by foot or horseback is easy because the landscape has only moderate hills and valleys. No wilderness permits are required, only a California campfire permit for open fires. There are many other trails connecting to other lakes such as Evelyn Lakes as well as trails to the national park's backcountry wilderness area on the west. Backpacking and day hikes are possible with a variety of one-way or loop trips of any length. There are lakes within two miles (3 km) of any trailhead as well as volcanic cinder cones and rocky cliffs for the more adventurous visitors. Off-trail travel is possible but challenging due to many large fallen trees and brush between wet meadows which is the nature of a wilderness area.

A wilderness addition was proposed for areas just outside the present boundaries including Indian Meadow (near Hay Meadow) and the lake for which the wilderness is named. These 2,000 acres (8.1 km^{2}) have been identified by the forest service for having ancient forests of white fir, western white pine, sugar pine, lodgepole pine, red fir, incense cedar and Jeffrey pine. This proposed addition did not make it into the 2006 Northern California Coastal Wild Heritage Wilderness Act.

== See also ==
- Lassen National Forest
- Lassen Volcanic National Park
- Wilderness Act
- List of U.S. Wilderness Areas
- List of old-growth forests
