= Loomis Museum =

- Loomis Visitor Center
- U.S. National Register of Historic Places
- U.S. Historic district – Contributing property
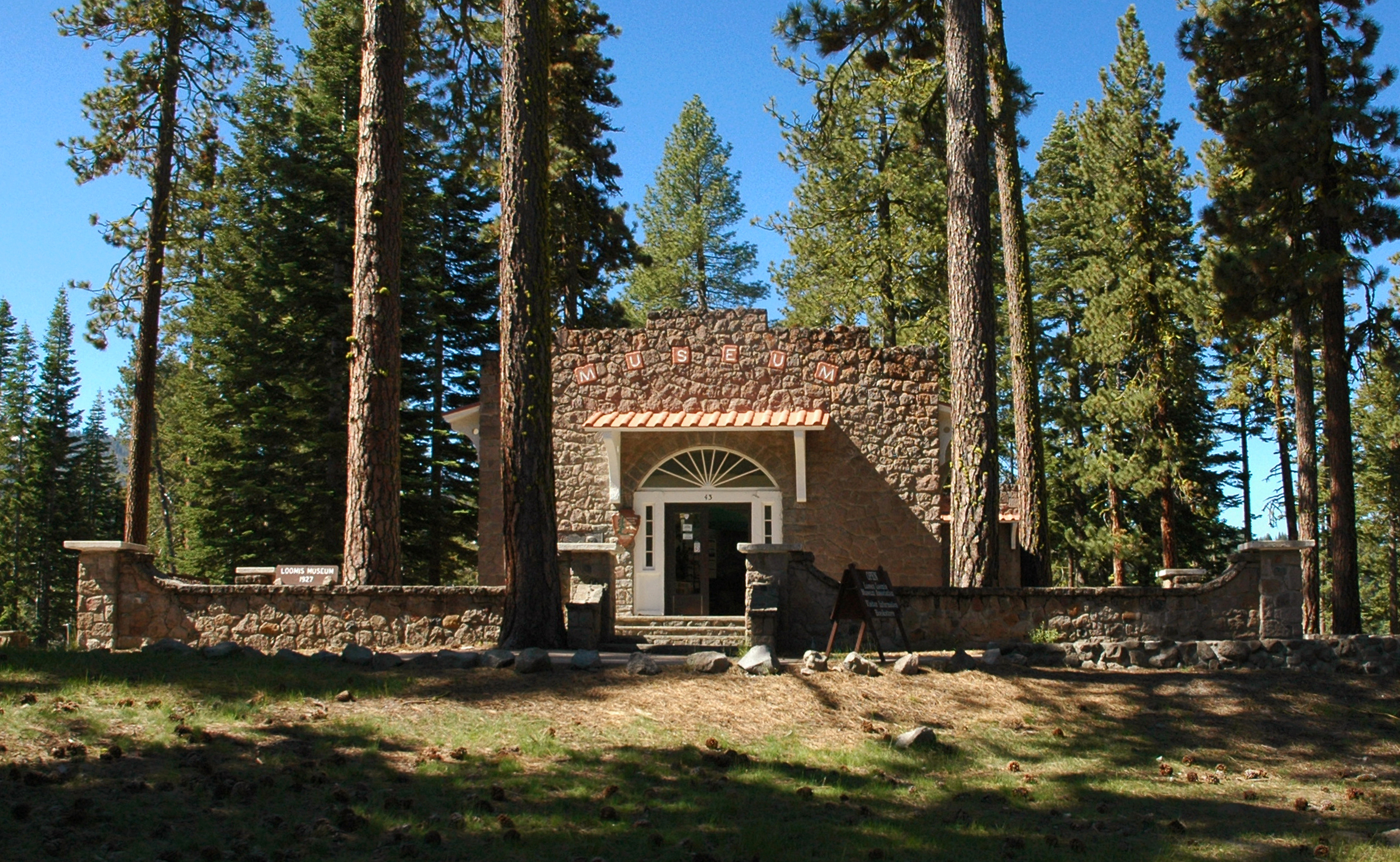

- Location within California Location within the United States
- Location: Lassen Volcanic National Park, Shingletown, California
- Coordinates: 40°32′10.21″N 121°33′47.08″W
- Area: 1 acre (0.40 ha)
- Built: 1927
- NRHP reference No.: 75000177
- Added to NRHP: February 25, 1975

The Loomis Museum, also known as the Loomis Visitor Center, the Manzanita Lake Visitor Center and the Manzanita Lake Museum, was built by Benjamin Franklin Loomis in 1927 near Manzanita Lake, just outside Lassen Volcanic National Park in California, USA. Loomis was a local homesteader and photographer who documented the 1915 eruptions of Lassen Peak, and was instrumental in the 1916 establishment of the national park. In 1929 Loomis donated the museum and 40 acres (16 ha) of surrounding lands to the National Park Service, which since then has used the structure as an interpretational facility.

Loomis had desired that the headquarters of the new park be established at Manzanita Lake, but an alternate site was chosen by the Park Service. Loomis and his wife Estella started building their own museum to exhibit photographs taken by Loomis and others, as well as geological exhibits and artifacts of local Native Americans. The building was dedicated on July 4, 1927 as the Mae Loomis Memorial Museum, named after their only child, Luisa Mae Loomis, who had died in 1920.

== Description ==
The Loomis Museum is a one-story rectangular building built of local volcanic rock in cut-face random ashlar coursing. The main body of the museum is about 25 feet (7.6 m) by 60 feet (18 m), with small extensions to either side at the rear, making the building T-shaped in plan. The building is characterized by its prominent crenelated stepped parapets. Contrasting with the rustic character of the stonework, the main entrance features formal sidelights and a fanlight. A small bracketed shed roof shelters the entrance, and the side elevations have similar shed projections down their length., all roofed with green tile. The interior is primarily composed of a single large room.

About 45 feet (14 m) to the northeast of the museum stands a seismograph building of similar design, measuring about 10 feet (3.0 m) by 12 feet (3.7 m). The station was built by the Loomises in 1926. It features three large windows that allow visitors to view the seismographic equipment within.

Described in 1952 as "ugly quasi-Spanish", the Loomis Museum was briefly considered for demolition and replacement during the Mission 66 program. The museum and seismograph station were placed on the National Register of Historic Places on February 25, 1975. The museum was renovated in 1994, the seismograph building in 1995. It is now used as a visitor contact center by the Park Service. The museum and seismograph building are also part of the Manzanita Lake Naturalist's Services Historic District.

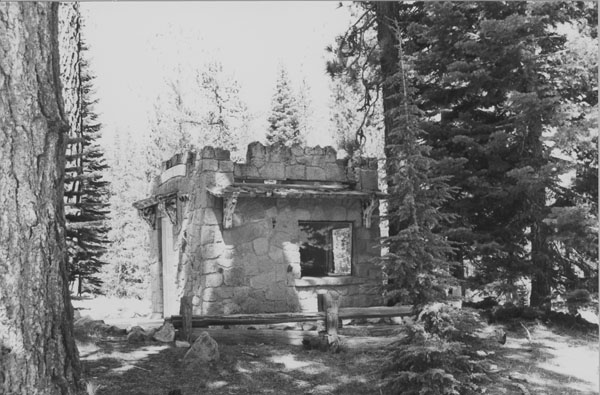
Historic photograph of the Loomis Seismograph Station

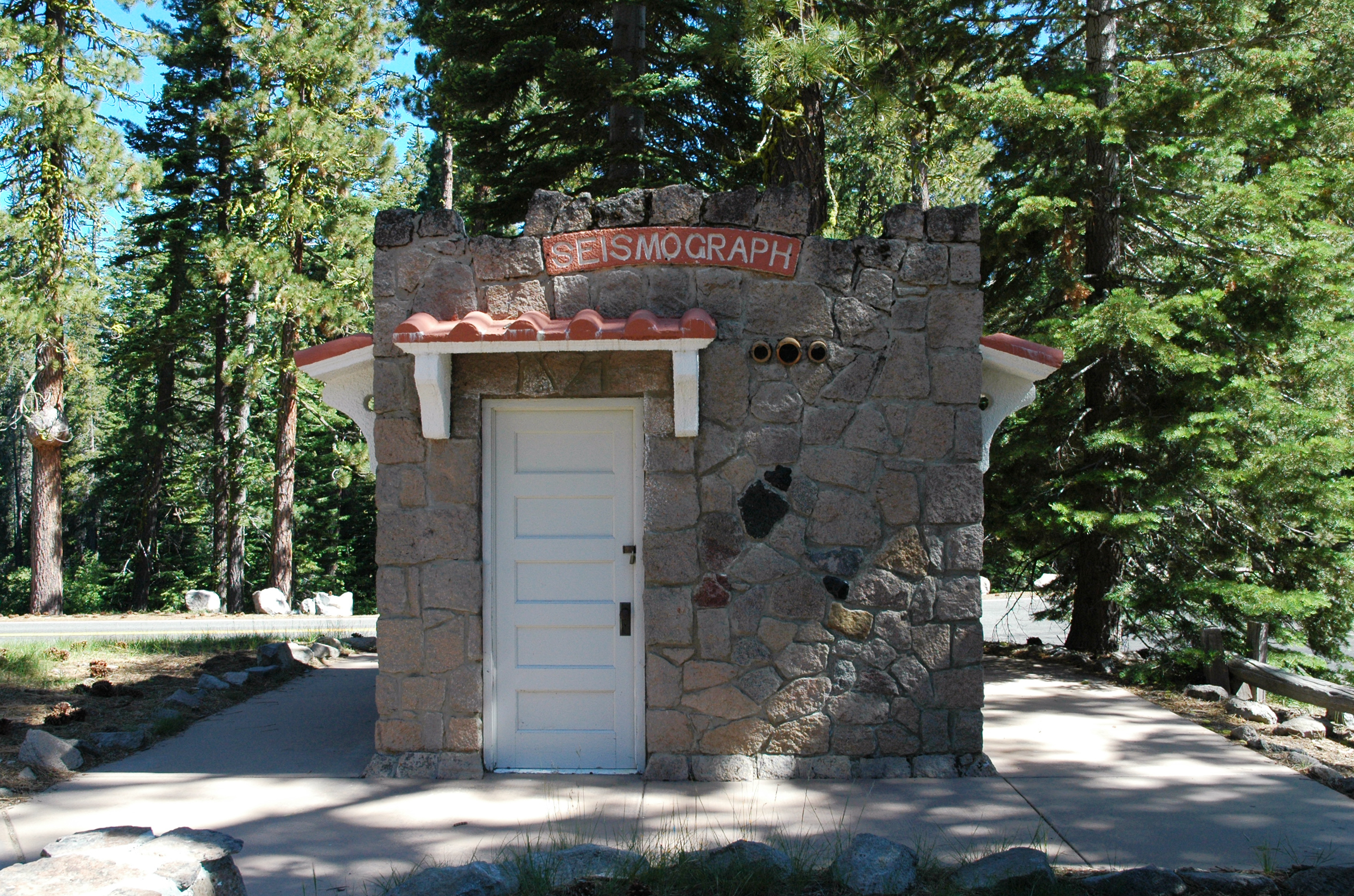
The Seismograph Station at present (2011)
