= Lassen National Forest =

United States national forest

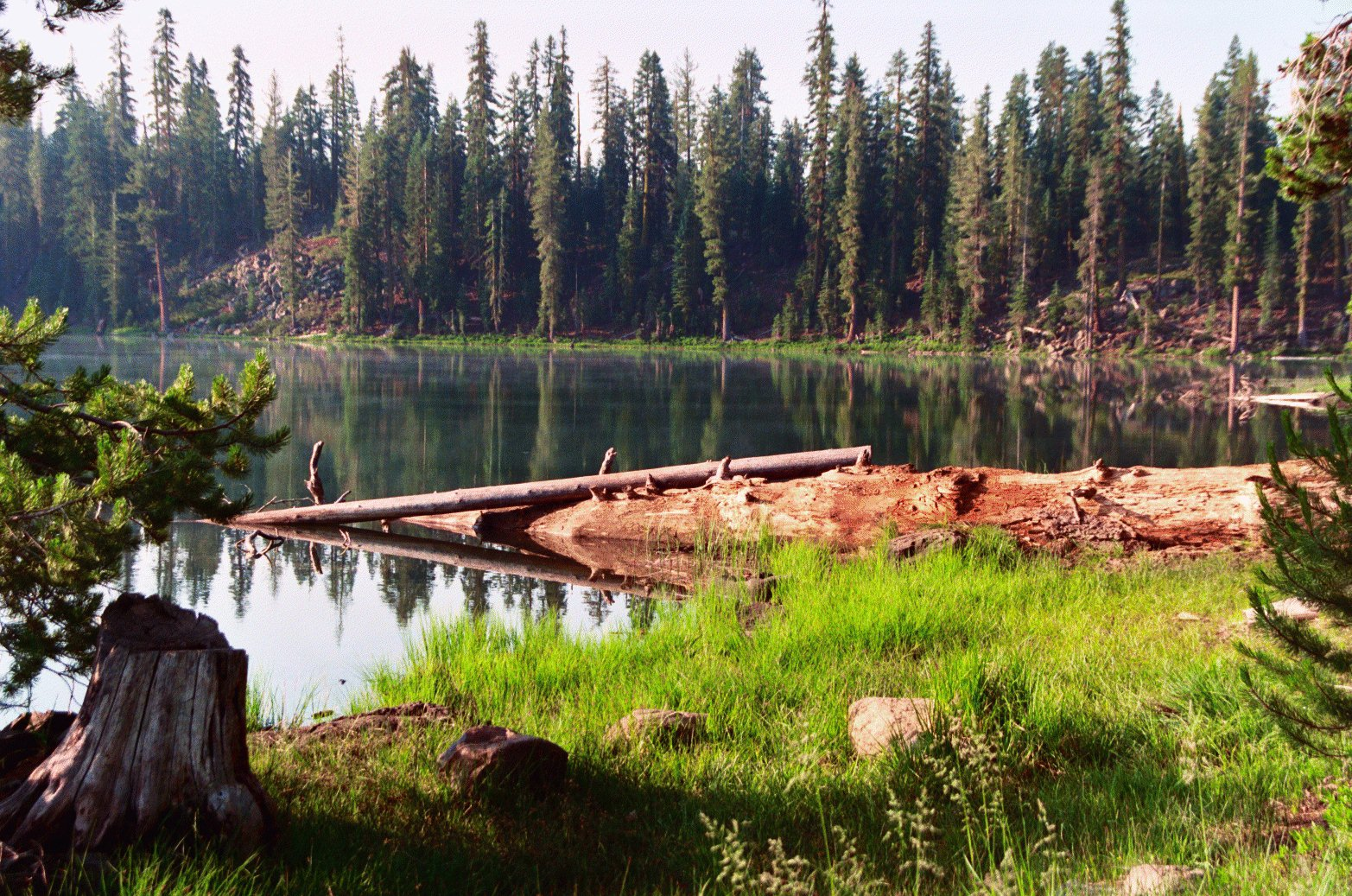
- Echo Lake in Lassen National Forest
- Interactive map of Lassen National Forest
- Nearest city: Susanville, California
- Coordinates: 40°30′01″N 121°00′01″W
- Area: 1,070,344 acres (4,331.53 km^{2})
- Established: June 2, 1905
- Governing body: U.S. Forest Service
- Website: Lassen National Forest

Lassen National Forest is a United States national forest of 1,700 square miles (4,300 km^{2}) in northeastern California. It is named after pioneer Peter Lassen, who mined, ranched and promoted the area to emigrant parties in the 1850s.

== Overview ==
Lassen National Forest is located about 80 miles (130 km) east of Red Bluff, California. It is bordered by Sierra Nevada mountain range to the south, the Modoc Plateau to the east and California's Central Valley to the west. The forest is in parts of Lassen, Shasta, Tehama, Plumas, and Butte counties. Forest headquarters is located in Susanville, California. There are local ranger district offices in Chester, Fall River Mills, and Susanville.

The forest was formed in 1905 when it was named one of the National Forest Reserves, which evolved into the National Forest system.

The forest was first named the Lassen Peak Forest Reserve because of Lassen Peak, a volcano which is in the southernmost portion of the Cascade Range volcanoes. Mt. Lassen erupted with explosive force in 1915. The forest borders Lassen Volcanic National Park. The forest has two major river systems as well as many lakes, cinder cones and lava flows.

Surveys estimate the forest contains 92,000 acres (37,000 hectares) of old growth. Sierra Nevada mixed conifer forests (Coast Douglas-fir (Pseudotsuga menziesii var. menziesii), Ponderosa Pine (Pinus ponderosa), and White Fir (Abies concolor)), Jeffrey Pine (Pinus jeffreyi) forests, Red Fir (Abies magnifica) forests, and Lodgepole Pine (Pinus contorta) forests are the most common types. It is a major source of lumber products.

=== Wilderness areas ===
There are three officially designated wilderness areas within Lassen National Forest that are part of the National Wilderness Preservation System. A small portion of one extends onto land that is managed by the Bureau of Land Management (as indicated).

- Caribou Wilderness
- Ishi Wilderness (partly BLM)
- Thousand Lakes Wilderness

== History ==
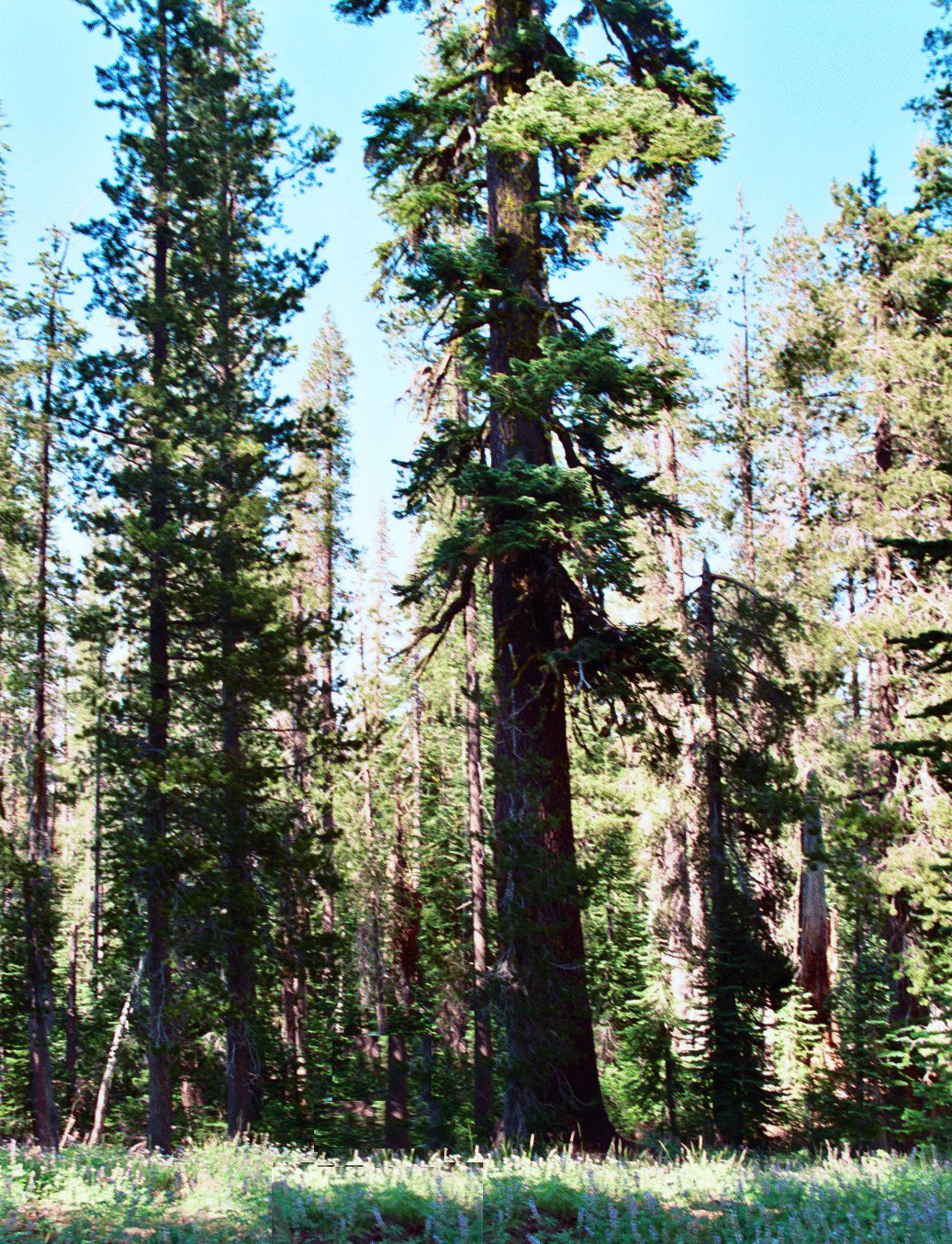
Old growth red fir (Abies magnifica) tree in Lassen National Forest, California

=== Peter Lassen ===
Peter Lassen will be long remembered with having a hospital, college, high school, street, mountain peak, creek, national park, county, and national forest each carrying his name. He was ambitious, his timing was perfect, and, like his contemporary pioneer, Johann Augustus Sutter, everything that could go wrong, did go wrong.

Lassen was murdered by an unknown person in the Black Rock Desert, Nevada Territory, two months after being profiled by Hutchings' Illustrated California Magazine.

The profile is contained in the February 1859 edition of Hutching's. Lassen was murdered April 26, 1859. The murderer was never found, but the list of suspects is long: Disgruntled clients of the Lassen Trail or various business associates were among those suspected.

The conclusion of the magazine profile includes this quote from Lassen: "Beware of bad partners, and nine-tenths of the lawyers, and if need be, add the other tenth, and thus eschew law and lawyers altogether." Apparently his killer heeded the advice.

Lassen, Edward Clapper and Americus Wyatt, were on a silver mining expedition, camped in the Black Rock Desert north of Virginia City, Nevada Territory. This was the beginning of the Comstock silver excitement in northern Nevada. Clapper and Lassen were both shot and killed as the trio was breaking camp. Wyatt survived and was the only witness. Officially a band of Paiute Native Americans received blame but few pioneers believed the story.

Lassen's body was recovered and buried near his cabin at Honey Lake Valley. Clapper's remains remained in what is now known as Clapper Canyon. A partial skeleton was discovered there by hikers in 1991, and Clapper's remains have since been interred near Lassen's grave. Susanville, the seat of Lassen County is in the Honey Lake Valley.

Lassen was born on October 31, 1800, in Farum, Denmark, and emigrated to Mexican California around 1840 from the Oregon Territory. Like Sutter, he acquired Mexican citizenship (1844) and applied for a land grant (1843) of 5 square leagues on the south bank of Deer Creek in what is now Butte County, California. This grant provided access to the Sacramento River, an important issue during the pioneer period for transportation of goods and people.

Lassen lost his estate around 1851 by mortgaging the land to further his business interests. He then migrated to the Honey Lake Valley where he attempted mining, and which is in modern-day Lassen County.

Lassen County was established on April 1, 1864, five years after his death.

=== Lassen Peak Reserve ===
The beginnings of Lassen National Forest began in 1891 with congressional passage of what has become known as the Forest Reserve Act. This bill was actually entitled: "An Act To Repeal Timber Culture Laws And For Other Purposes".

The first federal forest reserves were created soon after President William Henry Harrison signed the repeal into law. Section 24 of the act authorized the President of the United States to set aside public lands as forest reserves without further permission from Congress.

In addition to Harrison, President William McKinley set aside forest lands, as did President Theodore Roosevelt, until Congress put a stop to the practice in 1907, by banning additional set asides in six western states.

California was not among those six states but was later added to the ban.

Lassen Peak Reserve was not created until 1905, less than a month before Congress approved the Transfer Act, which took the reserves away from the United States General Land Office and the Department of Interior. Instead, the newly created U.S. Forest Service managed the lands under the Department of Agriculture. The reserves then became the National Forests. In 1908 Lassen absorbed portions of Diamond Mountain National Forest and exchanged lands with Plumas National Forest and Shasta National Forest.

Lassen National Park was carved from the Lassen National Forest in 1916, when Congress approved the creation of the National Park Service, administered by the Interior department. Lassen Peak already enjoyed protection as a National Monument, set aside by Roosevelt in 1907.

The uneasy relationship between the US Forest Service and the National Park Service continued for several decades, perhaps culminating in 1931 when Congress forbade Lassen National Park from expanding its boundaries.

Earlier, in 1906, Gifford Pinchot, Chief Forester in the Department of Agriculture, sought to move the national parks into the forest service. Pinchot was thwarted by Congressman John F. Lacey, an ardent preservationist. Pinchot's goal was to subject the Parks to logging and other aspects of his scientific management philosophy.

Later, in 1939, Interior Secretary Harold Ickes proposed the opposite-of combining the national parks and forests into an agency that would take a preservationist approach.

== Recreation ==
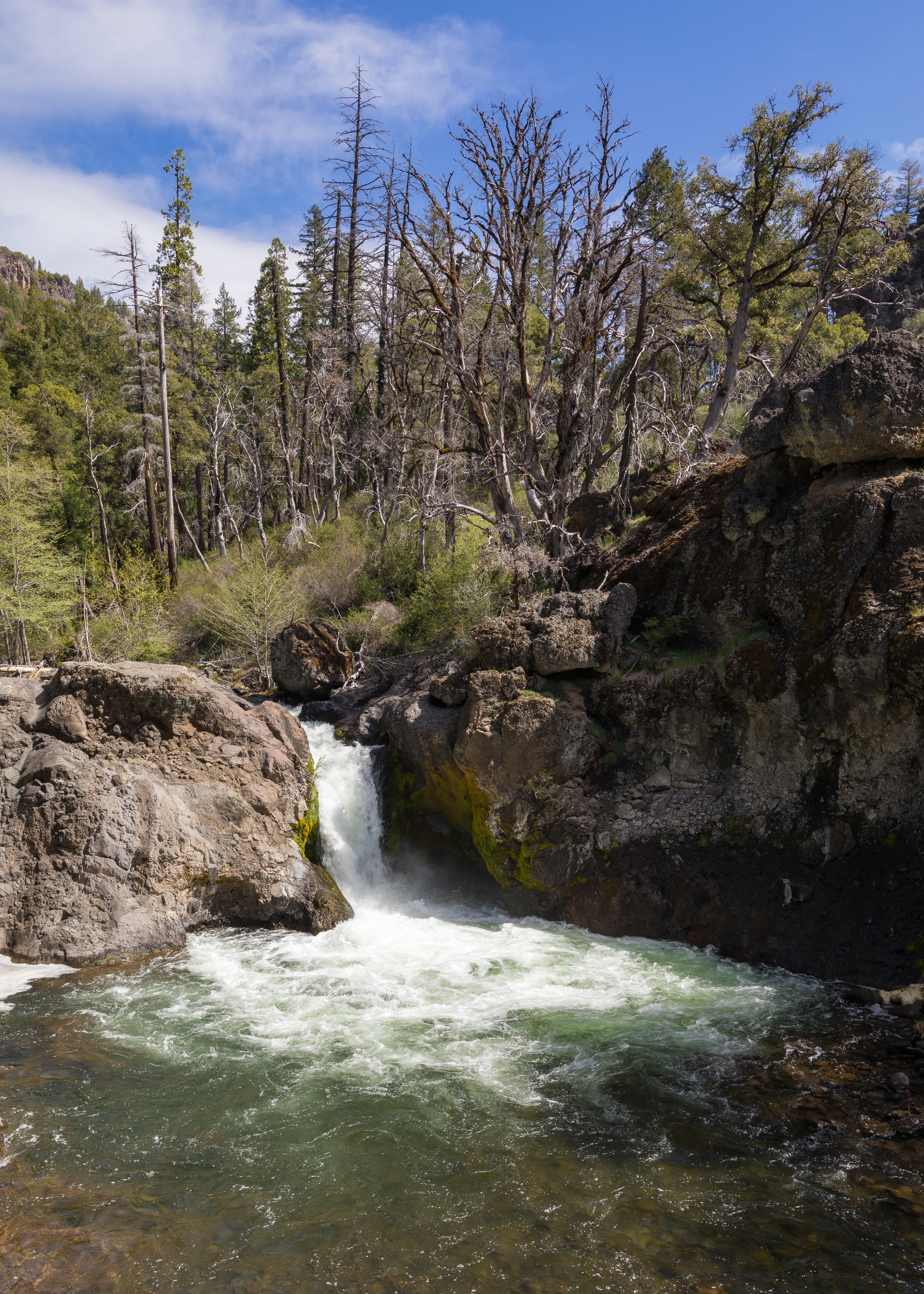
Deer Creek Falls, just off of Highway 32

Lassen National Forest, encompassing a large area, has many recreational opportunities with two large lakes nearby, a National Park, and many campgrounds and hiking trails. The forest is easily accessible from San Francisco, Sacramento and Redding.

The Pacific Crest Trail passes through the Forest and Park.

Bizz Johnson National Recreation Trail follows the rugged Susan River canyon for 16 of the trail's 25-mile (40 km) length. Built on what was once the roadbed of Southern Pacific's 130-mile (210 km) Fernley and Lassen Branch Railway, it has been converted to a riding and hiking trail. There are 12 river crossings and two tunnels along the trail with the Susan River segment being the most scenic with views of the canyon, river and mountains. Some camping is allowed on portions of the trail but some areas have camping restrictions. The railroad operated from 1914 to 1956 and was officially abandoned by Southern Pacific Railroad in 1978. The trail has four distinct seasons because of the elevation changes. The trail begins at 4,200 feet (1,300 m) on the east side of the Sierra and Cascade Ranges in Susanville, rises to a high point of 5,500 feet (1,700 m) at Westwood Junction then descends to the trails' end in the town of Westwood at 5,100 feet (1,600 m) elevation.

The Subway Cave is a lava tube located 1/2 mile north of Old Station, with developed stairs leading into the cave and guided tours offered seasonally on weekends. Parking and picnic areas are available.

Spencer Meadows National Recreation Trail is a six-mile (10 km) path through aspen groves, meadow areas, incense cedar, and bubbling springs. Beginning at the junction of state routes 36 and 89, it goes through the forest and the Park, then connects with other trails inside the Park.

Heart Lake National Recreation Trail is more than three miles (5 km) in length and follows Martin Creek with views of Lassen Peak and Brokeoff Mountain within the national park.

An historic emigrant trail established in 1852 is the Nobles Emigrant Trail. A prospecting party led by William Nobles crossed from Indian Valley to Honey Lake Valley. Nobles was later hired to shift the stream of emigrants to the town of Shasta in hopes of increasing settlers' traffic into the town. The trail goes through Susanville and past the north side of Lassen Volcanic National Park.

The Hat Creek Recreational Area of the forest has seven campgrounds scattered along the creek as well as large lava flows, lava tubes, hiking trails and views of Mount Lassen. Highway 89 follows Hat Creek through much of the forest.

Lake Almanor is just south of the forest with Forest Service land and campgrounds on the west shore. Pacific Gas and Electric Company (PG&E) operate the 28,257-acre (11,435-hectare) lake which was acquired from Great Western Power Company in 1930 when they merged with P.G. and E. The North Fork of the Feather River is the primary source for Lake Almanor, as well as a number of freshwater springs and smaller rivers. The name of the lake is derived from the Great Western Power Company's vice president, Guy C. Earl, who combined the names of his three daughters, Alice, Martha and Elanor. The Forest Service maintains 63 developed recreational sites and an indeterminate number of primitive campgrounds.

== Wildlife ==
Animals that are typically found in this forest are black bear, raccoon, coyote, bobcat, fox, mule deer, skunk, marten, cougar, brown creeper, a variety of chipmunk species, mountain chickadee, a variety of squirrel species, white-headed woodpecker, weasel, a variety of mouse species, long-toed salamander, and a wide variety of bat species.

In 2017, three wolf pups were born in this forest. Their mother is a female wolf of unknown origins. Their father is the son of OR7, a wolf with a tracking device that was the first of its kind in almost a century to migrate into California from Oregon. As of July 2020, the pack has 14 members, with 8 new pups. The father of the pups is not related to any of the other California wolves and joined the pack in 2019.

== Cultural significance ==
Lassen National Forest is also the site of significant events in California history: Ishi Wilderness was the refuge of the "last wild Indian", Caribou Wilderness was one of the first protected "primitive areas" decades before the federal wilderness system was established, and the volcanic explosion of Mt. Lassen was the first eruption to be witnessed and photographed in the history of the continental United States.

On Labor Day 1911, a Native American was discovered outside the slaughterhouse in Oroville, California. Ishi, as he came to be known, became a celebrity. He lived his remaining years at the University of California's Anthropology Museum on Parnassus Heights in San Francisco, under the sponsorship of anthropologist Alfred Kroeber. The university had no protocol for keeping a living museum exhibit, so Kroeber arranged for Ishi's employment as assistant janitor.

Ishi was Yahi, the southernmost division of the Yana and had spent the majority of his life in hiding in the rugged Deer Creek territory north of Oroville. After his discovery, he would not disclose his name. Ishi, the name given by Kroeber, was the Yahi word for man. Kroeber believed that cultural etiquette prevented Ishi from disclosing his name.

In 1908, a utility company crew surprised the small band of survivors in their camp. Ishi and the three others fled. When Ishi was discovered outside the slaughterhouse, he was alone, his hair burned short in mourning.

Ishi died in Berkeley in 1916 of tuberculosis. In 1984 Congress established the 41,100-acre (16,600 ha) Ishi Wilderness in the dry, rugged, volcanic terrain, where the last band of Southern Yanas had sought refuge. (Visitors to this wilderness are advised by the United States Forest Service to visit only during cooler months because of a lack of water during the summer.)

A year before Ishi's death, Mt. Lassen exploded. Mt. Lassen is officially recognized as Lassen Peak by the United States Board on Geographic Names. Before the eruption on May 22, 1915, the smoking volcano became a tourist draw. Today, within Lassen Volcanic National Park, the area surrounding the volcano is known as the Devastated Area.

An ancient volcano, known as Mount Tehama is believed to have been much larger and taller than Lassen Peak. Its erosion is responsible for the topography of the national forest and the national park: a volcanic rim, with elevations beginning at 6,000 feet (1,800 m) above sea level.

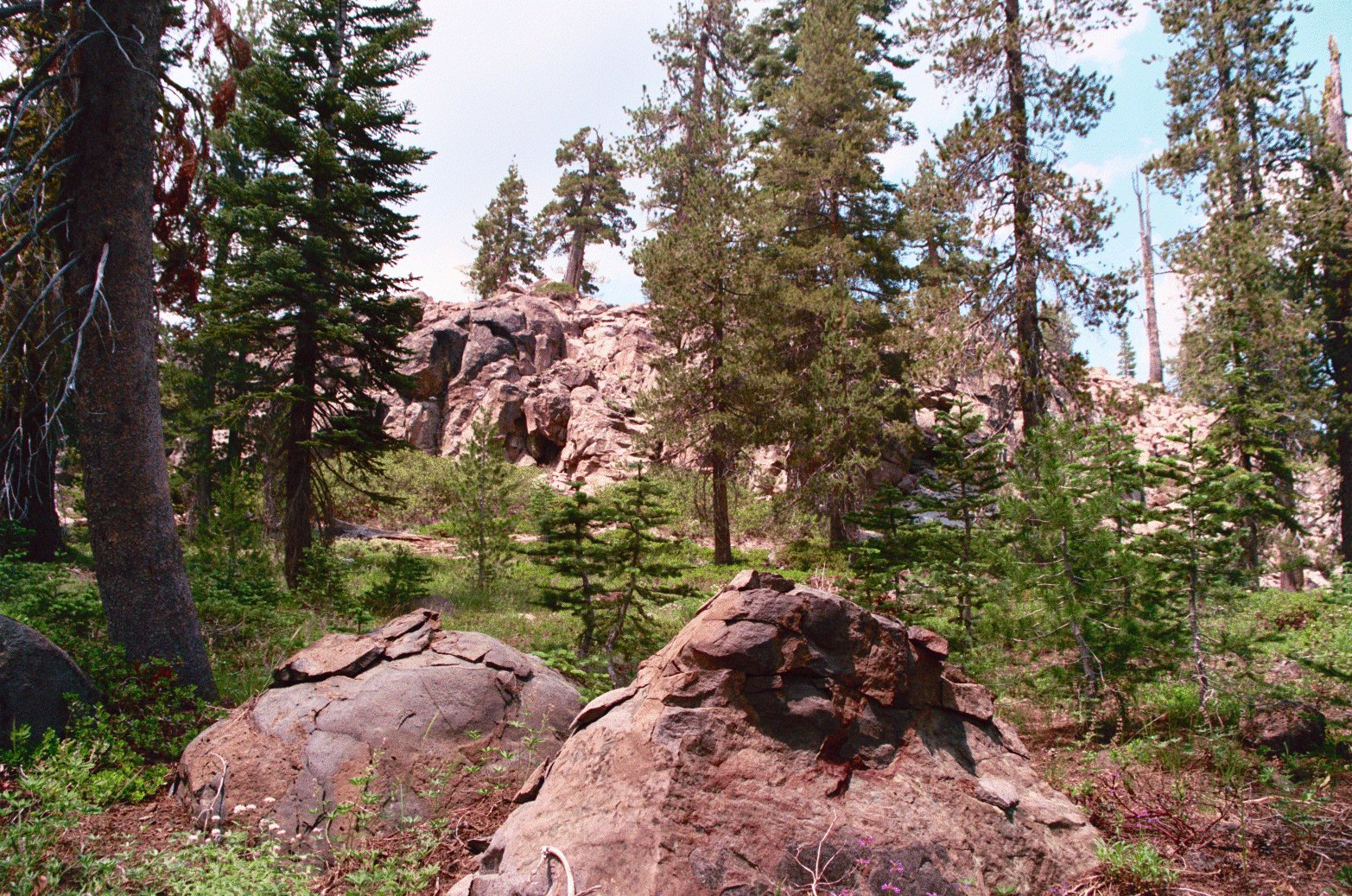
A rock mesa in Lassen National Forest, Caribou Wilderness, California

The third historical resource is the 20,000-acre (8,100 ha) Caribou Wilderness immediately east of the National Park. Caribou Wilderness received protection as a Primitive Area beginning in 1932.

In the 1920s, the managers of the Forest Service engaged in both an internal and external struggle regarding the agency's mission. Aldo Leopold and Bob Marshall, Forest Service employees, each advocated setting aside some forest areas as wilderness off-limits to mining, logging, road construction and grazing.

The first primitive area was created in 1924 in New Mexico and is now named the Aldo Leopold Wilderness. But creation of primitive areas did not become a forest agency policy until 1929.

Externally, the National Park Service, sought to expand parks from existing public lands, primarily national forest lands. The Forest Service responded by creating primitive areas. Initially these new wilderness areas received no special protections other than the official designation. Caribou Primitive area became a likely candidate for primitive status as it shares the length of its western border with the national park.

Caribou Primitive Area received greater protection in 1939, when Interior Secretary Harold Ickes sought to convince President Franklin D. Roosevelt to combine the Forest Service and the National Park Service into a new agency under the management of the United States Department of Interior. Roosevelt declined to act, but the threat of moving the Forest Service out of the United States Department of Agriculture resulted in greater protections for national forest wilderness areas. A congressional bill had earlier given the President authority to act on this new Department of Conservation.

In 1964, Caribou was among the first group of federally protected wildernesses created by the first Wilderness Act. The Lassen forest also contains the 16,335-acre (6,611 ha) Thousand Lakes Wilderness, also created in 1964.

== See also ==
- Geology of the Lassen volcanic area
- List of national forests of the United States
- Transfer Act of 1905
