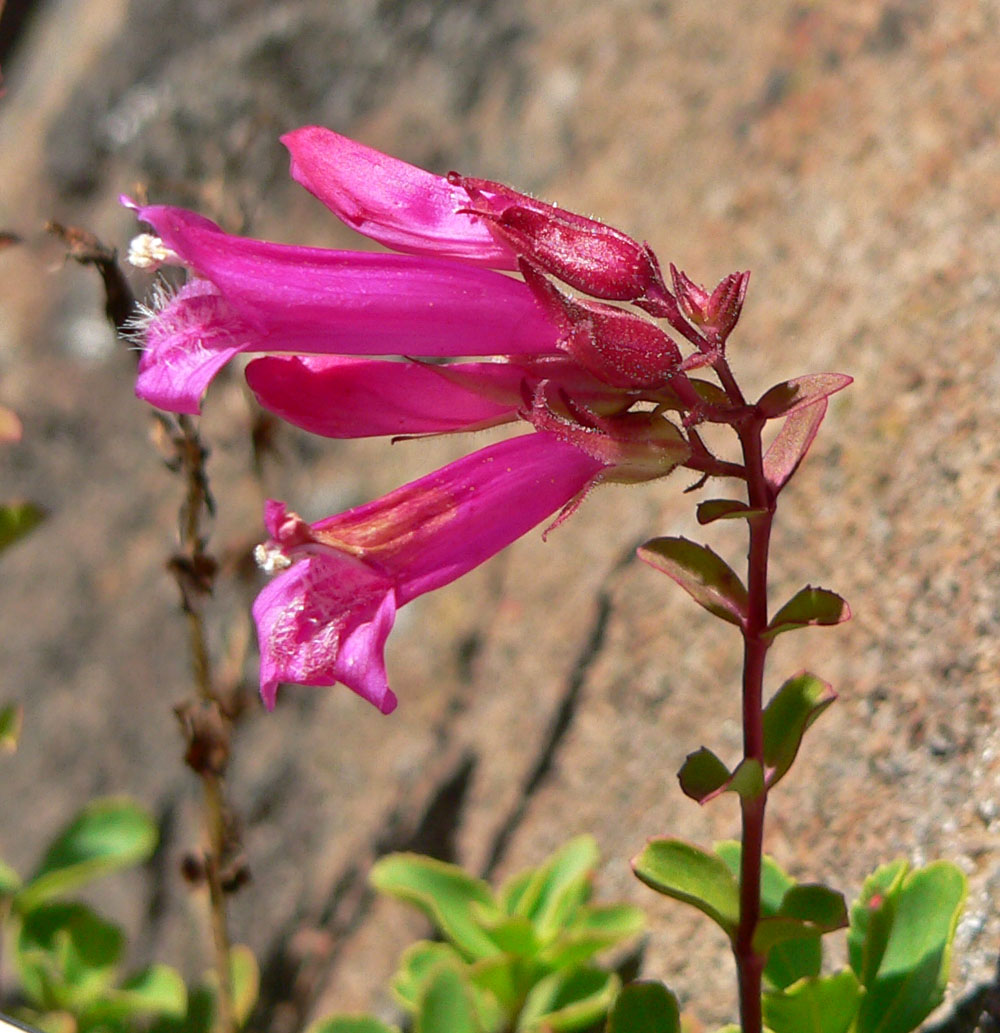

Conservation status
- Apparently Secure (NatureServe)

Scientific classification
- Kingdom: Plantae
- Clade: Tracheophytes
- Clade: Angiosperms
- Clade: Eudicots
- Clade: Asterids
- Order: Lamiales
- Family: Plantaginaceae
- Genus: Penstemon
- Species: P. newberryi

Binomial name
- Penstemon newberryi A.Gray

= Penstemon newberryi =

Species of flowering plant

Penstemon newberryi is a species of penstemon known by the common name mountain pride or Newberry's penstemon. It is native to the mountains of northern California, Oregon, and Nevada, where it grows in rocky habitat, often at high elevation, such as talus. It is a bushy, mat-forming subshrub growing up to 30 centimetres (12 inches) tall. The leaves are mostly basal on the plant, oblong or oval and toothed, measuring 1 to 4 centimetres (0.4 to 1.6 in) in length, with a few smaller pairs along the stem. The glandular inflorescence bears showy magenta flowers 2 to over 3 cm (0.8 to over 1.2 in) in length. The flower is generally tubular or funnel-shaped and has a coating of short to long and curly hairs in the mouth and on the staminode.

In cultivation in the UK, it has received the Royal Horticultural Society's Award of Garden Merit. It tolerates a wide range of positions but requires full sun.

The Latin specific epithet newberryi honors the American geologist and botanist John Strong Newberry (1822–1892).

Penstemon newberryi was the favorite flower of naturalist John Muir.
