= Thousand Lakes Wilderness =

Protected wilderness area in California, United States

- IUCN category Ib (wilderness area)
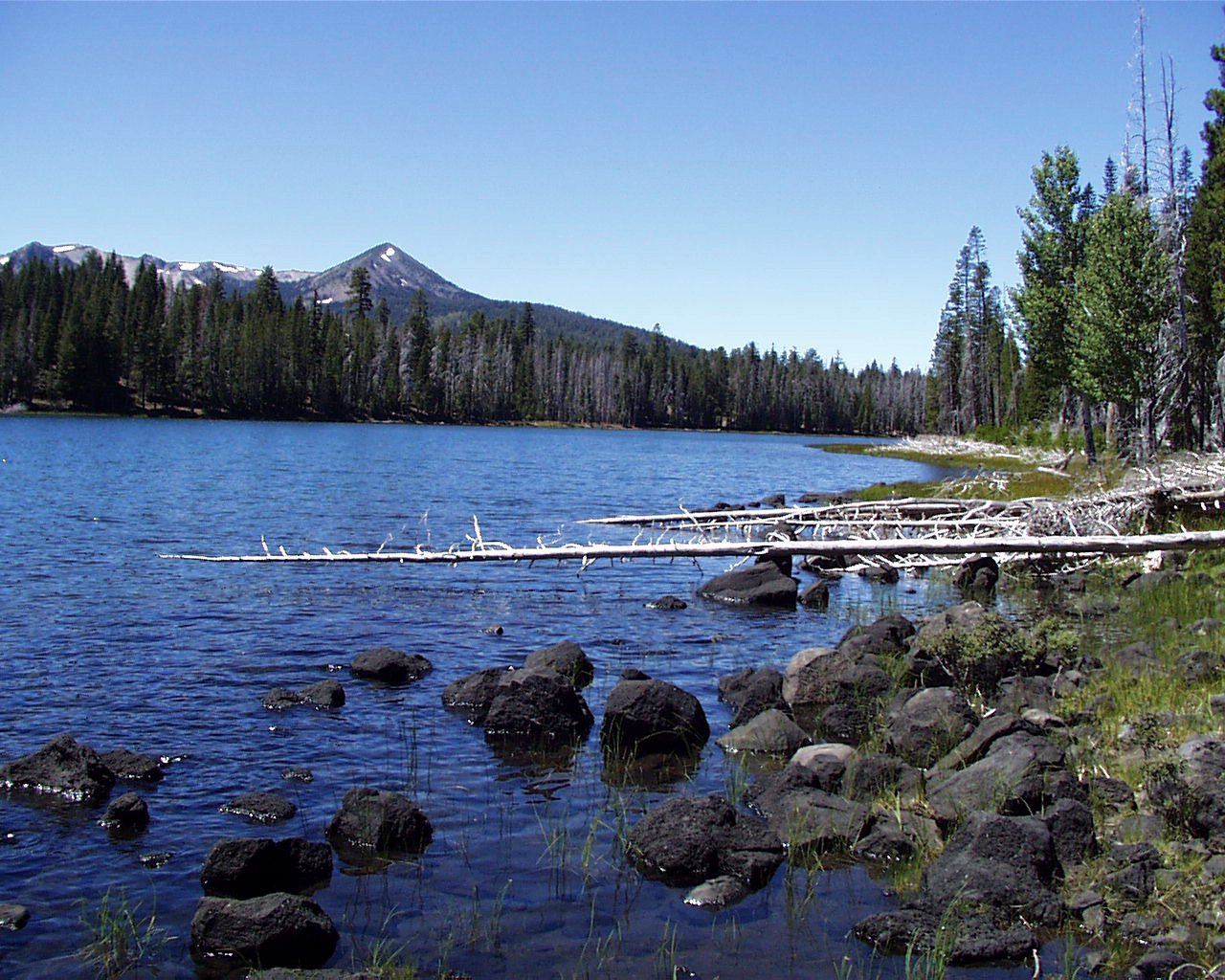

- Location within California Location within the United States
- Interactive map of Thousand Lakes Wilderness
- Location: Shasta County, California, United States
- Nearest city: Burney, California
- Coordinates: 40°42′00″N 121°35′04″W
- Area: 16,335 acres (66.11 km^{2})
- Established: 1964
- Governing body: U.S. Forest Service, Department of Agriculture

The Thousand Lakes Wilderness is located within the southern portion of the Cascade Range in northeastern California. The 16,335-acre (66 km^{2}) wilderness was established in 1964 with the passage of the Wilderness Act and is administered by Lassen National Forest. The area lies within Shasta County, midway between the town of Burney and Lassen Volcanic National Park.

Volcanic activity and glaciers have combined to create the current topography. The area is dominated by Crater Peak (8677 ft), the highest point in the Lassen National Forest. The lowest point in the wilderness, 5546 feet, occurs at the base of the volcano. This peak is a reminder of the glacial action that eroded the original, much larger Thousand Lakes Volcano and created the many small lakes and ponds scattered through the region. Some of the volcanic activity is relatively recent—Hall Butte is a cinder cone that erupted perhaps 500 years ago.

Despite its name, there are considerably fewer than a thousand lakes—about seven major lakes lie within the wilderness. The largest is Eiler Lake, named after Lu Eiler the person who discovered Thousand Lakes Valley. All of the larger lakes contain populations of trout. Wildlife includes black-tailed deer, black bear, pika, pine marten, northern goshawk, spotted owl, pileated woodpecker, and Clark's nutcracker. Even elk have been known to visit occasionally.

There are four trailheads providing access into the wilderness and approximately 21 miles (34 km) of trails.
