= Viola, California =

Unincorporated community in California, United States

- Unincorporated community
- Location within California Location within the United States
- Coordinates: 40°31′05″N 121°40′40″W
- Country: United States
- State: California
- County: Shasta
- Elevation: 4,439 ft (1,353 m)
- Time zone: UTC-8 (Pacific (PST))
  - Summer (DST): UTC-7 (PDT)
- Area code: 530
- GNIS feature ID: 1660106

Viola is an unincorporated community in Shasta County in the U.S. state of California. The community is located along California State Route 44, 38 miles (61 km) east of Redding.
