= Geology of the Lassen volcanic area =

Geology of a U.S. national park in California

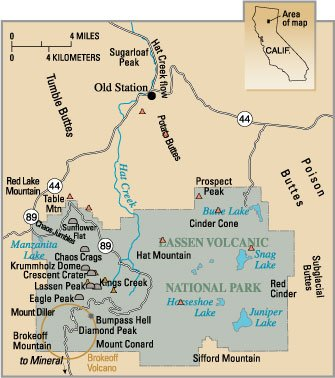
Eruptions in the Lassen volcanic area in the last 70,000 years. Circle shows base of Mount Tehama. See timeline image.

The Lassen volcanic area presents a geological record of sedimentation and volcanic activity in and around Lassen Volcanic National Park in Northern California, U.S. The park is located in the southernmost part of the Cascade Mountain Range in the Pacific Northwest region of the United States. Pacific Oceanic tectonic plates have plunged below the North American Plate in this part of North America for hundreds of millions of years. Heat and molten rock from these subducting plates has fed scores of volcanoes in California, Oregon, Washington and British Columbia over at least the past 30 million years, including these in the Lassen volcanic areas.

Between 3 and 4 million years ago, volcanic-derived mud flows called lahars streamed down several major mountains that included nearby but now extinct Mount Yana and Mount Maidu to become the Tuscan Formation. Basaltic and later andesitic to dacitic flows of lava covered increasingly larger areas of this formation to eventually form the lava plateau upon which the park is situated. About 600,000 years ago, Mount Tehama started to rise as a stratovolcano in the southwestern corner of the park, eventually reaching an estimated 11,000 ft (3,400 m) in height.

Roughly 27,000 years ago, a dacite lava dome quickly pushed its way through Tehama's former north-eastern flank, becoming the approximately 1,000 ft (300 m) shorter Lassen Peak. Lassen's shape was significantly altered by glacial erosion from 25,000 to 18,000 years ago during the Wisconsin glaciation. Since then, smaller dacite domes such as the 1,100-year-old Chaos Crags have formed around Lassen. Phreatic (steam explosion) eruptions, dacite and andesite lava flows along with cinder cone formation have persisted into modern times. Most notable of these is the eruption and formation of Cinder Cone in the mid- to late 17th century and the eruption of Lassen Peak in the early 20th century. The only activity since then has been the constant bubbling of mud pots and steaming of fumaroles from the various geothermal areas in Lassen Volcanic National Park. The potential exists for renewed vigorous volcanic activity that could threaten life and property in the area.

== Regional geologic setting ==
=== Current setting ===
The Lassen volcanic area lies at the southern extremity of the Cascade Range, which extends northward some 500 mi (800 km) from Lassen Peak within the park through Oregon and Washington and into British Columbia. Lassen Peak is one of the Cascade Volcanoes that form a segment of a ring of volcanoes that circle the Pacific Ocean known collectively as the 'Pacific Ring of Fire'. All four types of volcanoes found in the world—shield, composite, cinder cone, and plug dome—are represented in Lassen Volcanic National Park.

The Cascade Volcanoes are fed by heat generated as the Gorda and Juan de Fuca tectonic plates are being subducted below the much larger but lighter North American Plate. Lying some 300 mi (480 km) offshore, the spreading center of the Gorda Plate pushes out about 1 in (2.54 cm) of new crust toward the coast of northernmost California and southern Oregon every year.

The composition of the molten rock (magma) that feeds volcanism in the Lassen volcanic area ranges widely in its content of silica or SiO_{2}; the higher the silica content, the greater the ability of the magma to trap and hold on to gas and water vapor. When high-silica (dacitic) magma rises to the Earth's surface, the trapped gases and vapors can erupt explosively to produce ash clouds and pyroclastic flows that consist of superheated gas, ash and volcanic fragments. Dacite magma that is extruded nonexplosively as lava forms domes because it is too viscous (sticky) to flow far away from its source. Low-silica (basaltic) magma is more fluid and usually erupts as lava in less explosive eruptions than dacite because gas and water vapor escape easily from it. Eruptions of basalt magma typically produce elongate lava flows, as well as build cinder cones (piles of small frothy lava fragments or 'cinders') around volcanic vents.

Basaltic volcanism in the Lassen volcanic area occurs mainly along chains of vents aligned in a north or northwest direction, parallel to regional faults. Examples include Poison Buttes, Subglacial Buttes, Tumble Buttes, the Prospect Peak-Red Cinder area, the east side of the Hat Creek Valley and Potato Buttes-Sugarloaf area, and the Red Lake Mountain area. Prolonged basaltic volcanism at a single site can produce a sizeable edifice, like the broad, relatively flat shield volcanoes of Prospect Peak and Sifford Mountain. Unlike other Cascade volcanoes, Lassen's large plug dome and composite volcanoes are in close proximity to the smaller cinder cone volcanoes that surround the volcanic center.

Northwest of the park lies the Klamath Mountains (a collective term for the Siskiyou, Trinity, Salmon and Marble mountain ranges). To the west lies the Sacramento Valley. Just south of the park begins the Sierra Nevada mountain range, and to the east lie the Modoc Plateau and then the Great Basin.

=== Geologic history of the region ===
The major volcanoes of the Cascade Range are fed from heat generated as tectonic plates dive below North America.

All rock now exposed in the area of the park is volcanic, and unconformably overlies much older sedimentary, metamorphic and igneous rock, which was formed during the hundreds of millions of years when the Lassen region underwent repeated uplifting to form mountains, only to have them worn down and submerged under encroaching seas. During the periods of submersion, sand, mud and limestone were deposited. Occasionally volcanic activity was associated with the mountain building.

About 70 million years ago, the area where the Cascade Range is now situated was under the most recent encroachment by the Pacific Ocean. The rocks that make up the modern Sierra Nevada and the Klamath Mountains were already in existence but deeply buried. Some 70 million years before (140 million years before present), the rocks that now make up the Klamaths broke away from the rocks that now make up the Sierras and moved 60 mi (97 km) west, leaving the flooded 'Lassen Strait.' This broad depression was a seaway that connected the marine basin in California with that in east central Oregon.

The entire western portion of North America was being deformed from the Laramide orogeny starting around 70 million years ago. Gradually during millions of years, crustal rocks were folded and fractured and the seas driven away. This same bending and breaking of rocks relieved pressure on the hot material beneath the Earth's crust and permitted magma to rise toward the surface. Volcanoes burst into activity starting 30 million years ago from Washington southward along the Cascades and in the area now occupied by the Sierra Nevada. This activity continued until approximately 11 or 12 million years ago. Lava and ash reached a thickness of up to 10,000 ft (3,000 m) in some areas, forming what is now known as the western Cascades. These have been eroded until they are now rolling hills. The northern end of the San Andreas Fault and the Mendocino triple junction have moved northward over time, and with them the southern margin of Cascade volcanism retreats north; it currently is located at the southern end of the Lassen national park. The extensional tectonics of the Basin and Range and the widespread fault system of the Walker Lane are also encroaching on the Lassen region and faults associated with them provide pathways for magma to reach the surface.

Meanwhile, toward the end of this activity, eruptions of a different kind took place on an unprecedented scale in eastern Oregon and Washington. From innumerable cracks, floods of highly fluid basaltic lava spread to cover an area of over 200,000 sq mi (520,000 km^{2}). Now known as the Columbia Plateau, this great lava bed of flood basalt covers much of Oregon and Washington and even parts of Idaho. Northern California's Modoc Plateau is a thinner basaltic flow which some geologists associate with the Columbia Plateau, but there are technical objections to this. The High Cascades took shape as a distinct mountain belt as a result of this upheaval and the bending of the thick blanket of volcanic rocks. During the next 10 million years, a series of new basaltic volcanic cones similar to the shield volcanoes now found in Hawaii were built.

== Formation of basement rocks ==
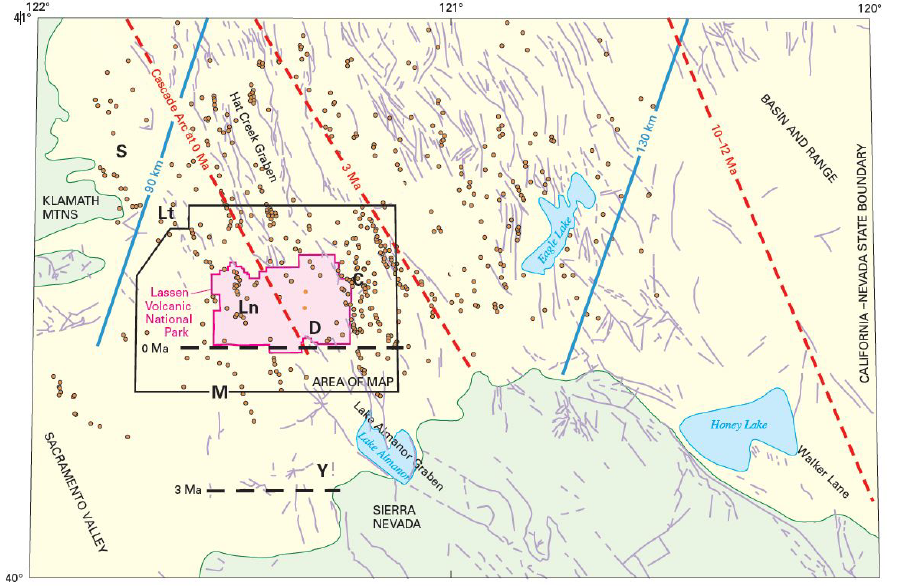
Volcanic centers map, where Y is Yana, M is Maidu, D is Dittmar, Ln is Lassen, Lt is Latour, C is Caribou, and S is Snow Mountain

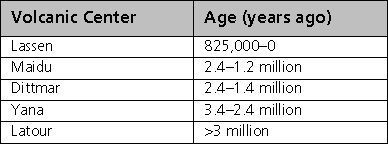

Between two and three million years ago, during the Pliocene, the Sierra Nevada was uplifted and tilted westward. A series of volcanic mudflows (lahars) from three major source areas contributed debris that covered almost 2,000 sq mi (5,200 km^{2}) to form the oldest distinctive geologic formation in the High Cascades. The resulting Tuscan Formation is not exposed anywhere in the national park but is just below the surface in many places within it. It consists mainly of tuffs but also contains conglomerates and lava sheets. The formation can reach thicknesses exceeding 1,000 ft (300 m) and is of late Pliocene age. An overlying rhyolitic lava flow gives an age of 1.5 million years.

Lassen is the fifth volcanic center to be active in the region. Latour, Yana, Maidu and Dittmar were the four preceding centers; Latour and Yana are only poorly known. One major source of the formation was Mount Yana; centered a few miles (5 km) southwest of Butt Mountain and south of the park. Mount Yana had probably reached its full size of 10,000 ft (3,000 m) in elevation and 15 mi (24 km) in diameter before Mount Maidu, the second source, had acquired half its growth. Mount Maidu, which eventually surpassed Mount Yana in size, was centered over what is now the town of Mineral, California, but has been extinct for hundreds of thousands of years (the grassy plain around the town is Maidu's caldera). A third source situated north of Latour Butte made a lesser contribution to the formation. Minor sources included an area near Hatchet Mountain Pass (northwest of Burney Mountain), dikes south and southwest of Inskip Hill and possibly Campbell Mound (north of Chico, California).

Also during the Pliocene, basaltic lavas poured forth in the vicinity of Willow Lake in the southwestern portion of the park. These were followed by a very thick sequence of very fluid andesitic lavas which erupted near Juniper Lake and flowed westward about four miles (6 km). At about the same time, other andesitic lavas poured from several vents on the central plateau to cover an area of at least 30 sq mi (78 km^{2}). Included among these flows were the Twin Lake lavas of black porphyritic andesite, which are notable in that they contain xenocrysts of quartz. The Flatiron andesites spread over the southwestern part of the park area around this time.

Somewhat later, andesitic lavas poured out from what is now Reading Peak and mainly flowed to the south and east, reaching the head of Warner Valley. By this time, the park's eastern portion had been transformed into a relatively flat plain. The activity was followed by an eruption of the Eastern basalts from volcanoes east of the park. These thick flows have subsequently eroded to produce rugged hills that limit the park on the east. Taken together, these flows built the lava plateau upon which the Lassen volcanic area is located.

== Volcanoes rise and fall in the park area ==
=== Mount Tehama and pre-Lassen volcanics ===
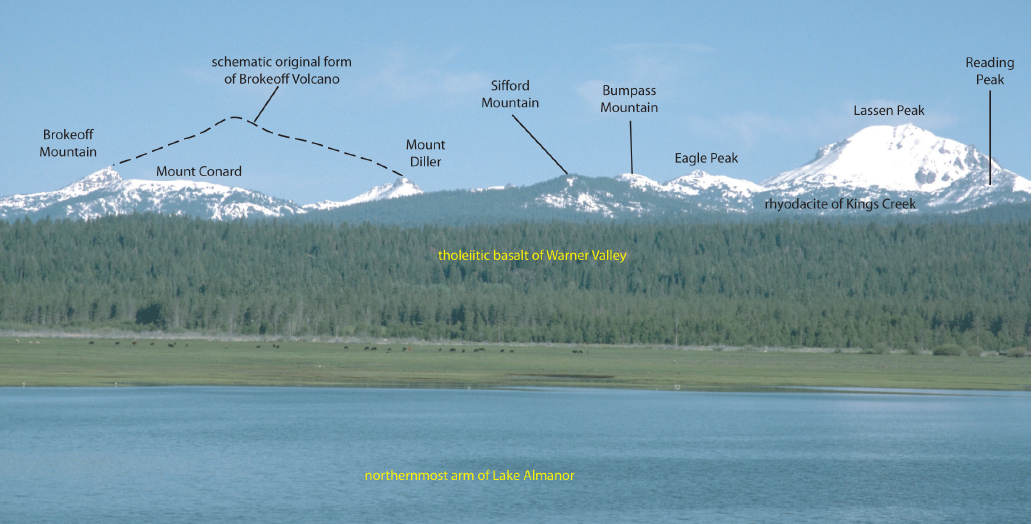
Former extent of Mount Tehama (Brokeoff Volcano)

The earliest volcanic activity of the Lassen Volcanic Center commenced 825,000 years ago. The Rockland complex formed between 825,000 and 609,000 years ago. It was the source of lava domes and lava flows of dacitic composition. Around 610,000 years ago over 130 km^{3} of rhyolite magma violently erupted onto the surface, producing massive pyroclastic flows and an ash plume several tens of kilometers high. This plume distributed ash almost entirely over the state of Nevada and sending traces as far as southeastern Idaho. As the eruption progressed the underlying magma chamber was severely drained. This caused the overlying rock that was once supported by the magma to collapse downward. Forming a massive depression known as a caldera. Over 326.7 km^{3} of tephra was erupted during this event. This could very well make the Rockland tephra the most voluminous eruption to have occurred in the Cascade Volcanic Arc, nearly twice the size of the Mazama ash. From 600,000 to 400,000 years ago, eruptions built a large conical stratovolcano called Mount Tehama (also called Brokeoff Volcano) in what is now the southwest corner of the park within the Rockland caldera complex. It was made of roughly alternating layers of andesitic lavas and tephra (volcanic ash, breccia, and pumice) with increasing amounts of tephra with elevation.

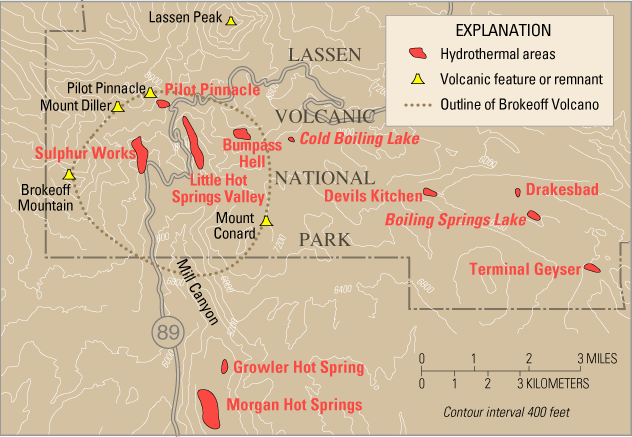
Extent of Tehama shown by outline

Tehama eventually reached an elevation of about 11,000 ft (3,400 m), was 11 to 15 miles (18 to 24 km) wide at its base, and contained 80 km^{3} (19 cu mi) of material. Its principal vent lay in the neighborhood of what is now Sulphur Works, but a second vent from which no lavas issued lay on the eastern flank of Little Hot Springs Valley. Contrary to popular belief, Bumpass Hell is not one of Tehama's main vents since it is located outside of the caldera. Tehama collapsed during the late Pleistocene, and numerous glacial advances tore down its remnants.

The largest remnants of Tehama include Brokeoff Mountain, Mount Conard, Mount Diller, and Pilot Pinnacle. Between about 385,000 and 315,000 years ago the character and locus of volcanism in the Lassen Volcanic Center changed dramatically from the andesitic (silica content between basalt and dacite) stratocone to the Lassen domefield, which consists of a core of dacite lava domes surrounded by an arc of hybrid andesite flows. The dacite domes erupted along the northern flank of Brokeoff Volcano and are divided on the basis of age into the Bumpass sequence (about 300,000–190,000 years ago) and Eagle Peak sequence (about 70,000 years ago to present day). The hybrid andesite units erupted in two groups called the older Twin Lakes sequence (about 315,000 to 240,000 years ago, contemporaneous with the Bumpass Peak sequence) and younger Twin Lakes sequence (about 90,000 to present day, contemporaneous with the Eagle Peak sequence). No volcanism is known in the Lassen volcanic center during the period from 190,000 to 90,000 years ago.

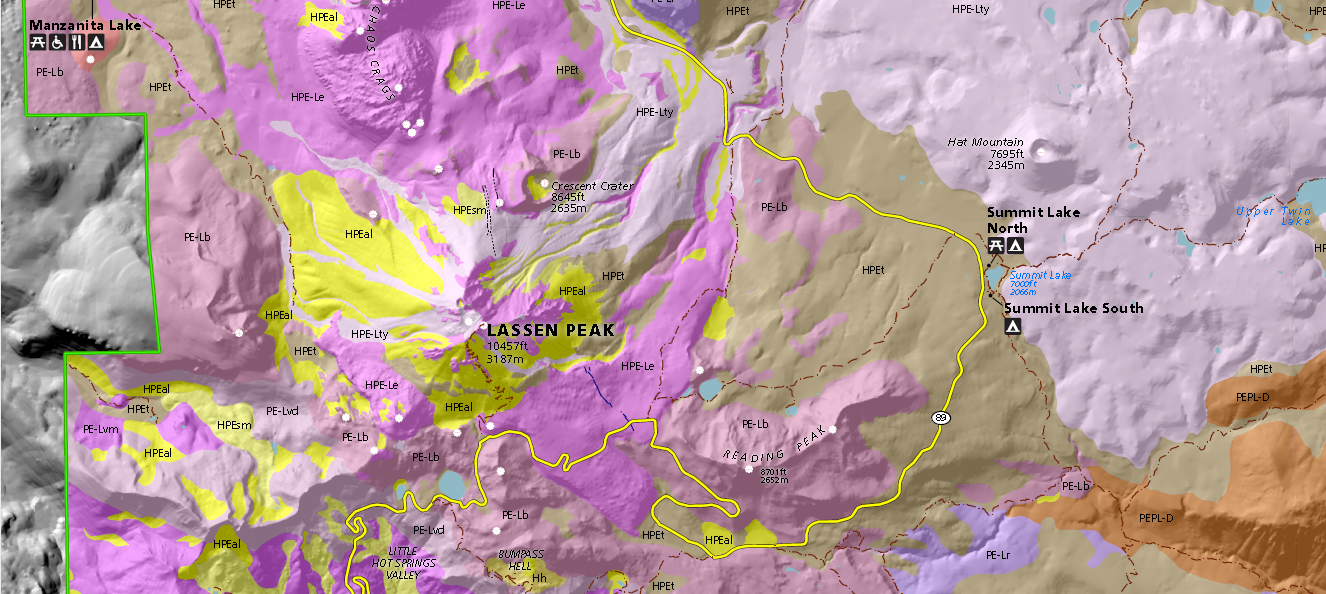
Lassen Peak geological map, where an asterisk denotes the location of a vent, HPE al is alluvium/talus/colluvium, HPE t is glacial till, and PE-Lvd is the Brokeoff Volcano Diller Sequence

Four shield volcanoes (Raker and Prospect Peaks, Red Mountain and Mount Harkness) grew to elevations of between 7,000 to 8,400 ft (2,100 to 2,600 m) at the corners of the central plateau. Raker Peak erupted andesite lavas while basalt flowed from the others. Each of these volcanoes developed a cinder cone on its summit during their last stages of eruption. Later, a mass of rhyolite was forced through the north flank of Sifford Mountain and a plug of dacite was pushed up through the west flank of Raker Peak.

In the past 50,000 years, at least seven major episodes of dacitic volcanism produced lava domes and pyroclastic deposits in the Lassen volcanic area, and another five episodes produced basaltic and andesitic lava flows. Eruptions have occurred at sites including Lassen Peak, Chaos Crags, and Sunflower Flat (explosive dacite eruptions followed by dome growth) and Tumble Buttes, Hat Mountain, and Prospect Peak (basalt eruptions). In addition, about 30 smaller volcanoes erupted basaltic lavas in the larger region surrounding the Lassen volcanic center. These volcanoes are geologically related to the Basin and Range volcanic province.

=== Development of Lassen Peak ===
Radiometric dating indicates that around 31,000 years ago a new vent opened up on the northeastern slope of Tehama, probably close to where Lassen Peak now stands. Streams of fluid dacite flowed chiefly toward the north, reaching a thickness of 1,500 ft (460 m) and covering perhaps 20 square miles (52 km^{2}). Known as the Loomis Sequence, these pre-Lassen dacites are the black, glassy, columnar lavas that now surround Lassen Peak.

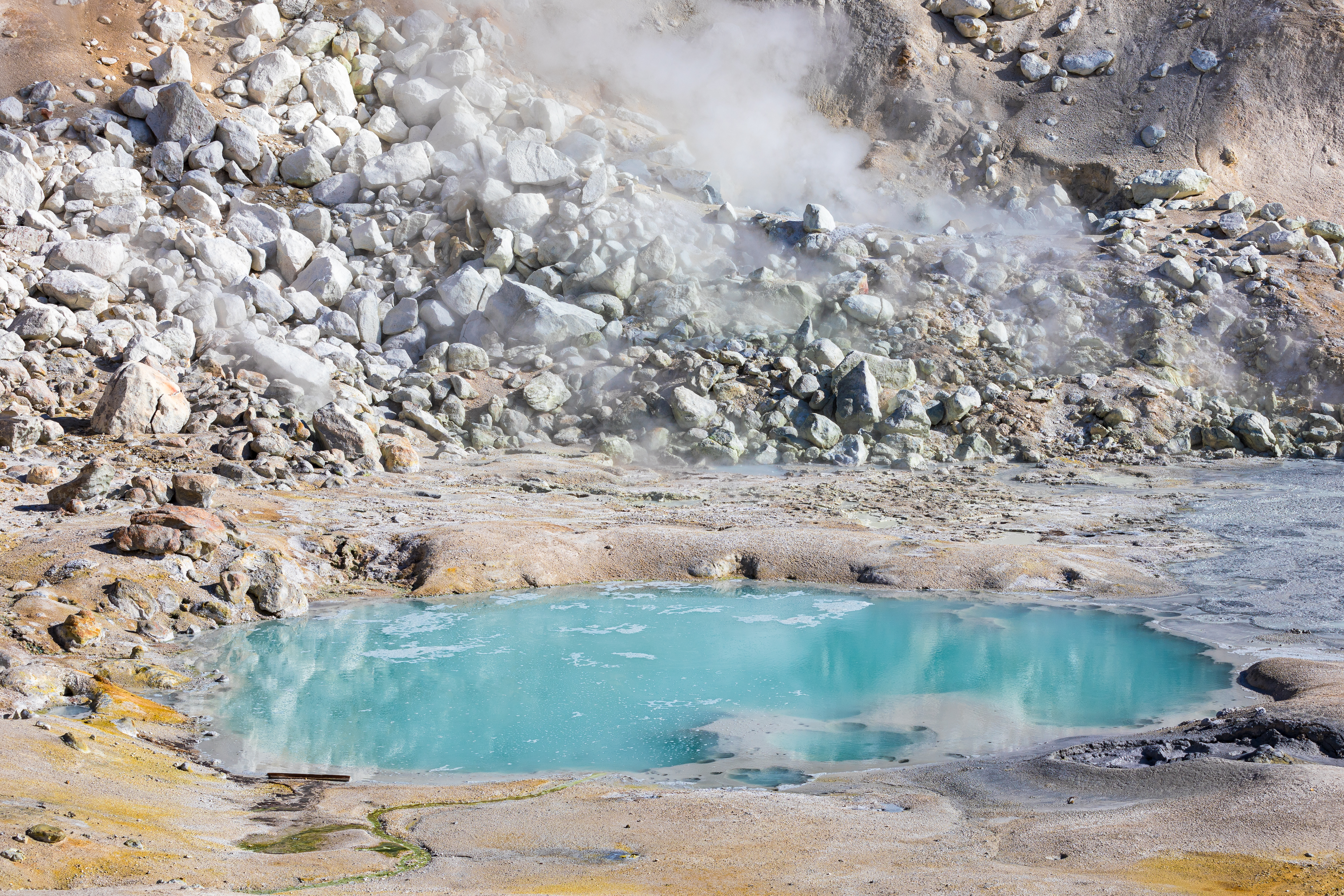
Aquamarine water pool in the Bumpass Hell hydrothermal area

Sometime between 25,000 and 31,000 years ago, Lassen Peak, a Pelean lava dome volcano, was pushed up through the pre-Lassen dacites. Lassen grew past the normal maximum size of plug dome volcanoes, 1,000 ft (300 m), and reached a height of 1,800 feet (550 m) above the surrounding plateau in as little as a few years. The growth of the pile of lava shattered the rocks previously there, forming enormous banks of talus. When Lassen Peak formed, it looked much like the nearby Chaos Crags domes do today, with steep sides covered by angular rock talus. Lassen Peak's shape was significantly altered by glacial erosion from 25,000 to 18,000 years ago during the Wisconsin glaciation. In turn the growth of Lassen Peak intercepted moisture, allowing a glacier on its northern flank to grow to almost 10 kilometers (6.2 mi) long.

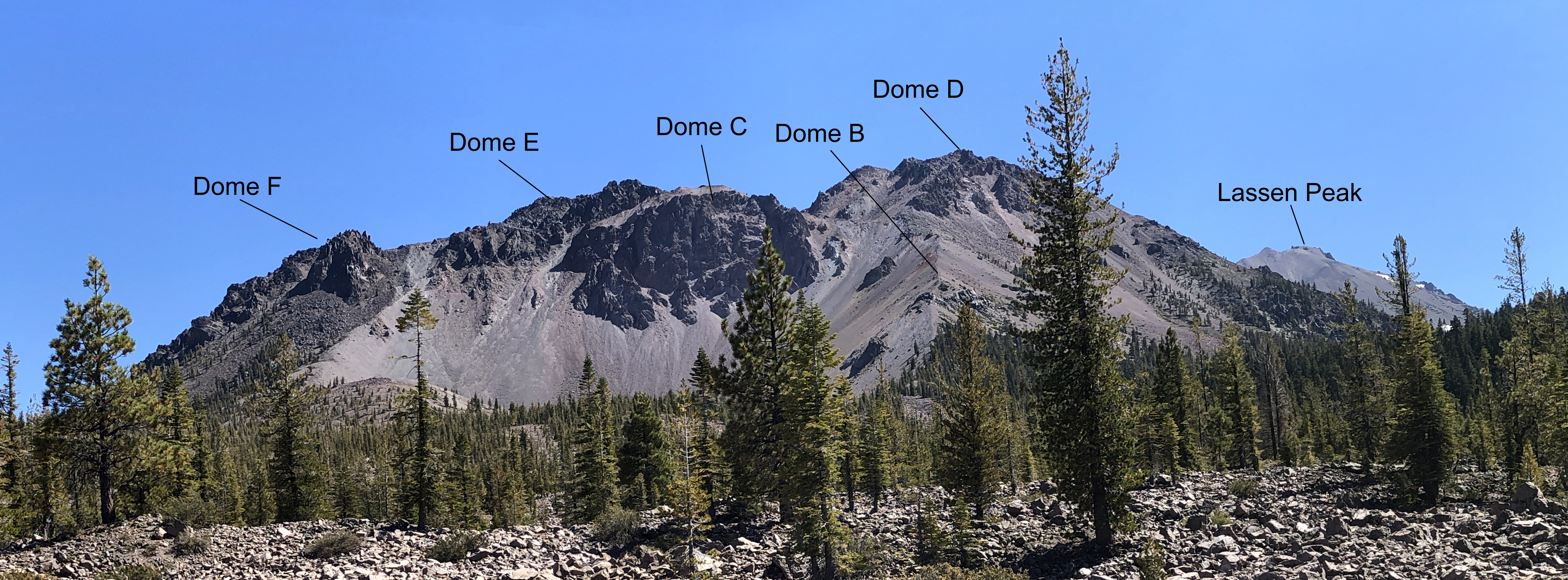
Multiple domes at Jumble Crags

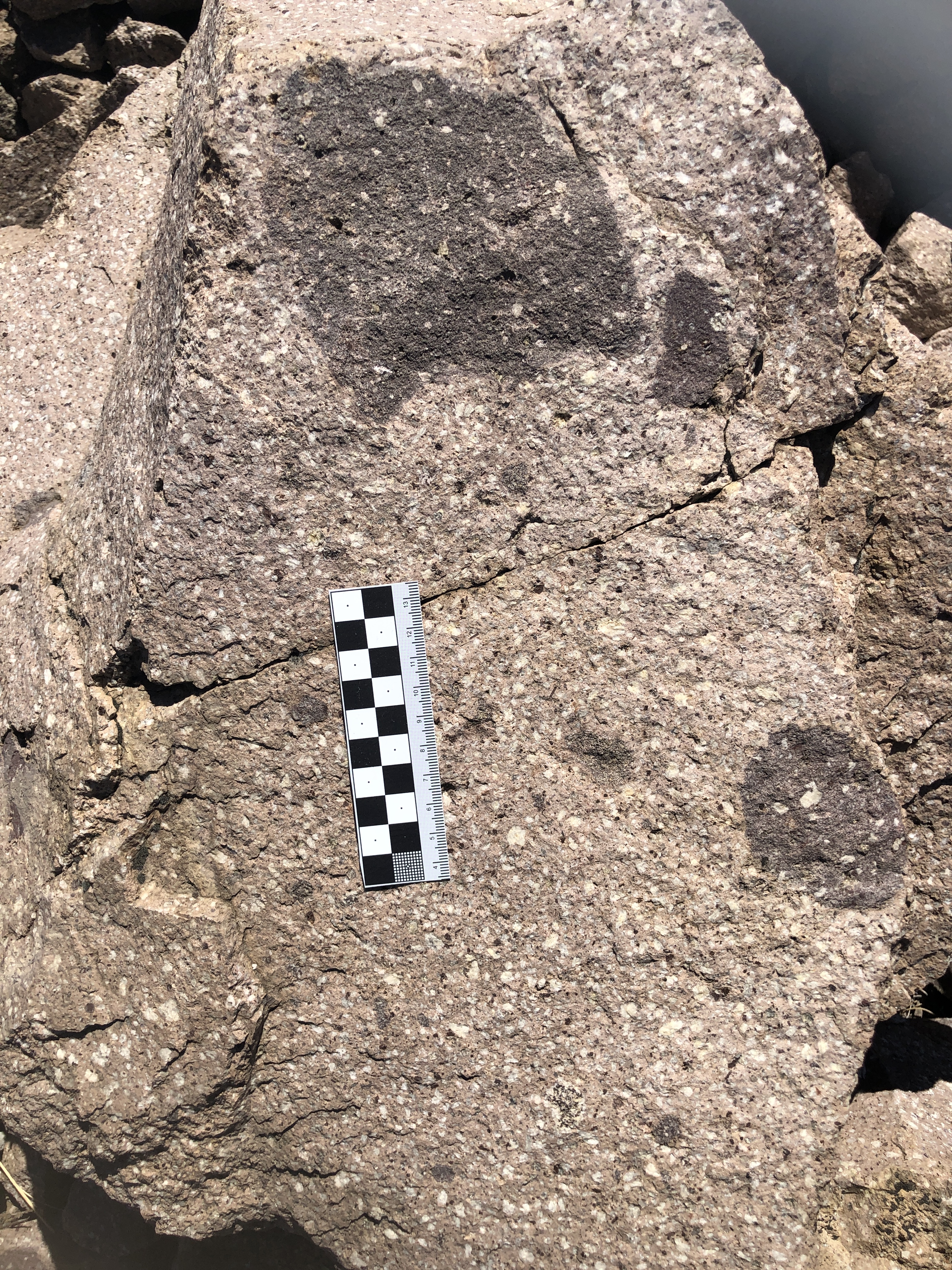
Mafic inclusion in dacite/rhyodacite of Chaos Crags

Later, but not precisely dated, eruptions from the Lassen volcanic area have formed over 30 smaller steep-sided, mound-shaped accumulations of volcanic rock, called lava domes. Crescent Crater, which at first glance appears as a parasite on Lassen's northeast flank, has been more heavily glaciated and thus is older. Other dacite domes which rose on Tehama's flanks are Bumpass Mountain, Helen Ridge, Eagle Peak and Vulcan's Castle. An upper limit of 10,000 years has been set for the domes next to Lost Creek (north domes). All of these domes must have risen with great rapidity.

=== Glacial action ===
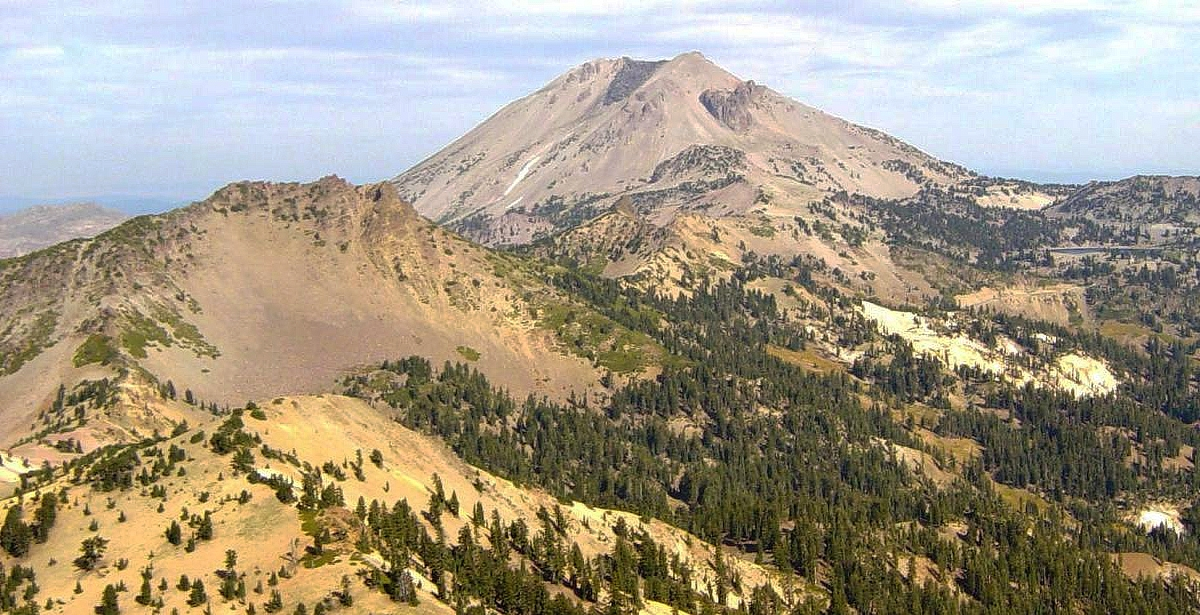
Lassen Peak from the summit of Brokeoff Mountain. Photo shows 1915 tongue of lava and Volcan's Eye.

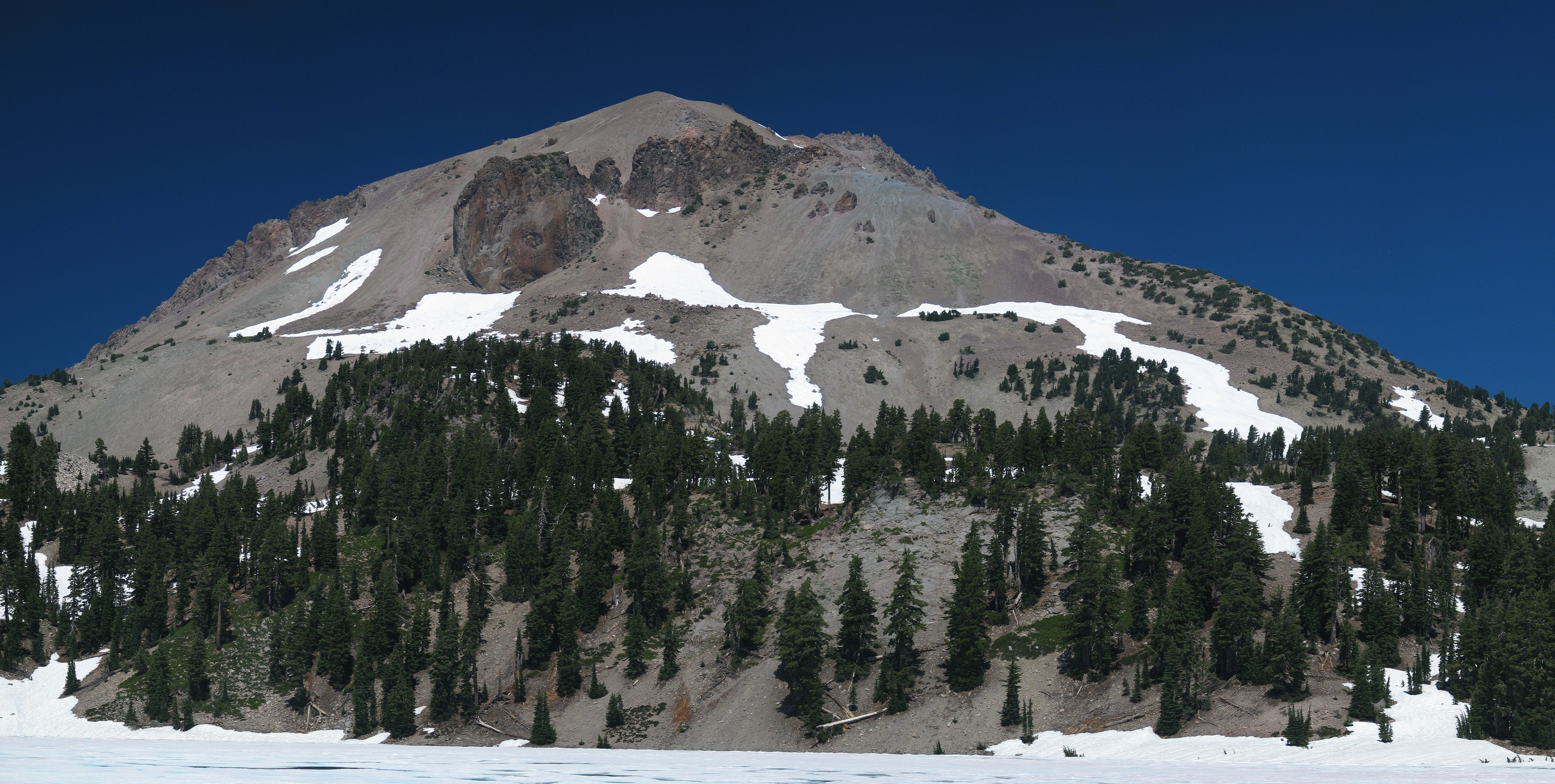
Lassen Peak as seen from Lake Helen. Lake Helen fills a cirque created by a glacier that once flowed down the side of Lassen Peak.

Glaciers existed throughout the park area during most of the Pleistocene with smaller ones persisting at higher elevations until comparatively recent times. Lassen Peak is situated at a center from which many of these glaciers originated. Glacial ice that filled Mill Creek (whose canyon is mostly post-glacial), Blue Lake Canyon, Kings Creek Meadows, Flatiron Ridge, Warner Valley and the valley of Manzanita, Hat and Lost Creeks originated from there. Indeed, Lassen Peak appears to be sitting in the depression carved by the Lost Creek Glacier.

Reading Peak formed a second center from which ice moved north into Hat Creek and Summit Creek. Ice moving southward united with some of the above glaciers and emptied into Warner Valley. On the central plateau, the ridge connecting Hat Mountain with Crater Butte served as a divide between ice flowing northward to Badger Flat and Hat Creek and that moving southward to Corral Meadows, Kings Creek and Warner Valley. Ice from Mount Harkness and Sifford Mountain also wound up in Warner Valley.

The crest of Saddle Mountain served as a divide with ice north of it moving into the depression containing Snag and Butte Lakes, while those to the south entered Warner Valley. The ice varied from a thickness of 1,600 ft (490 m) in Warner Valley to much thinner sheets in the higher mountains.

=== Post-glacial to 19th-century activity ===
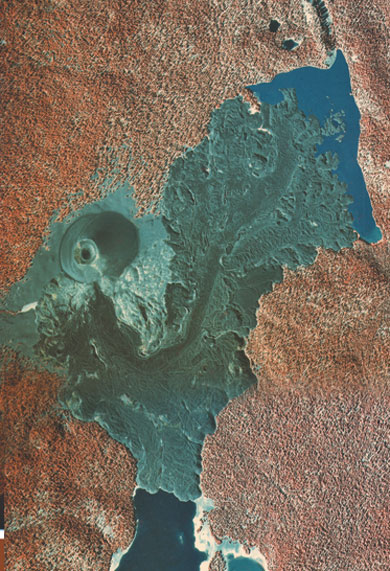
False color air photo of Cinder Cone and the Fantastic Lava Beds

Subsequent to the rise of Lassen Peak, several dacitic pumice cones developed in a rift extending northwest from the base of Lassen Peak. Then about 1,100 years ago several dacitic domes, the Chaos Crags, protruded through these cones and obliterated all but half of the southernmost cone. At least 300 years ago a series of large avalanches, possibly triggered by steam explosions, occurred on the north side of the Crags. These avalanches created their own 'air cushions' that helped accelerate them to speeds exceeding 100 mph (160 km/h) and push them partway up Table Mountain. The resulting wilderness of debris, the Chaos Jumbles, covers an area of 2.5 sq mi (6.5 km^{2}). Manzanita Lake was formed as a result of Manzanita Creek being dammed by the debris. Steam rose from the domes of Chaos Crags until 1857.

Around the mid-18th century a series of eruptions produced Cinder Cone in the northeast corner of the park, mantling an area of 30 sq mi (78 km^{2}) with ejecta in the process. Ash falling on the streams of lava pouring from the cone's east flank formed the Painted Dunes. A flow of quartz-studded basalt lava (the Fantastic Lava Beds) poured from the Cinder Cone and dammed the streams that run towards Butte Lake to the north and Snag Lake to the south.

=== Early 20th-century activity ===
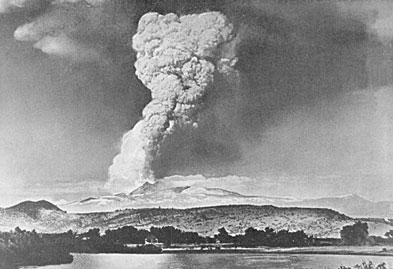
The "Great Explosion" eruption column of May 22, 1915 was seen as far as 150 miles (240 km) away. (Photograph by R.E. Stinson)

Explosions took place on Lassen Peak in 1914. Later, on May 19, 1915, a mass of lava rose in the summit crater and spilled 1,000 ft (300 m) down the western side of the volcano. Extensive lahars (mudflows) were created on the northeastern side as snowbanks were melted. The resulting debris swept down the slope. Divided by Raker Peak, part of this mudflow raced down Lost Creek; the remaining flow passed over the rise 100 ft (30 m) east of the park road and rushed down Hat Creek. A wide barren swath was torn through the forest.

A great explosion blasted out a new crater three days later on May 22. A volcanic cloud rose 40,000 ft (12,000 m), but a portion of the explosive force was deflected downward. The resulting pyroclastic flow of super-heated gas, rocks and ash roared down the same path taken by the mudflow, resulting in further damage along the headwaters of Hat and Lost Creeks. Ash from the eruption blew eastward with some fine ash falling at least as far as 200 mi (320 km) from the volcano.

The last major eruptions of Lassen Peak occurred in April through June 1917, when a new crater was created at the summit of the mountain. Less explosive activity continued through 1921. The Smithsonian considers the eruption of Mount Lassen to have ended on June 29, 1917.

Since then, the volcano has been dormant, although some steam still rises from small vents in its summit and on its flanks. Pumice ejected during the 1915 eruption of Lassen Peak is conspicuously banded with light streaks of dacite and dark andesite, which appears to represent two distinct magmas imperfectly mixed during the eruption. The 1915 eruption of Lassen Peak was the second most recent volcanic outburst in the contiguous 48 U.S. states (after the 1980 eruption of Mount St. Helens in Washington).

== Volcanic hazards ==
=== Direct eruption hazards ===
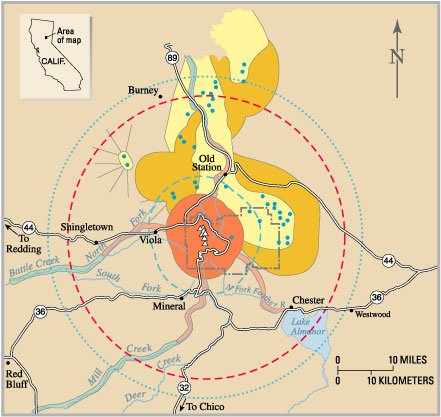
Volcano Hazards of the Lassen area

The Lassen area remains volcanically active. The most common volcanic activity over the last 50,000 years in the Lassen volcanic area consists of small to moderate-sized eruptions that produce basaltic lava flows and localized ash falls. These eruptions typically last a few months to a year, but may continue for several years. They can cover more than 1 sq mi (2.6 km^{2}) with lava flows, build cinder cones as high as 1,000 ft (300 m), and blanket many square miles (square kilometers) with ash a few inches (several cm) to about three feet (one meter) deep. Because these eruptions are relatively nonviolent, they rarely cause human fatalities.

Dacite eruptions in the Lassen area typically begin with steam explosions caused by the interaction of rising magma with ground water. When dacite magma charged with volcanic gases reaches the surface, it erupts explosively, usually as a vertical column of gas and ash that can rise several miles into the atmosphere. Heavy fallback of hot ash and rock fragments from eruption columns may generate highly mobile pyroclastic flows that can rush several miles down a volcano's slopes and adjacent valleys. Fallout from the eruption column can blanket areas within a few miles (about 8 km) of the vent with a thick layer of pumice, and high-altitude winds may carry finer ash tens to hundreds of miles from the volcano, posing a hazard to flying aircraft, particularly those with jet engines.

The areas of highest hazard are those that could be affected by pyroclastic flows and lahars. These areas, including Hat Creek Valley, are those in the immediate vicinity and downhill from likely eruption sites. Fallout of ash will affect areas downwind at the time of an eruption. Within the hazard zones, relative hazard is gradational, decreasing away from the location of potential vents.

After an initial explosive eruption, extrusion of gas-depleted dacite magma commonly forms lava domes. Growing lava domes are inherently unstable, and collapse of their steep sides often generates pyroclastic flows of lava blocks and ash that can travel several miles. Such a sequence of events is recorded by the deposits related to the emplacement of Chaos Crags domes between 1,100 and 1,000 years ago.

Interaction of hot pyroclastic flows with snow and ice can generate highly mobile flows of mud and debris (called lahars) that may rush down valleys leading away from a volcano. Because of this, active volcanoes that have a significant snow and ice cover can be particularly dangerous. The lahars that threatened residents of the Lassen area in May 1915 were generated by relatively small eruptions of Lassen Peak. Nonetheless, they traveled down creek beds as far as 12 mi (19 km) and released floods that affected valleys for 30 mi (48 km) downstream.

=== Non-eruption hazards ===
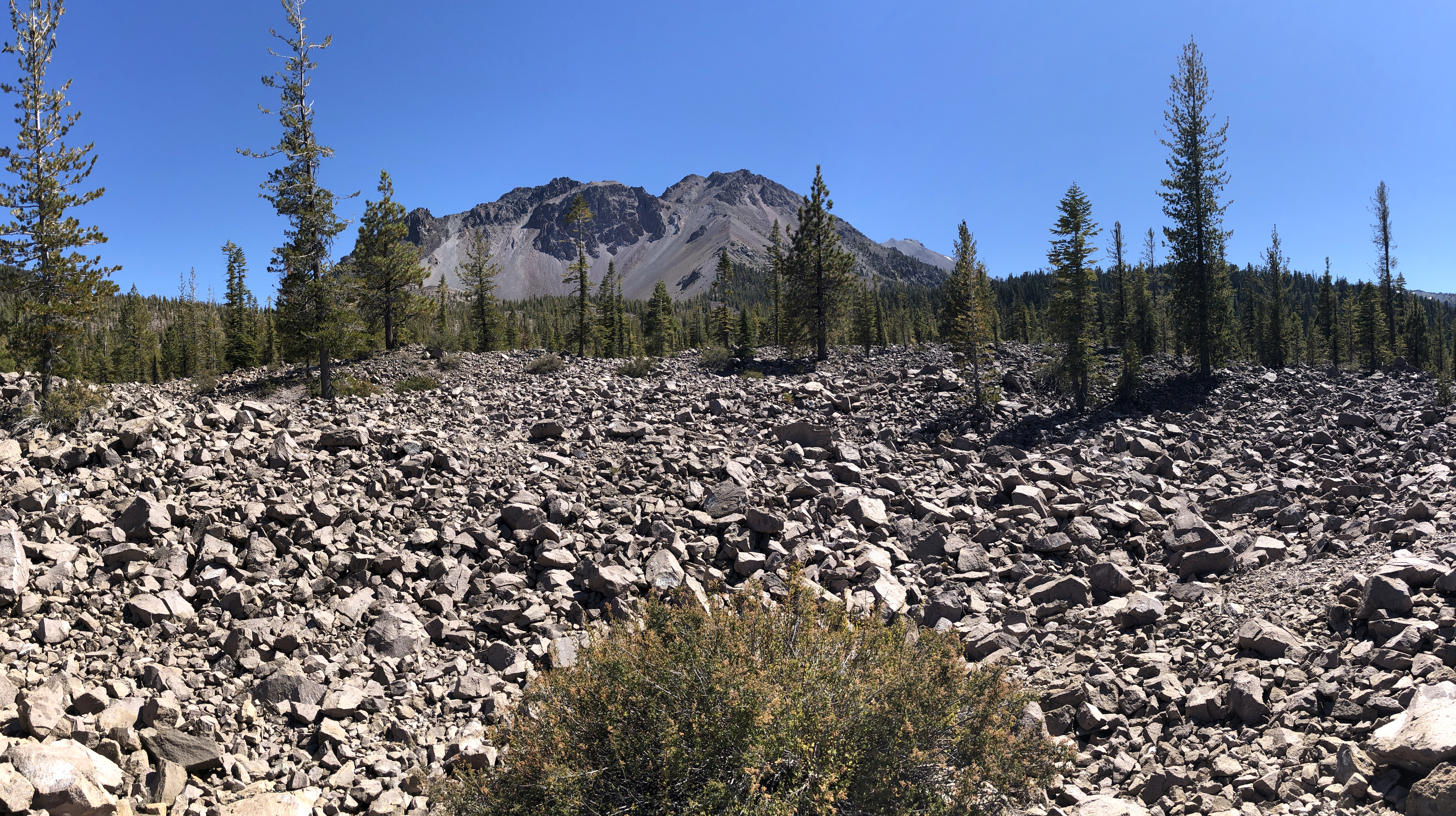
Avalanche deposit (foreground) at Jumble Chaos derived from the Jumble Crags escarpment (background)

Additional volcano hazards at Lassen are rockfalls and landslides not directly related to eruptions. Recently erupted volcanic domes are unstable and can collapse, generating small to large rockfalls. Approximately 350 years ago, collapse of one of the Chaos Crags domes generated huge rockfalls, creating an area now called the Chaos Jumbles. The first and largest of these traveled 4 mi (6.4 km) downslope and was able to climb 400 feet (120 m) up the side of Table Mountain. The trigger for the rockfall is unknown, but was most likely a large earthquake. Normal weathering also weakens fractured volcanic rock and contributes to small rockfalls. In the summer of 1994, a rockfall of 13,000 cu yd (9,900 m^{3}) occurred on the northeastern flank of Lassen Peak. During periods of extreme rainfall or snow melt, mudflows are sometimes generated by mobilization of loose volcanic debris and soil on the slopes of volcanoes.

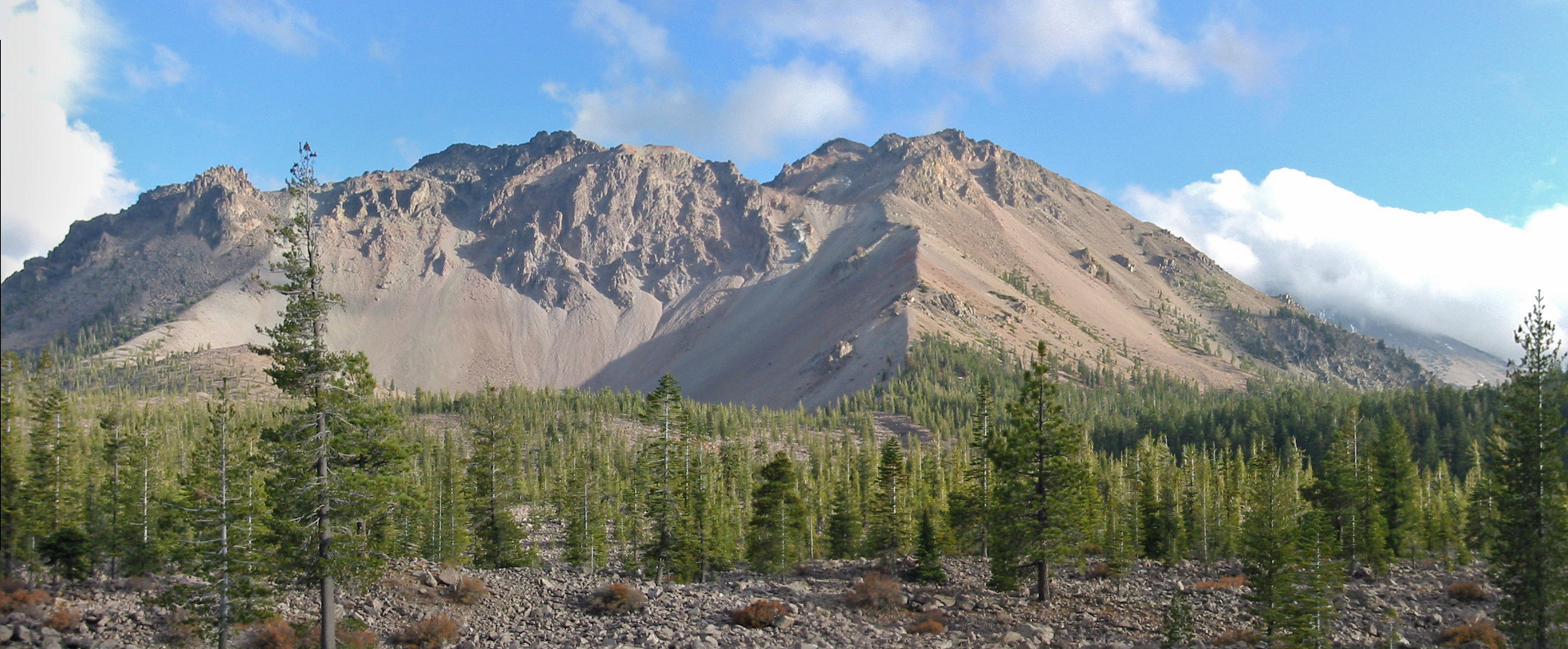
Fear of rockslides from Chaos Crags prompted the closure of the Visitor Center at nearby Manzanita Lake.

The only current visible activity in the Lassen volcanic area is from the various geothermal areas in Lassen Volcanic National Park; boiling hot springs, bubbling mud pots and fuming fumaroles. Most of these features lie in or are closely adjacent to Mount Tehama's caldera. In each thermal area, the highest temperature of water generally is close to the boiling temperature at the altitude of the particular spring or fumarole 198 °F (92 °C) at Bumpass Hell and 191 °F (88 °C) on the northwest flanks of Lassen Peak.

The hottest and most vigorous hydrothermal features in the Lassen volcanic area are at Bumpass Hell, which marks the principal area of upflow and steam discharge from the Lassen hydrothermal system. A prominent steam plume marks the site of Big Boiler, the largest fumarole in the park. The temperature of the high-velocity steam jetting from it has been measured as high as 322 °F (161 °C). A thin crust of material often covers these boiling hot features, making them a serious burn hazard to anyone walking off trail. The waters of the features are typically acidic and, even if cool enough, are not safe for bathing.

== Notes ==
=== References ===
- Alt, David D.; Hyndman, Donald W. (1986). Roadside Geology of Northern California. Missoula, Montana: Mountain Press Publishing Company. ISBN 0-87842-055-X.
- Clynne, M.A.; Muffler, L.J.P. Geologic map of Lassen Volcanic National Park and vicinity, California: U.S. Geological Survey Scientific Investigations Map 2899, scale 1:50,000 (Report).
- Germa, Aurelie; Perry, Chris; Quidelleur, Xavier; Calvert, Andrew; Clynne, Michael; Connor, Charles B.; Connor, Laura J.; Malservisi, Rocco; Charbonnier, Sylvain (June 7, 2019). "Temporal relationship between the Lassen volcanic center and mafic regional volcanism". Bulletin of Volcanology. 81 (7): 38. Bibcode:2019BVol...81...38G. doi:10.1007/s00445-019-1296-7. ISSN 1432-0819. S2CID 195240340. Archived from the original on February 4, 2022.
- Harris, Ann G.; Tuttle, Esther; Tuttle, Sherwood D. (1997). Geology of National Parks (5th ed.). Iowa: Kendall/Hunt Publishing. ISBN 0-7872-5353-7.
- Harris, Ann G.; Tuttle, Esther; Tuttle, Sherwood D. (2004). Geology of National Parks (6th ed.). Iowa: Kendall/Hunt Publishing. ISBN 0-7872-9971-5.
- Harris, Stephen L. (2001). Fire Mountains of the West: The Cascade and Mono Lake Volcanoes. Missoula, Montana: Mountain Press Publishing Company. ISBN 0-87842-220-X.
- Kiver, Eugene P.; Harris, David V. (1999). Geology of U.S. Parklands (5th ed.). New York: John Wiley & Sons. ISBN 0-471-33218-6. Archived from the original on January 28, 2024.
