= Bumpass =

Bumpass may refer to:

== Geography ==
- Bumpass, Virginia, an unincorporated community primarily in Louisa County
- Bumpass Cove, the former name of Bumpus Cove, Tennessee, US
- Bumpass Mountain, in Lassen Volcanic National Park, California, US
- Bumpass Hell, one of the geothermal areas in Lassen Volcanic National Park, US

== People ==
- Frances Webb Bumpass (1819–1898), American newspaper publisher and educator
- John Bumpass Calhoun (1917–1995), an American ethnologist and behavioral researcher
- Kendall Vanhook Bumpass (1809–1885), an American miner
- Rodger Bumpass (born 1951), an American actor

== See also ==
- Bumpus (disambiguation)
- Bumpas-Troy House, North Carolina, US
- Dick Bumpas, American football coach and player
