= Dittmar Volcano =

Extinct stratovolcano in Shasta, Plumas counties, California

Highest point
- Elevation: 7,638 ft (2,328 m)
- Coordinates: 40°27′10″N 121°20′50″W

Geology
- Mountain type: Stratovolcano
- Last eruption: Pleistocene

Dittmar Volcano, located on the border of Shasta, Lassen, and Tehama counties in California, is an extinct stratovolcano in the Cascade Range.

== Geography ==
The Dittmar Volcano is located east of Mount Tehama, southeast of Lassen Peak, northeast of Mount Maidu and Mount Yana, northwest of Lake Almanor and Mount Harkness, and southwest of the Caribou volcanic field.

== Geology ==
Dittmar Volcano is one of the older volcanoes that surround the modern-day Lassen Peak. It does not have much of its original shape, but it has a smaller, more recent stratovolcano and shield volcano, Mount Harkness.
