= Snow Mountain (Shasta County, California) =

Extinct stratovolcano in Shasta County, California

Highest point
- Elevation: 6,814 ft (2,077 m)
- Coordinates: 40°45′48″N 121°47′50″W

Geology
- Mountain type: Stratovolcano
- Last eruption: Pleistocene

Snow Mountain, located in Shasta County, California, is an extinct stratovolcano in the Cascade Range.

== Geography ==
Snow Mountain is located northwest of Magee Peak and Latour Butte, southwest of Burney Mountain, west of Freaner Peak, northeast of Redding, California, east of Shasta Lake, and southeast of Mount Shasta.

== Geology ==
Snow Mountain is one of older stratovolcanoes that predates Lassen Peak, one of the current volcanoes in the area. Snow Mountain has been eroded, and along with two other peaks, Green Mountain and Clover Mountain, they make up the stratovolcano.
