= Latour Butte =

Extinct volcano in Shasta County, California

Highest point
- Elevation: 6,739 ft (2,054 m)
- Coordinates: 40°36′28″N 121°42′32″W

Geology
- Mountain type: Volcanic cone
- Last eruption: Pleistocene

Latour Butte, located in Shasta County, California, is an extinct lava cone in the Cascade Range.

== Geography ==
Latour Butte is located northwest of Table Mountain, Chaos Crags, and Lassen Peak, southwest of Magee Peak, southeast of Snow Mountain, and east of Redding, California.

== Geology ==
Latour Butte is one of the volcanic centers that erupted before Lassen Peak formed. It was among the first to erupt, and it is a lava cone, unlike most of the other old volcanic centers, which are stratovolcanoes.
