= Bumpass Mountain =

Mountain in California, U.S.

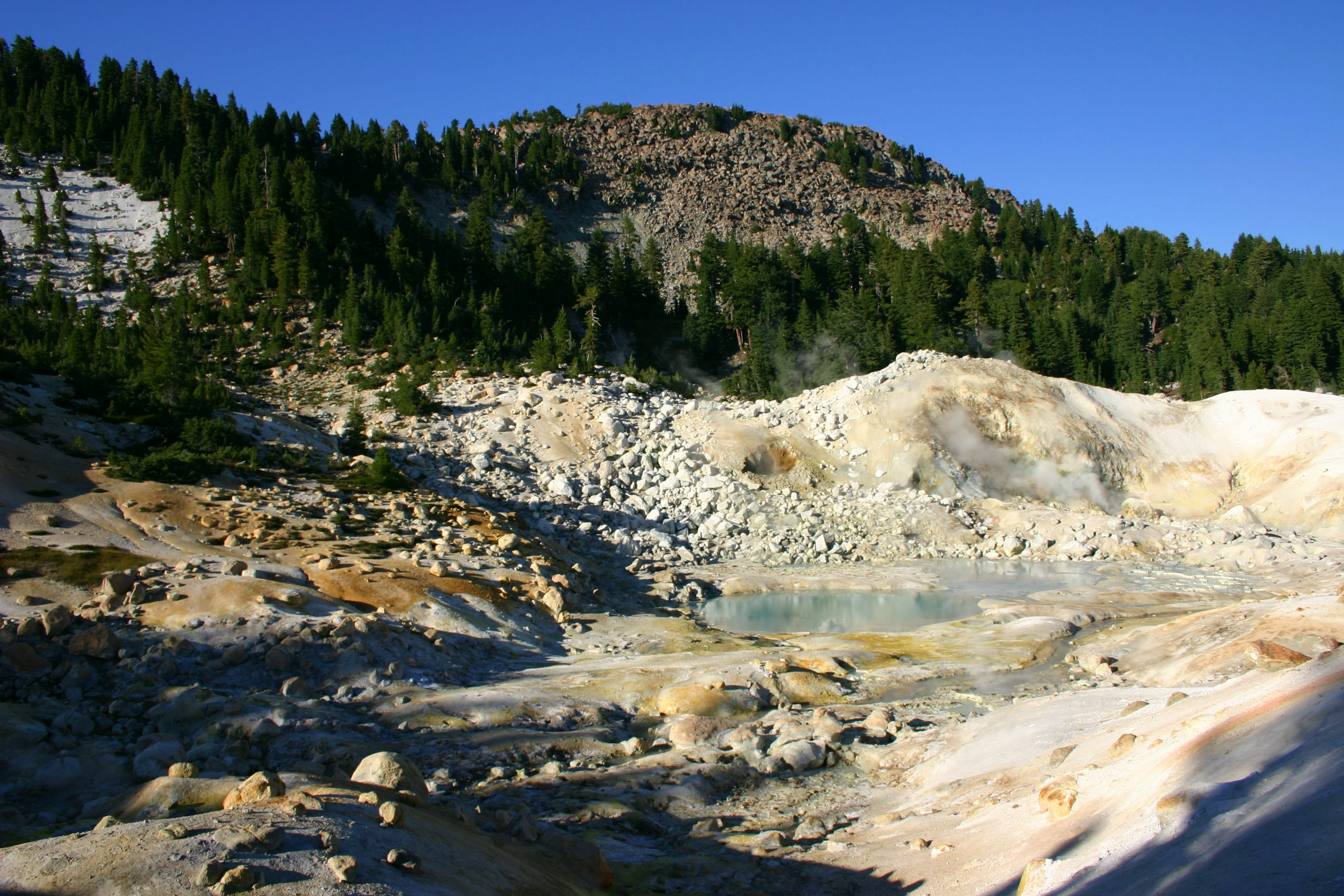
- Bumpass Mountain with Bumpass Hell in the foreground

Highest point
- Elevation: 8,757 ft (2,669 m) NAVD 88
- Coordinates: 40°27′41″N 121°29′56″W

Geography
- Location: Lassen Volcanic National Park, Shasta County, California, U.S.
- Parent range: Cascades
- Topo map: USGS Reading Peak

Geology
- Mountain type: Lava dome

Bumpass Mountain is a mountain located south of Lassen Peak in Lassen Volcanic National Park, California. It rises to an elevation of 8,753 feet (2,668 m) near Bumpass Hell and Lake Helen. The mountain receives heavy snowfall during the winter, which can lead to deep snowpacks of over 300 inches (7.6 m) near the mountain.

Both the mountain and Bumpass Hell were named in honor of Kendall V. Bumpass, a hunter, guide and prospector in the area around Red Bluff, California, before 1870.
