= Table Mountain (Shasta County, California) =

Extinct stratovolcano in Shasta County, California

Highest point
- Elevation: 6,880 ft (2,100 m)
- Coordinates: 40°33′26″N 121°33′1″W

Geology
- Mountain type: Stratovolcano
- Last eruption: Pleistocene

Table Mountain, in Shasta County, California, is an extinct stratovolcano in the Cascade Range.

== Geography ==
Table Mountain is northwest of Chaos Crags and Lassen Peak, southeast of Red Lake Mountain, Red Mountain, Eskimo Hill, and Latour Butte, and west of Prospect Peak.

== Geology ==
Table Mountain is one of the old, extinct stratovolcanoes that predate Lassen Peak. It has a three flank vents, Red Lake Mountain, Red Mountain, and Eskimo Hill.
