= Bumpus =

Bumpus is both a surname and a given name. Notable people with the name include:

- Cornelius Bumpus (1945–2004), American musician
- Earl Bumpus (1914–1985), American baseball player
- Hermon Carey Bumpus (1862–1943), American college administrator
- Judith Bumpus (1939–2010), British radio producer
- Mary Bumpus, the real name of Frances Allitsen, English composer
- Michael Bumpus (born 1985), American football player
- Namandjé Bumpus, American pharmacologist
- Bumpus Jones (1870–1938), American baseball player

== Fictional characters ==
- The Bumpuses, unseen family in the book A Christmas Story
- Conroy Bumpus, a character in Sam & Max Hit the Road

== See also ==
- Bumpass (disambiguation)
- Bumpus Cove, Tennessee, US
- Bumpus Mills, Tennessee, US
- Bumpus Quarry, Maine, US
