= Burney Mountain =

Mountain in California, United States

- aap̓óóha (Achumawi)
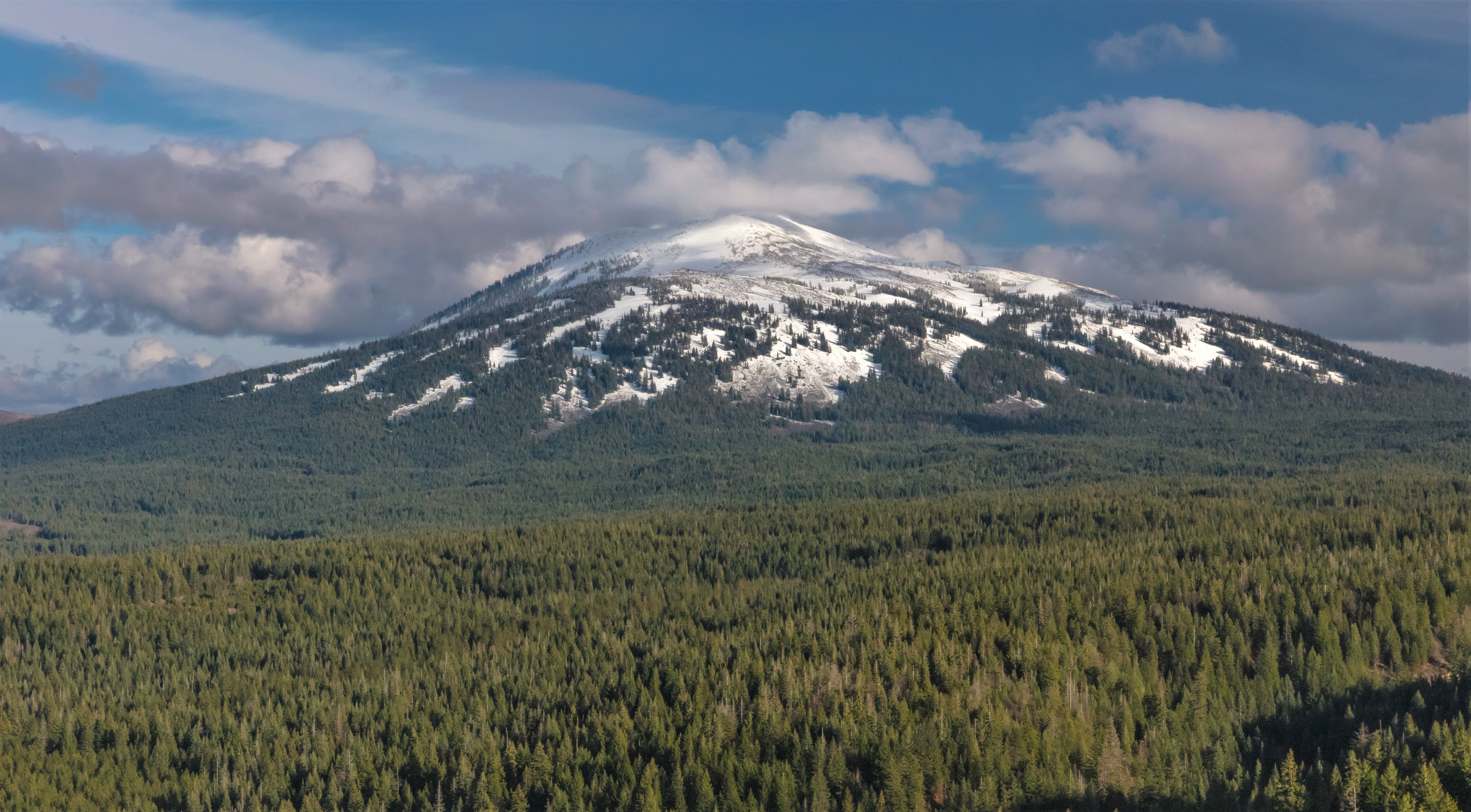
- Burney Mountain in March 2017

Highest point
- Elevation: 2,397 m (7,864 ft)
- Prominence: 873 m (2,864 ft)
- Coordinates: 40°48′23.59″N 121°37′39.98″W

Geography
- Location within California
- Location: Shasta County, California, U.S.
- Parent range: Cascade Range
- Topo map: USGS Burney Mountain West

Geology
- Mountain type: Lava dome complex

Burney Mountain is a lava dome complex located in the Cascade Range of eastern Shasta County, California, next to the slightly larger Crater Peak and slightly smaller Magee Peak. It stands at 2,397 m (7,854 ft) and is around 8.9 km (5.5 mi) south-southeast of Burney, California.

Burney Mountain last erupted about 230,000 years ago during the Pleistocene epoch. It is composed of two craters, which open to the east. Burney Mountain is the largest Quaternary dome in the Cascade Volcanic Arc, containing a volume of about 9 km^{3} (2.2 mi^{3}).

The eastern side of the mountain was burned in the Eiler Fire in 2014, ultimately destroying 21 structures and injuring 11 people, mostly in Hat Creek.
