= Kendall Vanhook Bumpass =

American pioneer

"[The] descent to Hell was easy." – Kendall Bumpass

Our guide [Mr. K.V. Bumpass,] after cautioning us to be careful where we stepped... broke through the crust and plunged his leg into the boiling mud beneath, which clinging to his limb burned him severely. If our guide had been a profane man I think he would have cursed a little; as it was, I think his silence was owing to his inability to do the subject justice...

— Red Bluff Independent, 1865

Kendall VanHook Bumpass (November 6, 1809 – 1885) was a cowboy and early settler, who, in 1865, broke through the surface of a scalding hot mudpot in an active geothermal area and consequently lost a leg by amputation. The geothermal area was later named "Bumpass Hell", and is today located in Lassen Volcanic National Park in California.
