= Mount Yana =

Extinct stratovolcano in Tehama, Plumas, and Butte counties in California

Highest point
- Elevation: 7,870 ft (2,400 m)
- Coordinates: 40°13′3″N 121°23′11″W

Geology
- Rock age: Pliocene
- Mountain type: Stratovolcano
- Last eruption: Pleistocene

Mount Yana, located on the border of Tehama, Plumas, and Butte counties of California, is an extinct stratovolcano located in the Cascade Range.

== Geography ==
Mount Yana is southeast of Mount Maidu and Mineral, California, southwest of Lake Almanor and Chester, California, and northeast of Chico, California.

== Geology ==
Mount Yana is the oldest of the volcanic centers that erupted before Lassen Peak and the other nearby lava domes formed. It is now eroded, and some of its more notable remnants include Butt Mountain, Ruffa Ridge, and Humboldt Peak.
