= Mount Tehama =

Eroded Andesitic stratovolcano in Northern California

Brokeoff Volcano
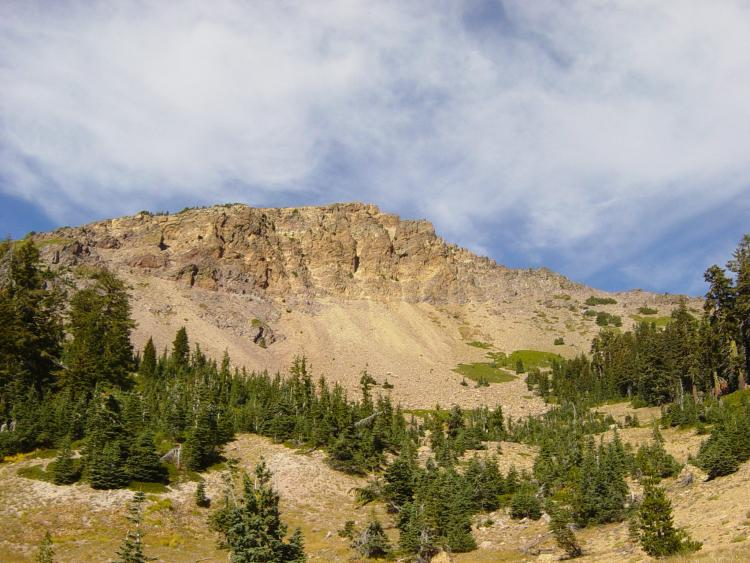
- Northeast face of Mount Tehama

Highest point
- Elevation: 9,239 ft (2,816 m) NAVD 88
- Prominence: 915 ft (279 m)
- Listing: California county high points 17th
- Coordinates: 40°26′44″N 121°33′34″W

Geography
- Location: Shasta / Tehama counties, California, U.S.
- Parent range: Cascade Range
- Topo map: USGS Lassen Peak

Geology
- Mountain type: Eroded stratovolcano
- Volcanic arc: Cascade Volcanic Arc

Climbing
- Easiest route: Hike

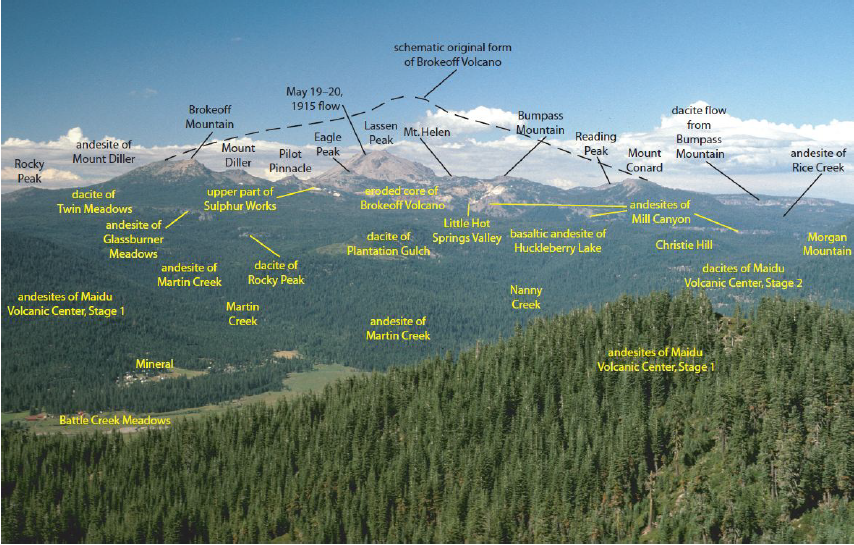
Former extent of Brokeoff Volcano

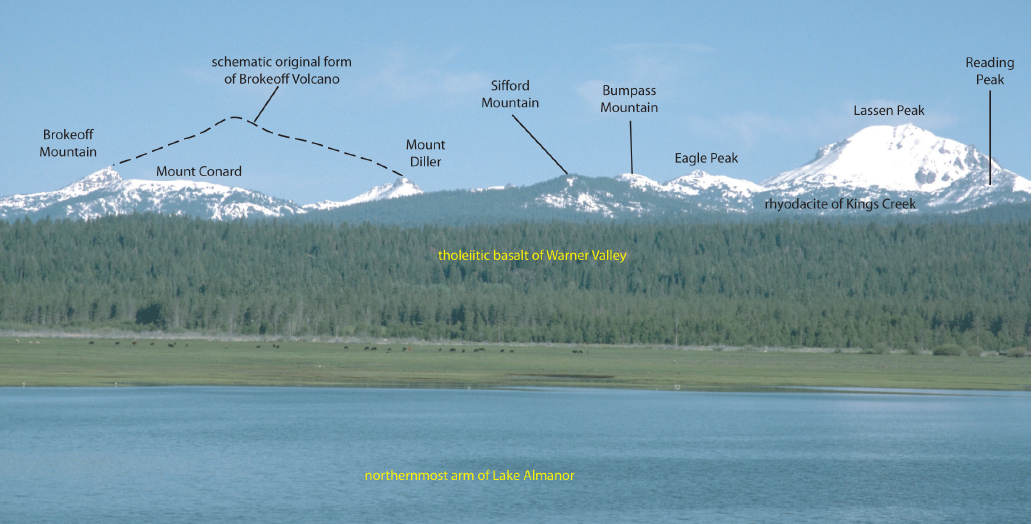
Former extent of Brokeoff Volcano

Mount Tehama (also called Brokeoff Volcano or Brokeoff Mountain) is an eroded extinct andesitic stratovolcano in the Cascade Volcanic Arc and the Cascade Range in Northern California. Part of the Lassen volcanic area, its tallest remnant, Brokeoff Mountain, is itself the second highest peak in Lassen Volcanic National Park and connects to the park's highest point, Lassen Peak. Located on the border of Tehama County and Shasta County, Brokeoff's peak is the highest point in the former. The hikers that summit this mountain each year are treated to "exceptional" views of Lassen Peak, the Central Valley of California, and many of the park's other features. On clear days, Mount Shasta can also be seen in the distance.

Brokeoff Volcano was active from 590,000 to 387,000 years ago, during which period it erupted numerous flows with compositions ranging from basaltic andesite to dacite. At its peak, Brokeoff Volcano reached an estimated height of 3,350 metres (10,990 ft) and had a basal circumference of approximately 12 kilometres (7.5 mi). At approximately 313,000 years ago volcanism began shifting to the northeast of Brokeoff Volcano, with volcanism currently focused around the modern Lassen Peak. Following the end of volcanism at Brokeoff Volcano, cooling magma beneath the surface continued to drive hot, highly reactive hydrothermal fluids circulating near the central vent of the volcano. These hydrothermal fluids chemically weathered the volcanic rocks near the central vent, making them particularly susceptible to physical erosion. Glaciers and streams were able to rapidly erode the hydrothermally altered rocks near the central vent, creating the deep Mill Canyon and exposing deep into the core of the ancient volcano.

Many of the lava flows along the flanks of Brokeoff Volcano were not as extensively chemically weathered, resulting in the flanks of much of the volcano being preserved. Remnants of the flanks of Brokeoff Volcano include Brokeoff Mountain, Mount Conard, Pilot Pinnacle, Mount Diller, and Diamond Peak.

== History ==
The area near Lassen Peak became a haven for new settlers throughout the 1800s. Wagon trains followed winding trails on the Nobles Emigrant Trail which cut through the Lassen Peak vicinity near Sacramento Valley. One of the main landmarks along this trail was a volcano. Called Lassen Peak after Peter Lassen, a prominent blacksmith and guide who escorted California settlers, the volcano and the area around it were given merit for their gripping volcanic phenomena, which included lava beds and extinct volcanic cones. In May 1907, Lassen Peak was declared a national monument by President Theodore Roosevelt to protect the area for "future generations to study and enjoy". Roosevelt had been told that the area was actually extinct in terms of eruptive activity. Despite assurance from Native Americans in the area that the mountain was indeed active, settlers continued to think that Lassen Peak was extinct and "dead" and so continued to settle nearby. The natives continued to declare that "one day the mountain would blow itself to pieces". In May 1914, almost exactly seven years later, the volcano began a large explosive eruption sequence. More than a hundred eruptions of varying size took place over the next seven years, attracting national interest and the designation of national park in 1916.

== Geography and geology ==
The state of California is located on the Pacific Ring of Fire, an area of highly active tectonic activity that includes seismicity and volcanism. Brokeoff and the other volcanoes near Lassen Peak were produced by subduction of the oceanic Juan de Fuca Plate under the North American Plate.

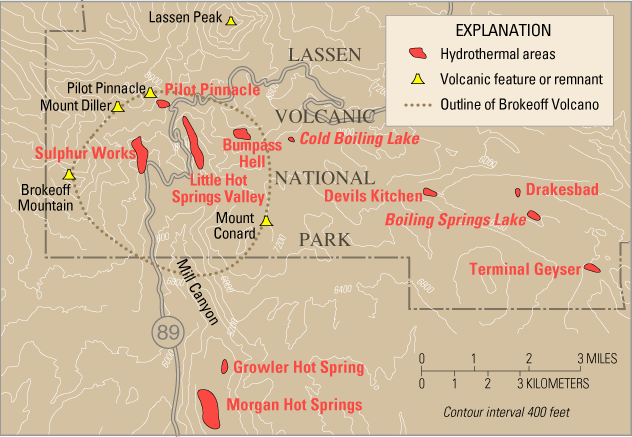
Extent of Brokeoff Volcano shown by outline

Brokeoff Volcano represents the Pleistocene component of the Lassen volcanic complex, an area of active volcanism for more than three million years. It formed during a period of eruptive activity approximately 600,000 years ago on a series of faults; the largest of these eruptions was about 50 times as powerful as the 1980 eruption of Mount St. Helens. During the Pleistocene, constantly renewed lava of andesite flowed from the central vent of the volcano. The eruption of overlapping andesitic lava flows accumulated to build the volcano. By the time it reached its peak size, the volcano was immense, measuring at its base between 11 mi (18 km) and 15 mi (24 km) wide and more than 11,000 ft (3,353 m) tall. Activity at Brokeoff lasted for approximately 200,000 years. Eruptions varied from ejection of pyroclastic material to andesitic lava flows built primarily of feldspar, pyroxene, and olivine.

Soon after the formation of Brokeoff, other, smaller volcanoes began to form. Shield volcanoes like Raker Peak, Red Mountain, Prospect Peak, and Mount Harkness appeared. At this point, the Pleistocene was coming to an end. One additional and final vent formed on the northeastern flank of the volcano, erupting glassy dacitic flows. Over time, the volcano became dilapidated from extensive erosion and hydrothermal alteration, and was eroded by creeks and glaciers. Later activity built more than thirty other cones known as the Lassen Domes. Today the most active volcano in the area is Lassen Peak. Other smaller craters younger than 50,000 years are also active.

Brokeoff's remains are exposed to the southwest Mount Lassen in Shasta County, California. Sulphur Works, an area known for its sharp, putrid scent, is thought to be the center of the ancient volcano. The central vent of Brokeoff Volcano was located near modern Diamond Peak.

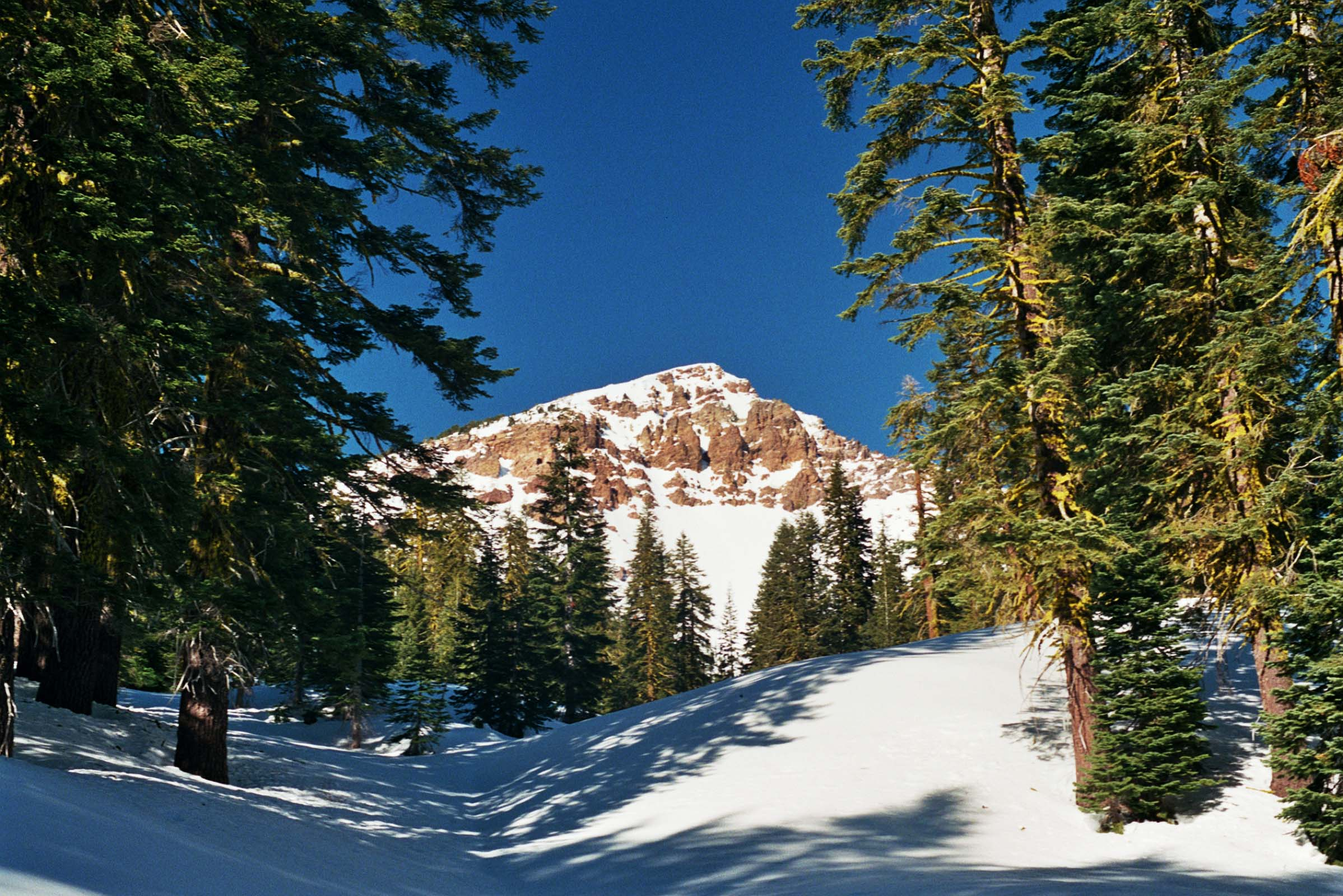
Brokeoff Mountain in winter.

After volcanism at Brokeoff ended, magmatism became more silicic and began migrating toward Lassen Peak's northern flank. The last 400,000 years have seen at least three known flows, parts of which are still on Raker Peak and Mount Conard. A subsequent explosive eruption ejected 12 cu mi (50 km^{3}) of material and created a large crater, which was soon covered by lava. Twelve lava domes were built throughout the area and the next period of eruptive activity began. Spanning 50,000 years it ejected 3.5 cu mi (15 km^{3}) to 6 cu mi (25 km^{3}) of material and was followed by a third period. At least twelve periods of activity have taken place since Brokeoff formed, consisting of activity including pyroclastic flows, pasty lavas, and additional lava domes. Among the vents built by this activity is Lassen Peak.

== Flora and fauna ==
Near the trailhead at lower elevations, alder thickets are present, as well as incense cedar, red firs, and western white pine. At higher elevations, groups of mountain hemlock and lupines prevail. Eagles and hawks can be frequently noted on high crags, and squirrels and pika live about the mountain.

== Recreation ==
Hiking is especially popular on the mountain during summer. The mountain trail lasts between four and six hours, spans 7.4 mi (12 km), and offers "exceptional" views of Mount Diller, Lassen Peak, Chaos Crags, and Mount Conard.

Due to the characteristically intermittent eruptions of active volcanoes such as Lassen Peak, there is some threat from the volcanoes of the LVNP. Dacitic explosive eruptions have taken place within the last 50,000 years at Lassen Peak, Chaos Crags, and Sunflower Flat, and effusive eruptions of basalt have occurred at Tumble Buttes, Hat Mountain, and Prospect Peak. Pyroclastic flows and lahars could easily occur near glaciated areas and in river valleys like Hat Creek Valley. In addition to the volcanic hazards that could possibly occur, one volcano did erupt in the 20th century in LVNP: (Lassen Peak). Lassen's eruptions (1914–21, though most activity occurred between 1914 and 1917) were very small compared to the 1980 eruption of Mount St. Helens.

== See also ==
- List of highest points in California by county
