= Mount Maidu =

Extinct stratovolcano in the Lassen area

Highest point
- Elevation: 6,965 ft (2,123 m)
- Coordinates: 40°17′56″N 121°37′1″W

Geology
- Mountain type: Stratovolcano
- Last eruption: Pleistocene

Mount Maidu, located in Tehama County, California, is an extinct stratovolcano south of the Lassen volcanic center. It has Mineral, California, a small community, in its caldera.

== Geography ==
Mount Maidu is located southwest of Mount Tehama, northwest of Lake Almanor, and north of Chico, California.

== Geology ==
Mount Maidu is one of the several stratovolcanoes that surround the modern Lassen Peak. It has rhyolite lava domes on its northern flank.
