= Geothermal areas in Lassen Volcanic National Park =

Hotsprings and fumaroles in California

Coordinates: 40.4581°N 121.5018°W

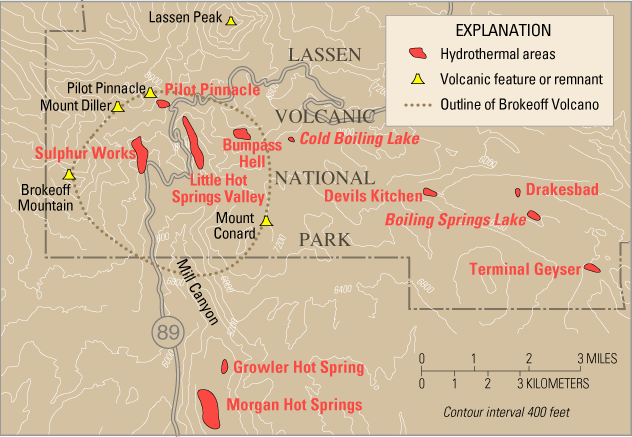
Map of the geothermal areas

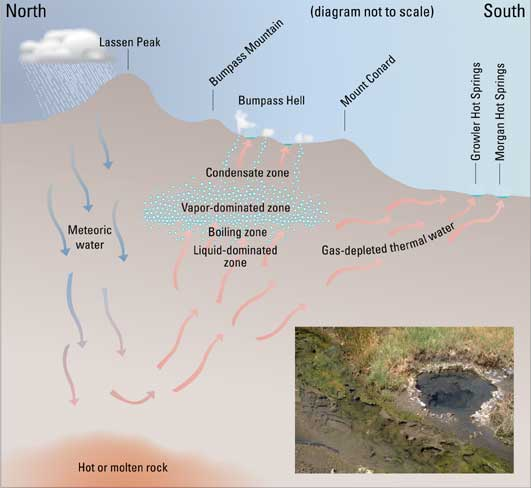
Lassen hydrothermal system

The geothermal areas in Lassen Volcanic National Park include several groups of hot springs and fumaroles, as remnants of former volcanic activity, exist in Lassen Volcanic National Park in northeastern California. Most of these lie in or are closely adjacent to Mount Tehama's caldera. Bumpass Hell is the most spectacular of these, but others of importance are Sulphur Works, Little Hot Springs Valley, Boiling Springs Lake and Devil's Kitchen. In each thermal area, the highest temperature of water generally is close to the boiling temperature at the altitude of the particular spring or fumarole — 198 °F (92 °C) at Bumpass Hell and 191 °F (88 °C) on the northwest flanks of Lassen Peak. Temperatures as high as 230 °F (110 °C) have been recorded in the park.

Spring activity varies with water supply. Abundant water results in clear springs during early summer, but as the season progresses and the water supply decreases, springs change successively to turbid, warm pools, spattering mudpots, and finally steaming fumaroles. There are no true geysers within Lassen Volcanic National Park.

Gases from hot springs are composed mostly of steam and carbon dioxide, with minor amounts of other gases. These react with the rocks around the springs to ultimately form opal if temperature and acidity are high, or kaolin if they are low. Deposits of sulfur, pyrite, quartz and other substances are also found around the springs and in their runoff channels.

Solfataric alteration within the caldera of Mount Tehama covers about five square miles (13 km^{2}), much more extensive than the present hot springs basins. indicative of its former extent and suggestive of its waning activity. It is the altered materials in the caldera that yielded most readily to the forces of erosion. Diamond Peak is a body of unaltered rock that still remains, because it is more resistant.

== Sulphur Works and Little Hot Springs Valley ==
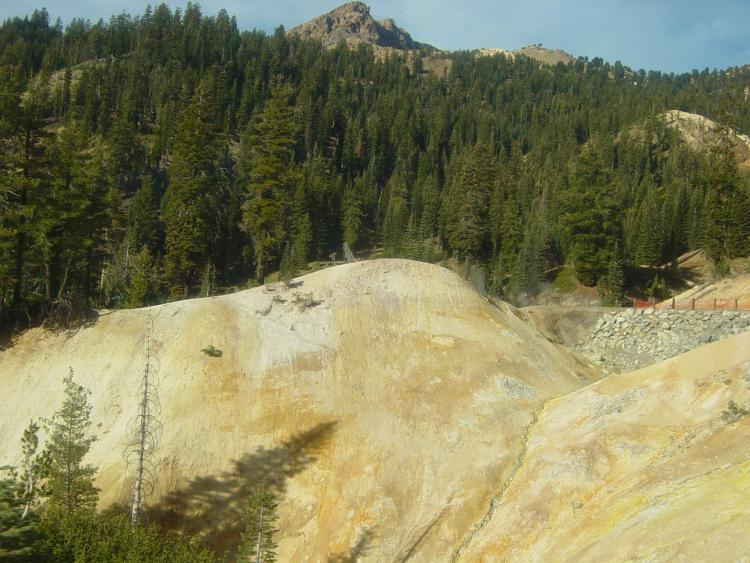
Sulphur Works

Boiling mudpot, Sulphur Works

As in many hydrothermally active areas, the rocks at Sulphur Works and Little Hot Springs Valley in Lassen Volcanic National Park have been chemically altered into bright-colored clays. Sulfurous acid and sulfuric acid have broken down hard, gray-green andesite lavas into red, yellow and buff clays and iron oxides. Many visitors pass through Sulphur Works on their way north on State Route 89 and sense the rotten-egg smell (hydrogen sulfide) when they pass by a hot vent to the east of the road. Sulphur Works is said to be the volcanic center of the ancestral Mount Tehama.

== Bumpass Hell ==
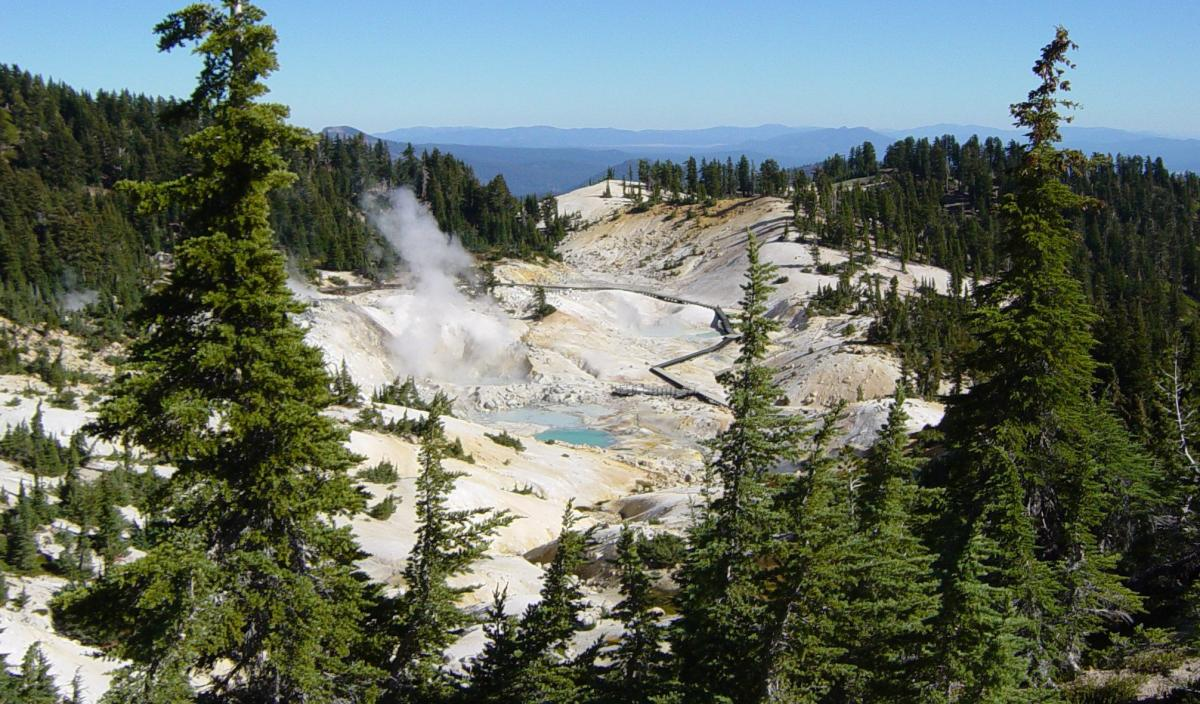
Bumpass Hell

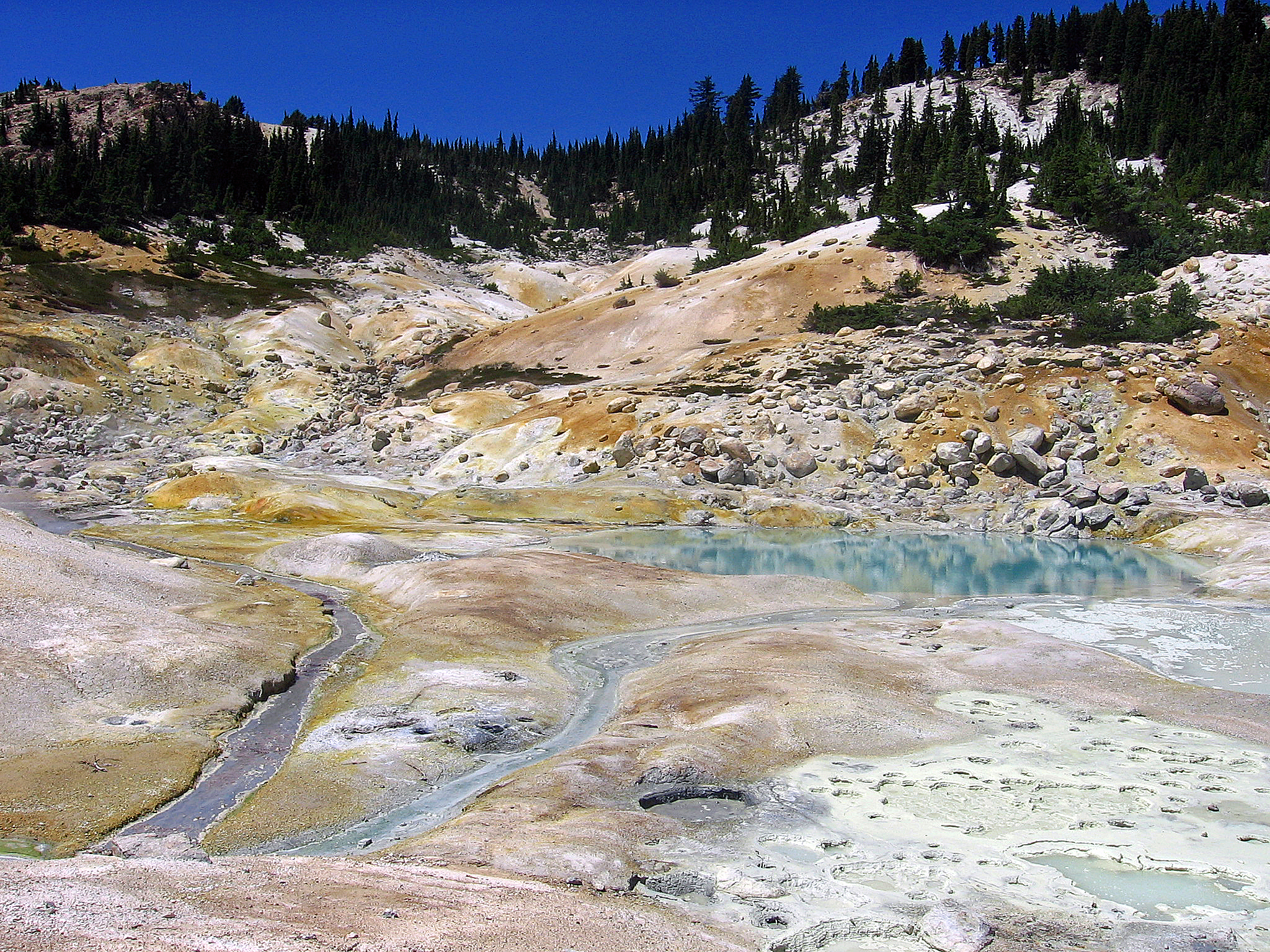
Boiling Pools Inside Bumpass Hell

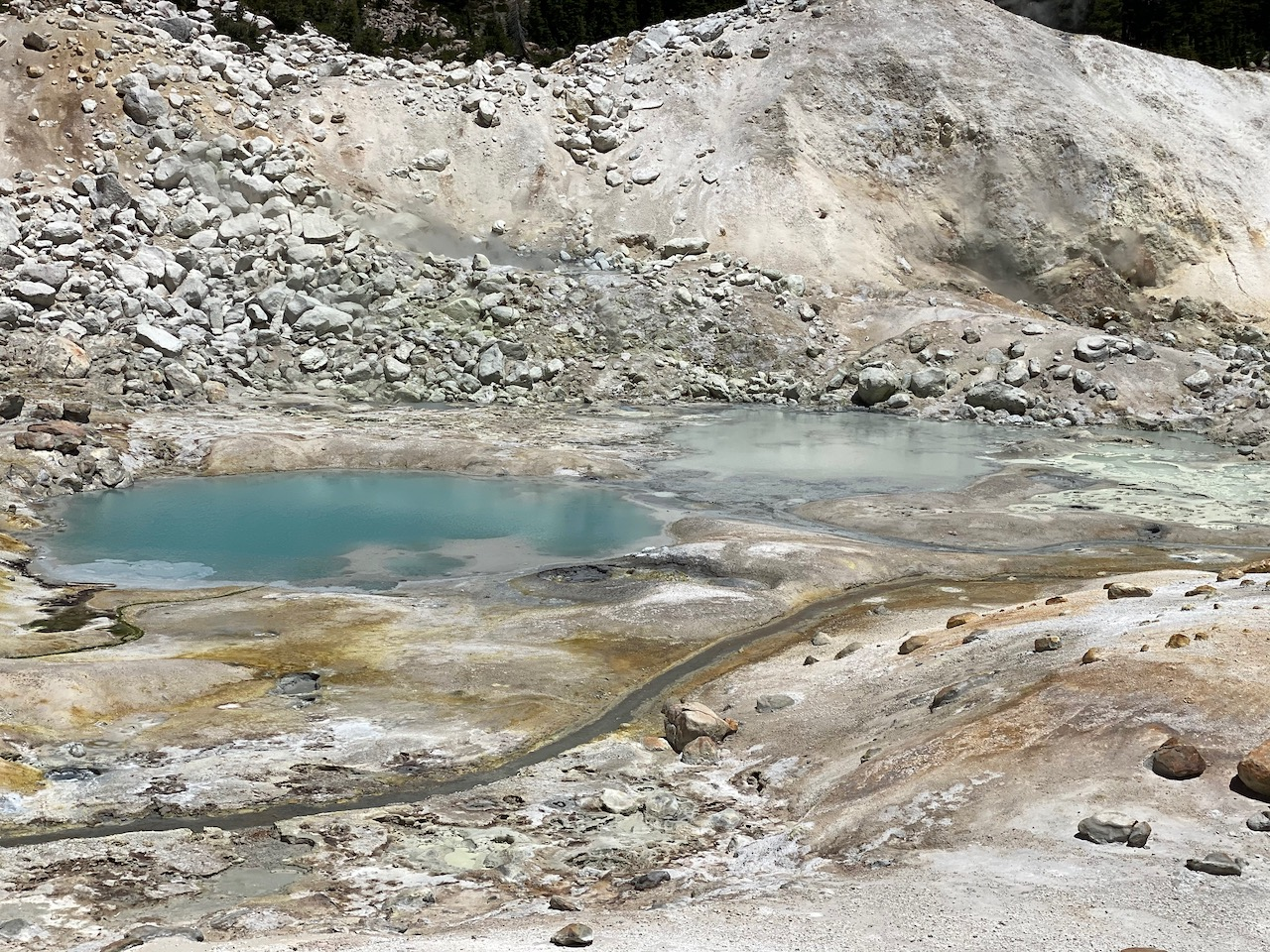
Photo of several hot springs at Bumpass Hell from the perspective of the boardwalk.

Near Little Hot Springs Valley is Bumpass Hell, a hydrothermally altered geothermal area that spans 16 acres (6.5 ha) and has hot springs, fumaroles, and boiling mudpots. As part of Mount Tehama's main vent, Bumpass Hell is the result of fissures that tap the volcanic heat, thought to be a cooling mass of andesite, perhaps three miles (5 km) below the surface.

It is named after Kendall Vanhook Bumpass, a cowboy and early settler who worked in the Lassen Peak area in the 1860s. Bumpass discovered the geothermal feature and was named on a mining claim for the area. In 1865 the editor of the Red Bluff Independent newspaper took a trip with Bumpass to see the locale. During this trip Bumpass broke through a thin crust above a scalding hot mudpot; his leg was badly scalded and eventually had to be amputated. The area was named in his honor.

== Devils Kitchen ==
About 7 mi (11 km) southeast of Lassen Peak is Devils Kitchen. In this geothermal area the hot springs are so acidic that they have eaten pits and holes in the bedrock.

== Terminal Geyser ==
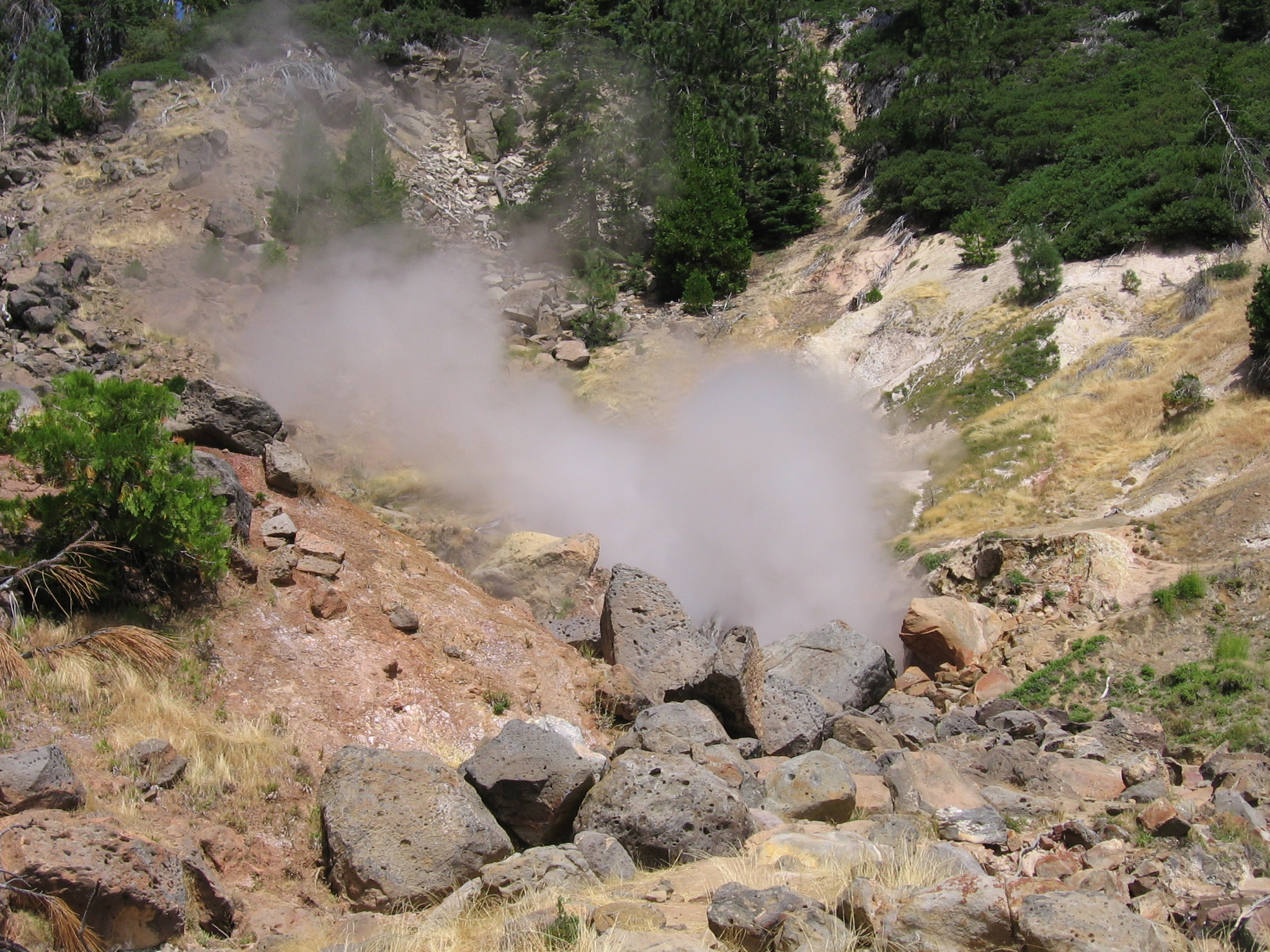
Terminal Geyser

Located in the southeast corner of the park, Terminal Geyser is not actually a geyser, but rather a cold stream flowing over a steam vent. This is about 100 feet (30 m) from the site of a geothermal boring operation that took place in 1962 and 1978. The 4,008-foot (1,222 m) well is now plugged and abandoned.

== Boiling Springs Lake ==
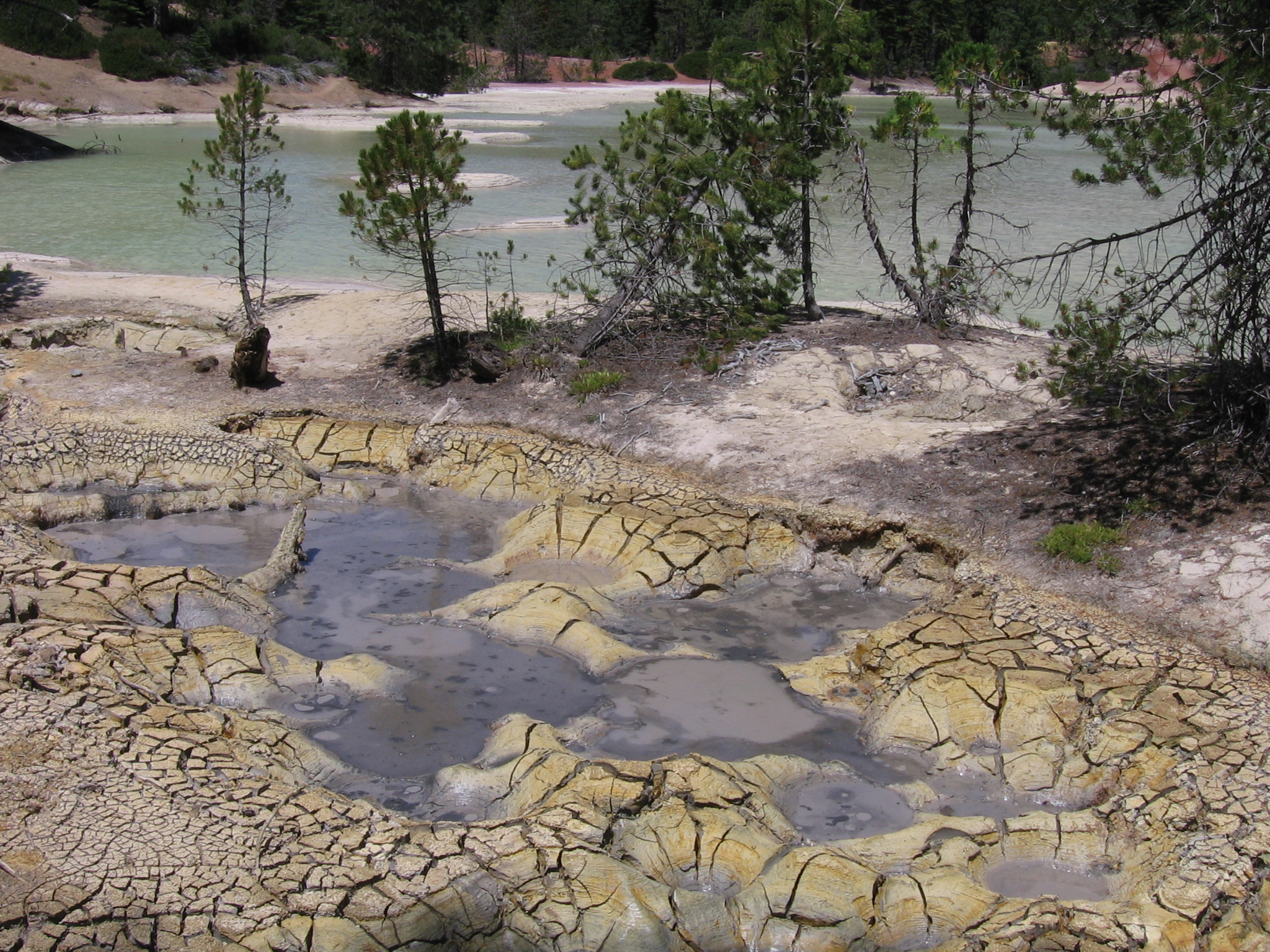
Boiling Springs Lake is acidic and very hot. The first hybrid virus was discovered here in 2012. Genetic hybrids are called "chimera", after mythological creatures like the Griffin or winged horse.

Just northwest of Terminal Geyser, large, warm-water Boiling Springs Lake has many hot springs, mudpots, and fumaroles along its west shore. Unlike the more heavily visited areas of the park, this area is not developed with boardwalks or signs and offers a chance to view thermal features in a more natural setting.

In 2012, scientists studying the viruses in Boiling Springs Lake found the first known case of a natural hybrid or "chimera" virus, apparently made of two very different groups of viruses that recombined into a single organism. They named this "mythological beast of a virus" the "Boiling Springs Lake RNA−DNA Hybrid Virus" or "BSL−RDHV". The study showed there is still much to learn about how viruses can evolve. Other types of viral hybrids have since been found elsewhere, and are called the CHIV group ("chimeric viruses").

== See also ==
- Geology of the Lassen volcanic area
- Geothermal areas of Yellowstone
- Lassen Peak
- Lassen Volcanic National Park
- Volcanic Legacy Scenic Byway
