= Mudpot =

Hot spring, or fumarole, with limited water

Mudpot in Lassen Volcanic National Park

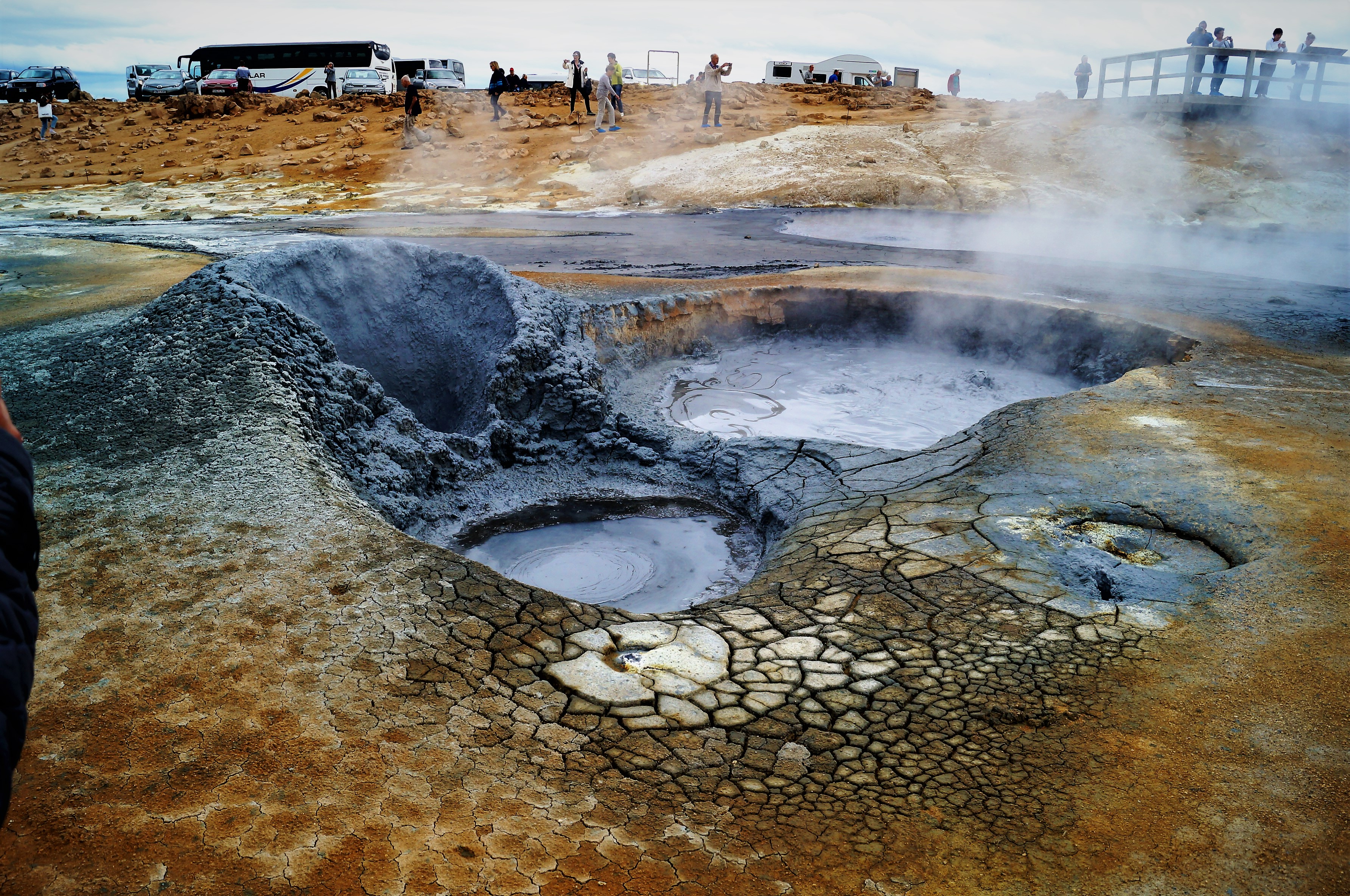
Mudpots lined up above a volcanic fissure at Hverarönd, Iceland

A mudpot, or mud pool, is a type of acidic hot spring, or fumarole, with limited water. It usually takes the form of a pool of bubbling mud, as a result of the acid and microorganisms decomposing surrounding rock into clay and mud.

== Description ==
The mud of a mudpot takes the form of a viscous, often bubbling, slurry. As the boiling mud is often squirted over the brims of the mudpot, a form resembling a mini-volcano of mud starts to build up, sometimes reaching heights of 1 to 1.5 m (3 1/2 to 5 ft). Although mudpots are often called "mud volcanoes", true mud volcanoes are very different in nature. The mud of a mudpot is generally of white to greyish color, but is sometimes stained with reddish or pink spots from iron compounds. When the slurry is particularly colorful, the feature may be referred to as a paint pot.

== Geology ==
Mudpots form in high-temperature geothermal areas where water supply is short. The little water that is available rises to the surface at a spot where the soil is rich in volcanic ash, clay, and other fine particulates. The thickness of the mud usually changes along with seasonal changes in the water table.

== Notable sites ==
The geothermal areas of Yellowstone National Park contain several notable examples of both mudpots and paint pots, as do some areas of Azerbaijan, Iceland, New Zealand and Nicaragua.

Several locations in and around the Salton Sea in California are also home to active mudpots, including the moving Niland Geyser. In the case of Niland Geyser, its name is somewhat of a misnomer, as the release of carbon dioxide by seismic activity from the nearby San Andreas Fault is responsible for its behaviour, rather than through geothermal activity. The fluid contained within it is near ambient atmospheric temperature, rather than boiling, measuring around 27 °C (80 °F).

== Photo gallery ==
A large boiling mudpot in the parking area of West Thumb Geyser Basin in Yellowstone

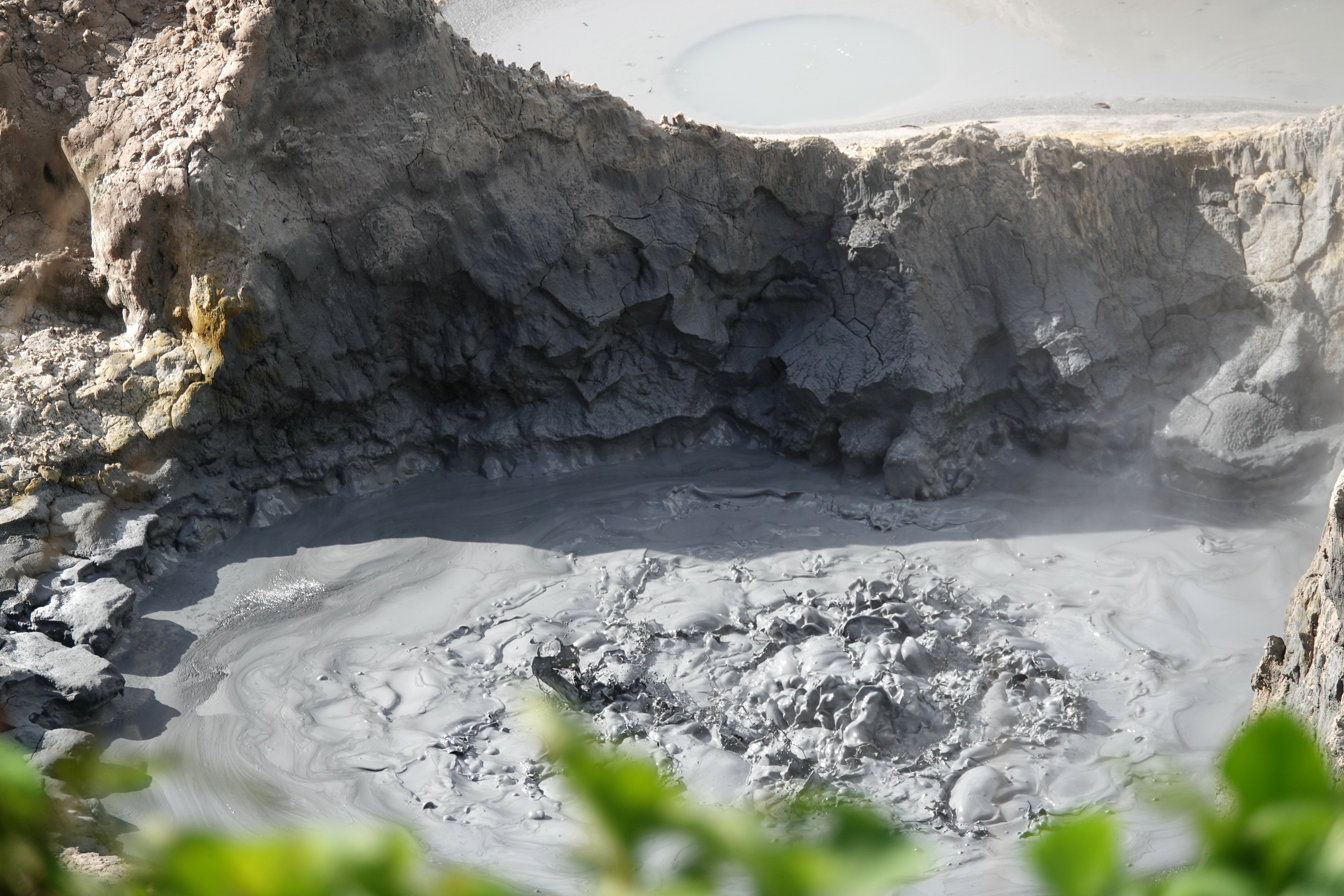
Mudpot at Sulphur Springs, Saint Lucia

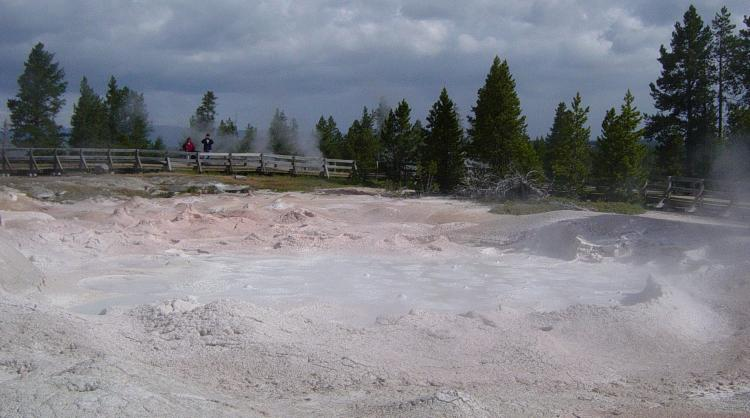
Fountain Paint Pots, Yellowstone National Park

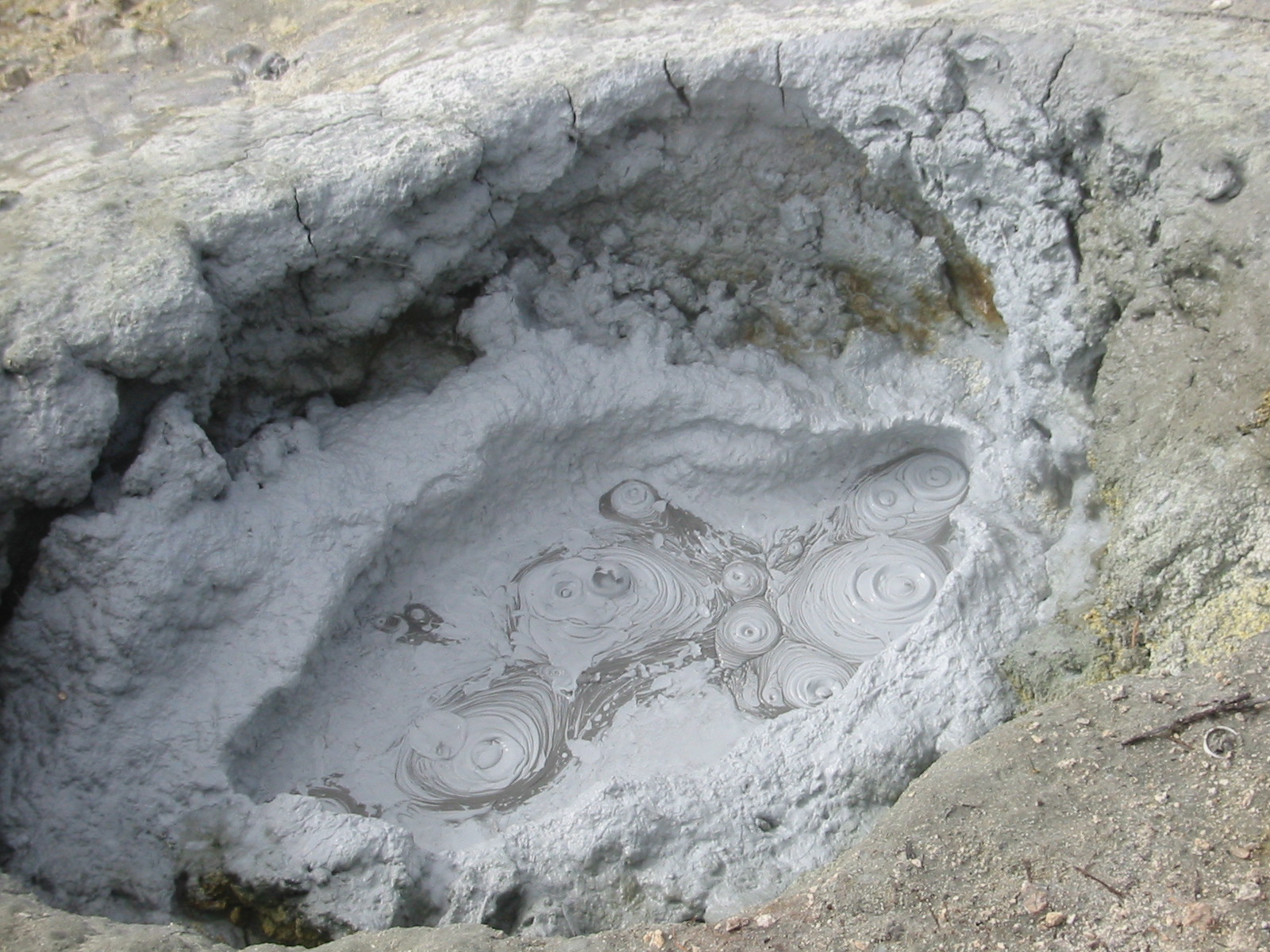
Mudpot in Bumpass Hell, Lassen Volcanic National Park

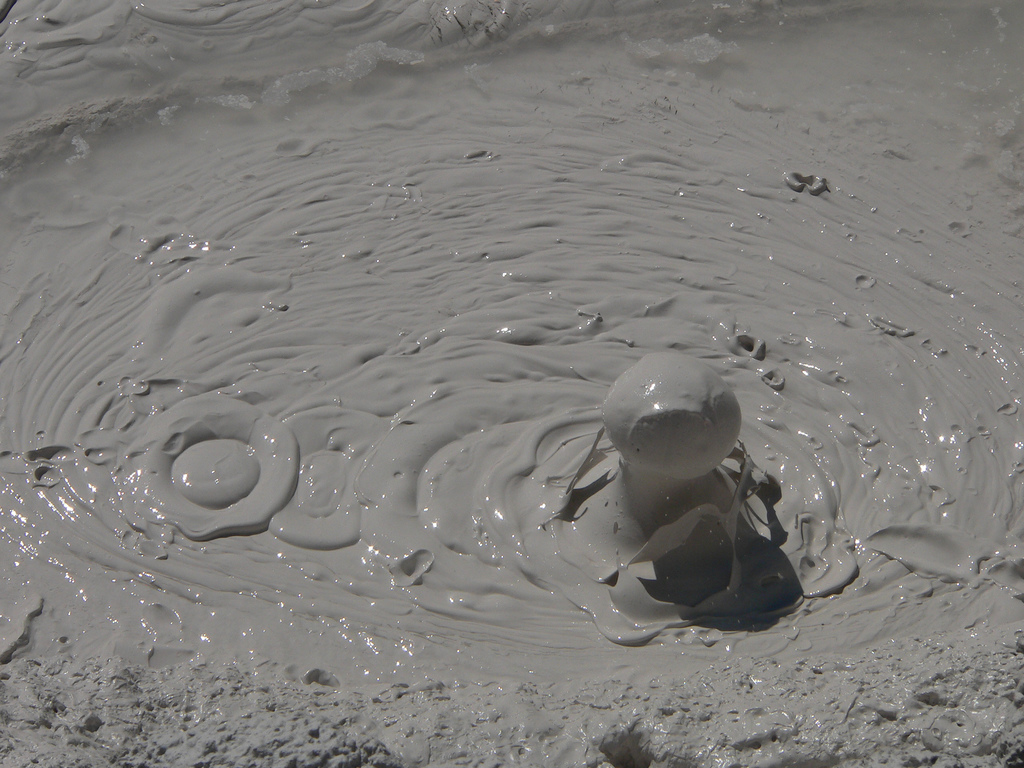
Mudpot in Yellowstone National Park

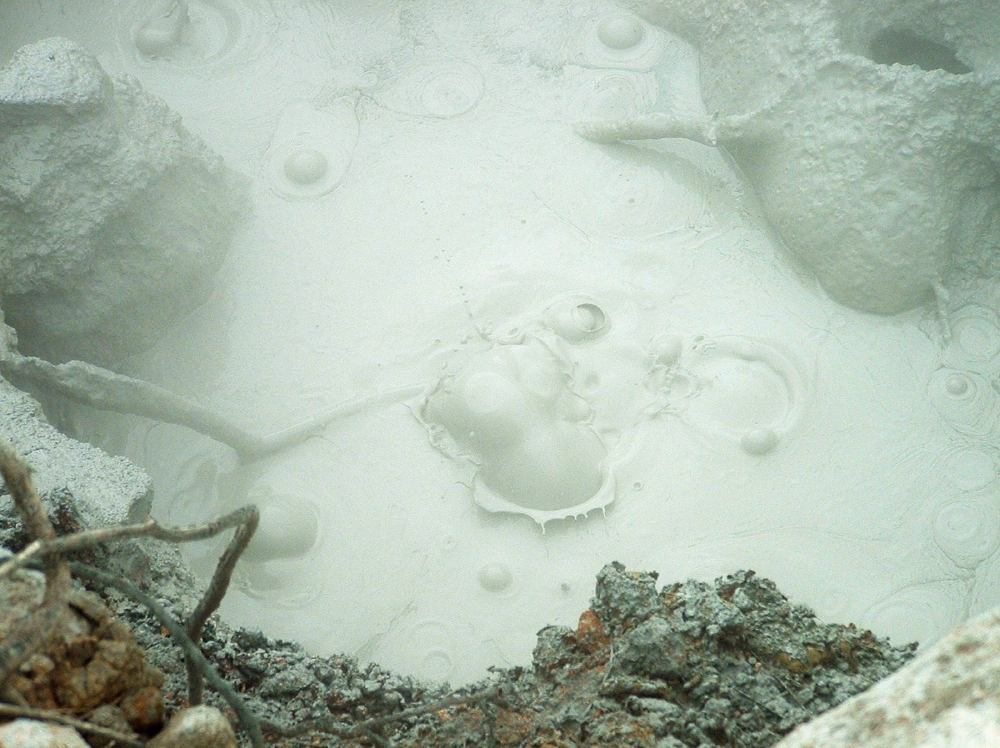
Mudpot at Rincón de la Vieja Volcano National Park, Costa Rica

Short video of mud pool activity near Waiotapu, New Zealand

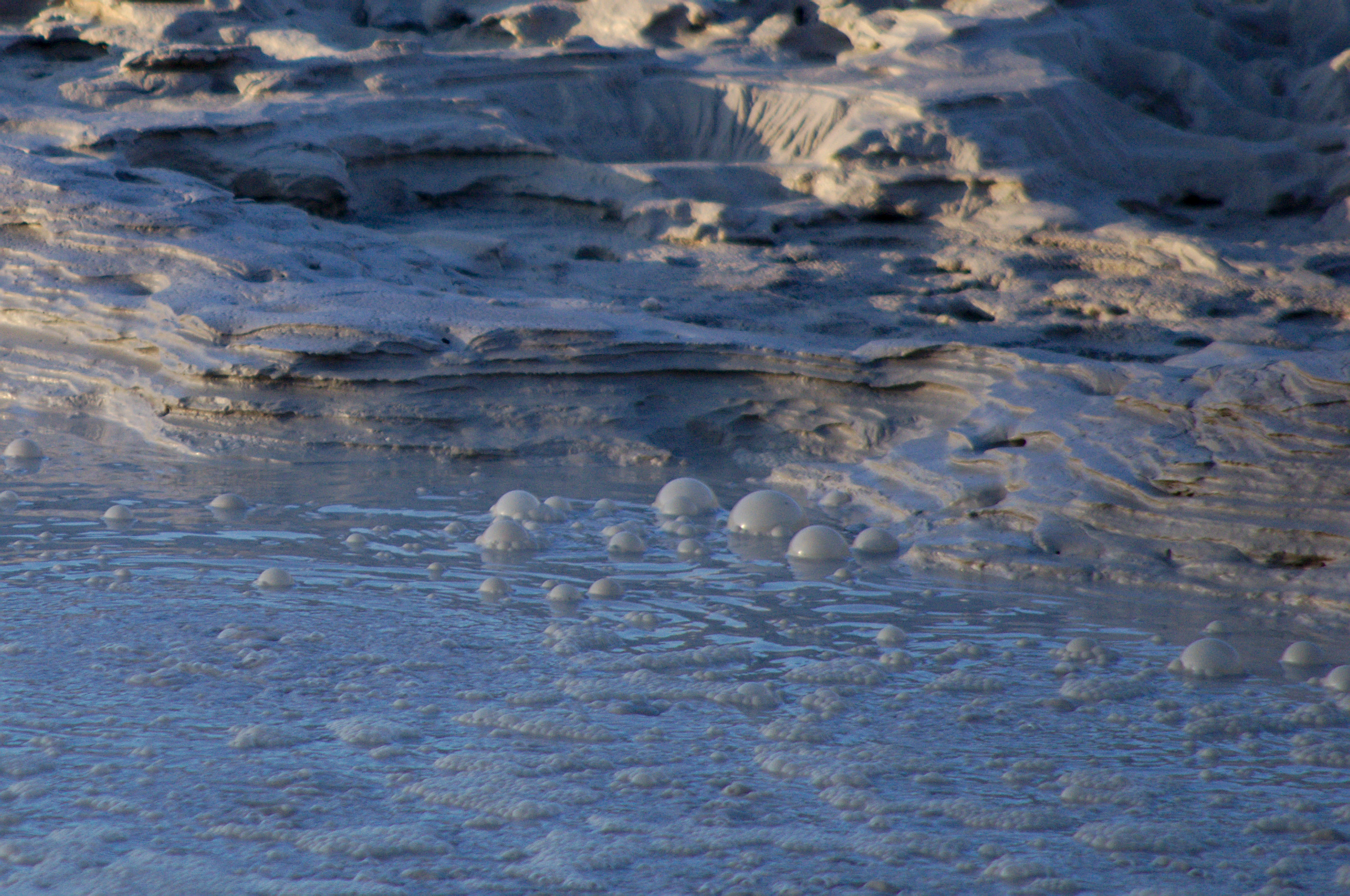
The surface of a boiling mudpot in the crater of Solfatara, part of the Campi Flegrei complex, Italy

Video of mud pool at Orakei Korako, New Zealand

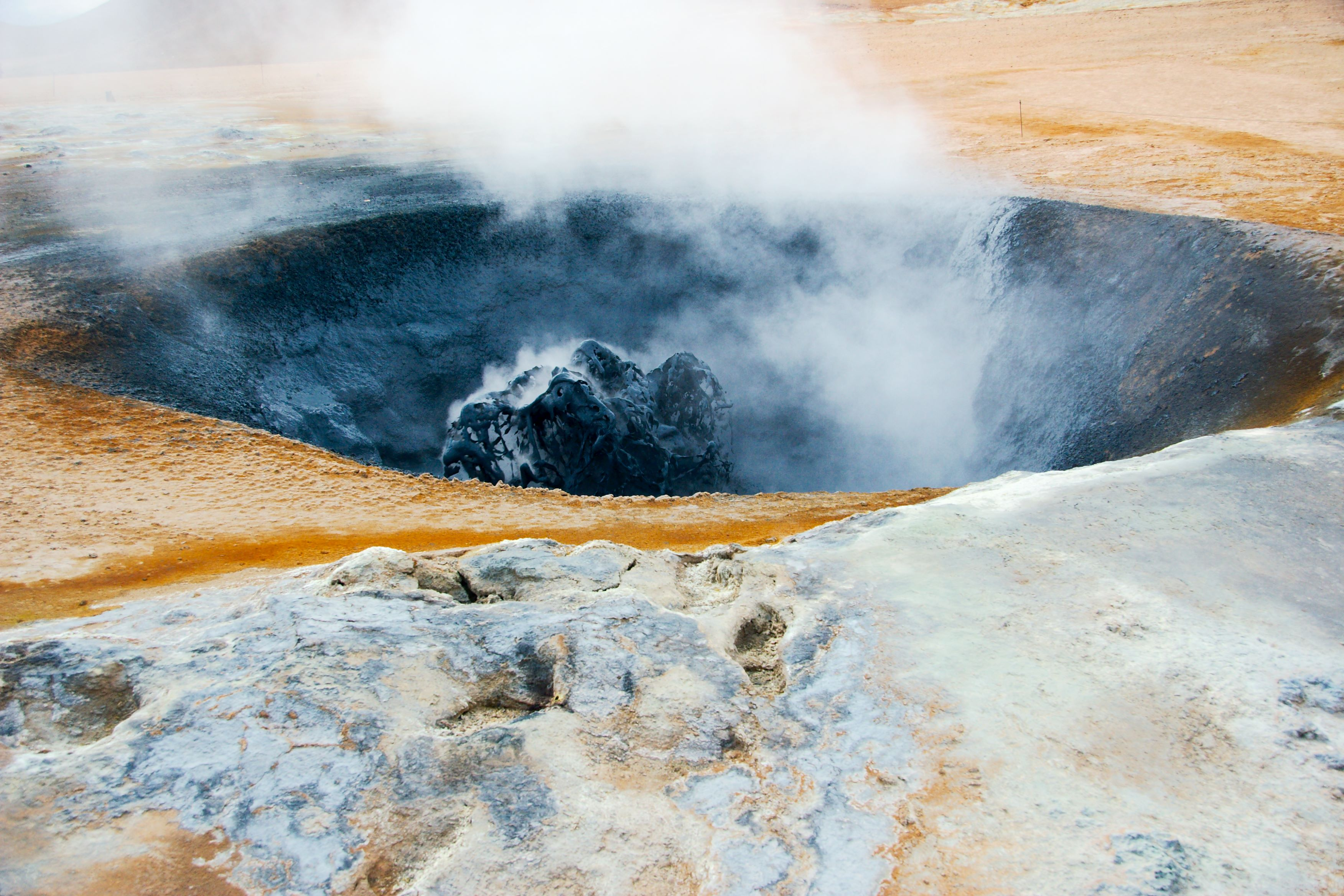
Erupting mudpot at Hverir, Iceland

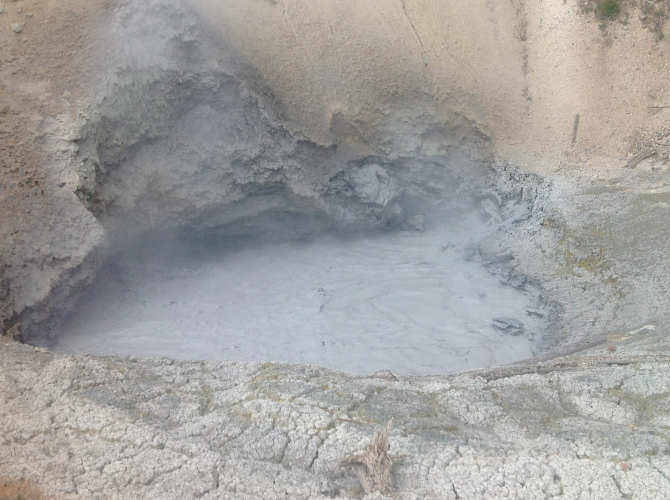
A mud pot in Yellowstone National Park, Wyoming
