= Magee Peak =

Stratovolcano in California, USA

Highest point
- Elevation: 8,684 ft (2,647 m)
- Coordinates: 40°41′21″N 121°37′08″W

Geology
- Rock age: 2 million years
- Mountain type: Stratovolcano
- Rock type: Andesite
- Volcanic arc: Cascade Volcanic Arc
- Last eruption: 1 to 2 million years ago

Magee Peak is a stratovolcano in the Cascade Volcanic Arc north of Lassen Peak in Shasta County, California, United States. It was last active 1 to 2 million years ago.

The peak is a destination for hikers, and marks the end of the Magee Trail hiking trail. There was once a watchtower at Magee Peak.

Magee Peak also has a number of smaller peaks and cliffs, such as Crater Peak, Red Cliff, Gray Cliff, and Fredonyer Peak. Magee Peak has a large cirque on its northeast side.

== Geography ==
Magee Peak is in Shasta County. It is located north of both Lassen Peak and its volcanic field and southeast of Mount Shasta.
