= El Camino, California =

Special district in California, United States

El Camino
- Special district
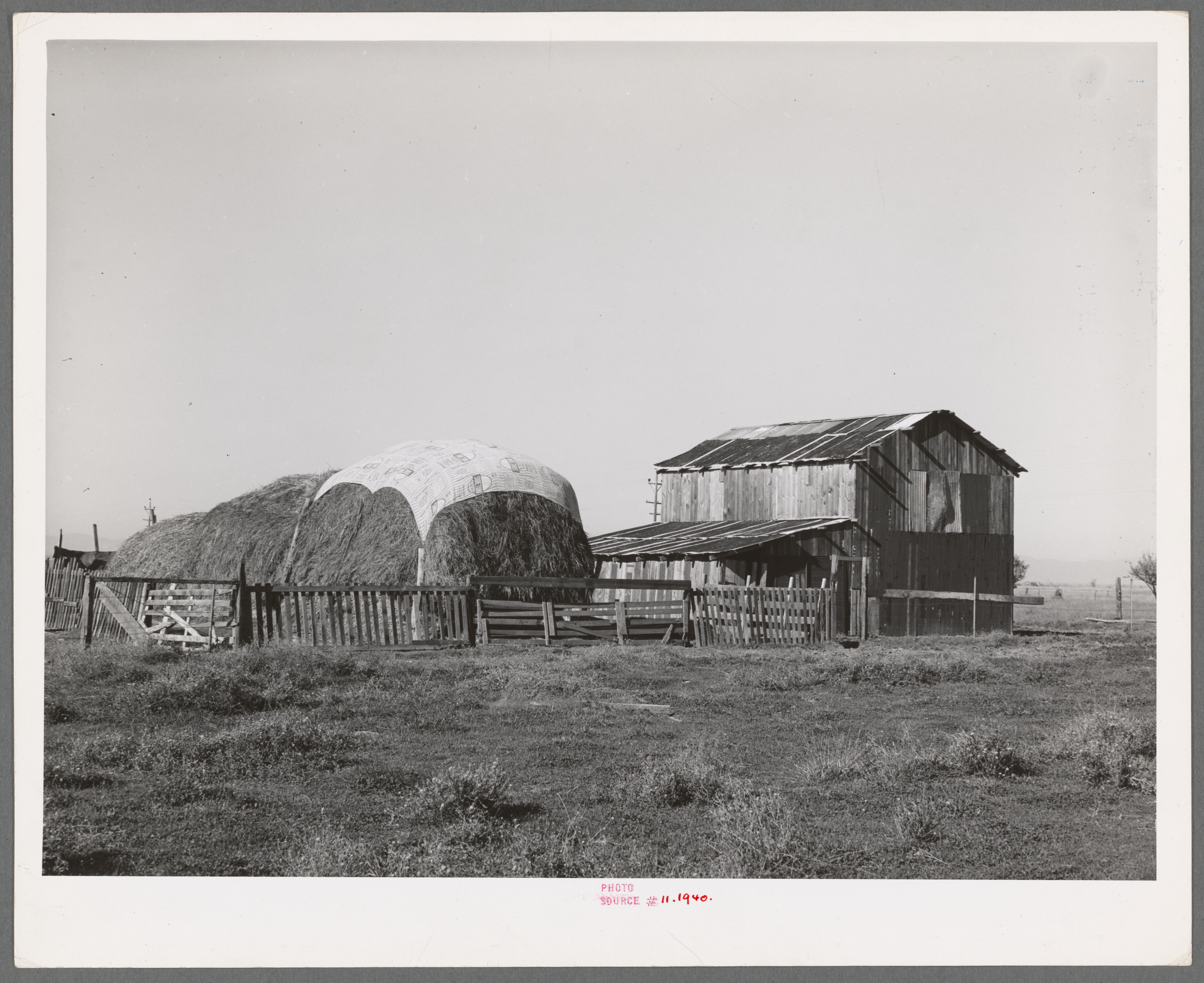
- Haystack and barn in El Camino district farm, 1940

- Location in California
- Coordinates: 40°02′28″N 122°10′14″W
- Country: United States
- State: California
- County: Tehama
- Elevation: 259 ft (79 m)
- Website: elcaminoirrigation.specialdistrict.org

El Camino (Spanish for "The Path") is a rural community and irrigation district near Gerber in Tehama County, in the U.S. state of California. As a special district, the El Camino Irrigation District is owned by local residents who govern it through locally elected board members.

Historically, the district was a subdivision, in California law, of what used to be the Finnell Ranch, which in the early 20th century was part of the El Camino Colony.

== History ==
=== From Mexican land grant to the Finnell Ranch ===
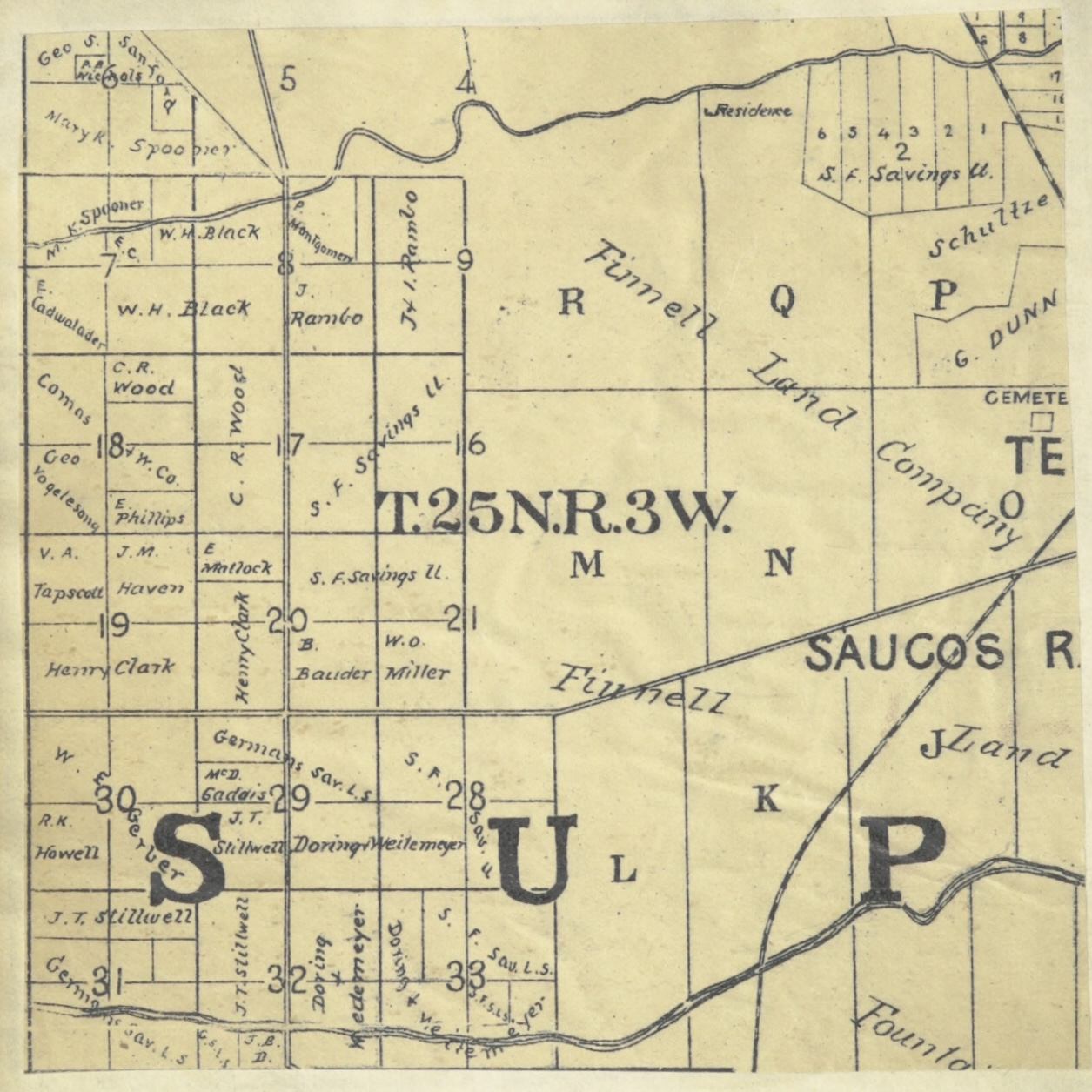
Finnell Land Company holdings on old Saucos Rancho, near Tehama city, 1903

The Finnell Ranch was, before the Great Depression, a 48,000 acres (19,000 ha) ranch devoted to beef cattle owned by Simpson Finnell Sr, who bought it in 1910. Finnell's parents had earlier leased the 2,000 acres (810 ha) J. R. Walsh ranch at St John, and later he and they moved to Tacoma and bought land as the Finnell Land Company. At one point Finnell owned 50,000 acres (20,000 ha) for his cattle operations, stretching from Proberta to Corning and including range land in the mountains.

The ranch had its own railroad siding, named Finnell, between Tehama and Richfield later to be the path of the Finnell Road. 4,800 acres (1,900 ha) of the old ranch holding was bought, around 1910, by the Richfield Land Company in order to form the town of Richfield, which contained the old Finnell Ranch headquarters building.

The ranch was originally a 22,095 acres (8,942 ha) land grant to Robert Hasty Thomas called Rancho de Los Saucos or Rancho de Thomes, and the brick house erected by Robert Thomes there somewhere around the late 1860s or early 1870s stood on Finnell Ranch until 1943, when it was destroyed by fire.

=== Subdivision in the 1920s, irrigation district, and grange ===
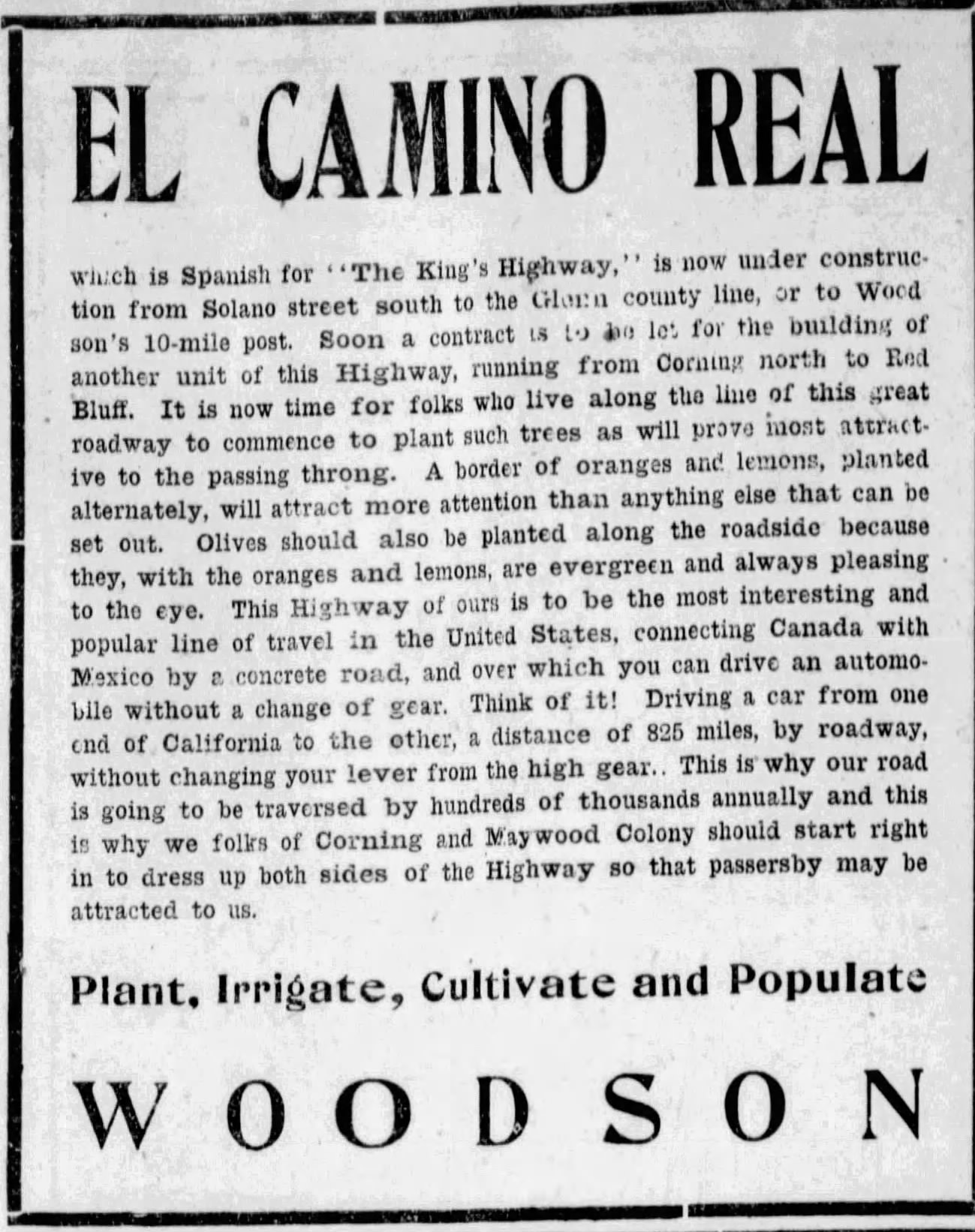
An El Camino Real for Tehama County was created near Corning and Maywood Colony (an orchard district southeast of Thomes Creek) by early 20th-century community boosters (Corning Daily Observer, 1914)

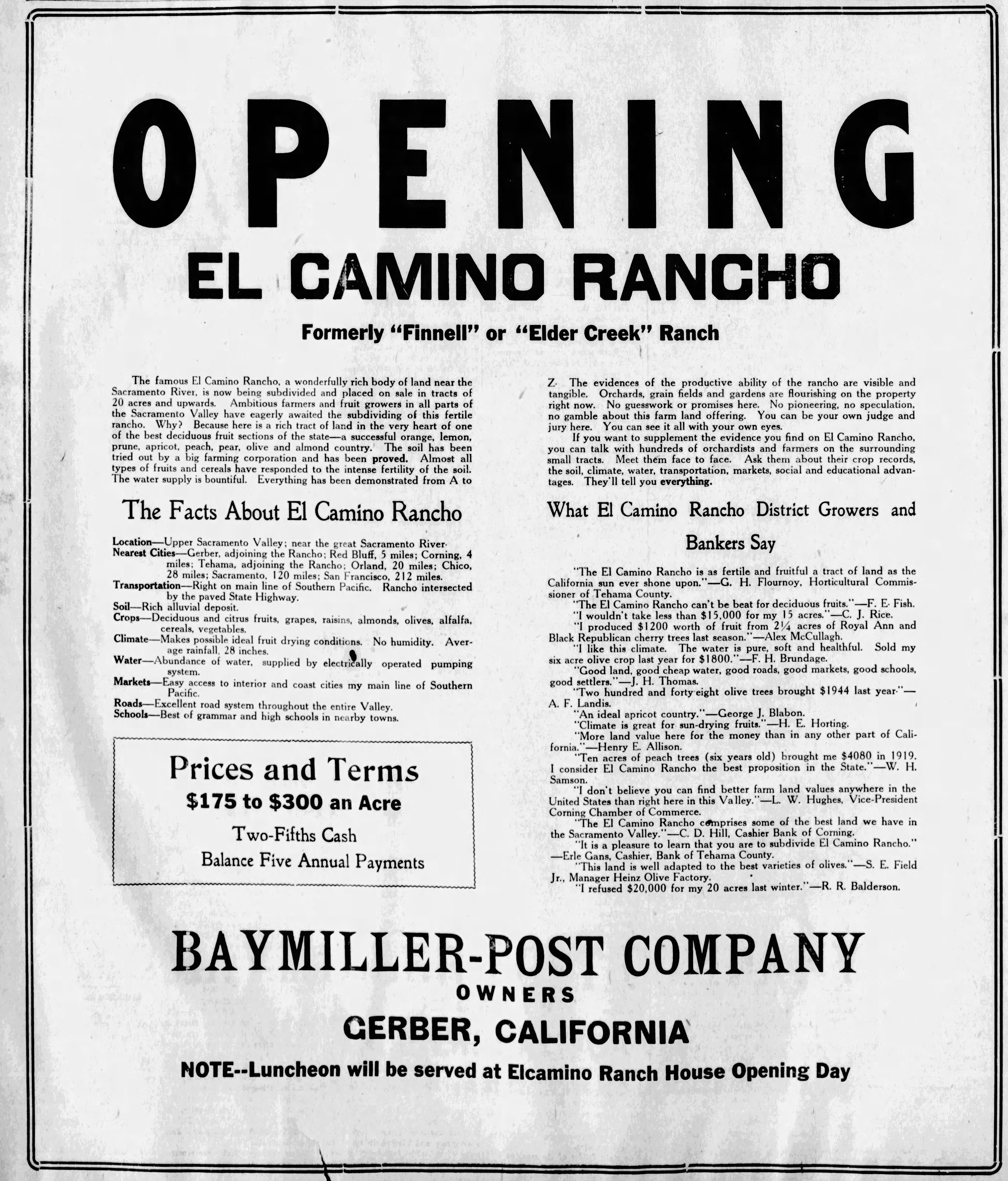
Advertisement for the El Camino subdivision (The Corning Daily Observer, April 9, 1920)

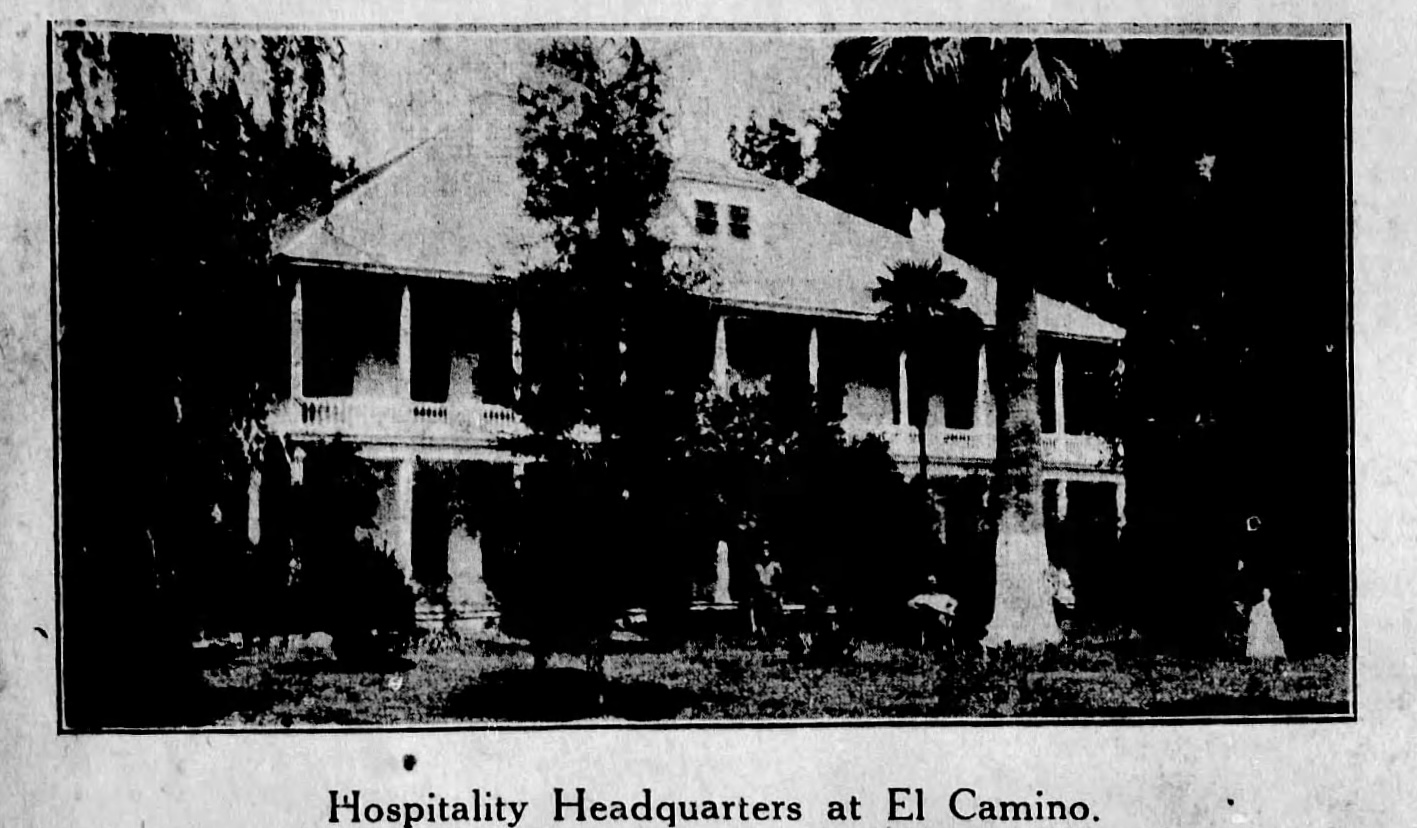
"Hospitality headquarters at El Camino" image from an ad promising "semi-tropical verdure" and real-estate wealth in Tehama County (Corning Advance, 1927)

El Camino was laid out as a residential subdivision of 20-acre tracts in 1920. As of 1923, developers claimed that 800 families from southern California and Idaho would soon be moving into the land, which was 8,000 acres (3,200 ha) of the Mexican-era land grant. Twelve houses were under construction and residents were raising cherries, apricots, plums, grapes, and olives. Prune plums were a major product of the district in 1928.

On April 12, 1921, the El Camino Irrigation District was organized under the California Irrigation District Act, and became a political subdivision under California Law in 1926. It took its name from the El Camino Colony, which was a later name for one of the subdivisions of the Finnell Ranch. What remained of the ranch outside of the subdivided Colony and later district became the Elder Creek Ranch, the Gallatin Ranch, and a few other holdings. The Finnell ranch house had stood until 1967, when it burned down in a fire.

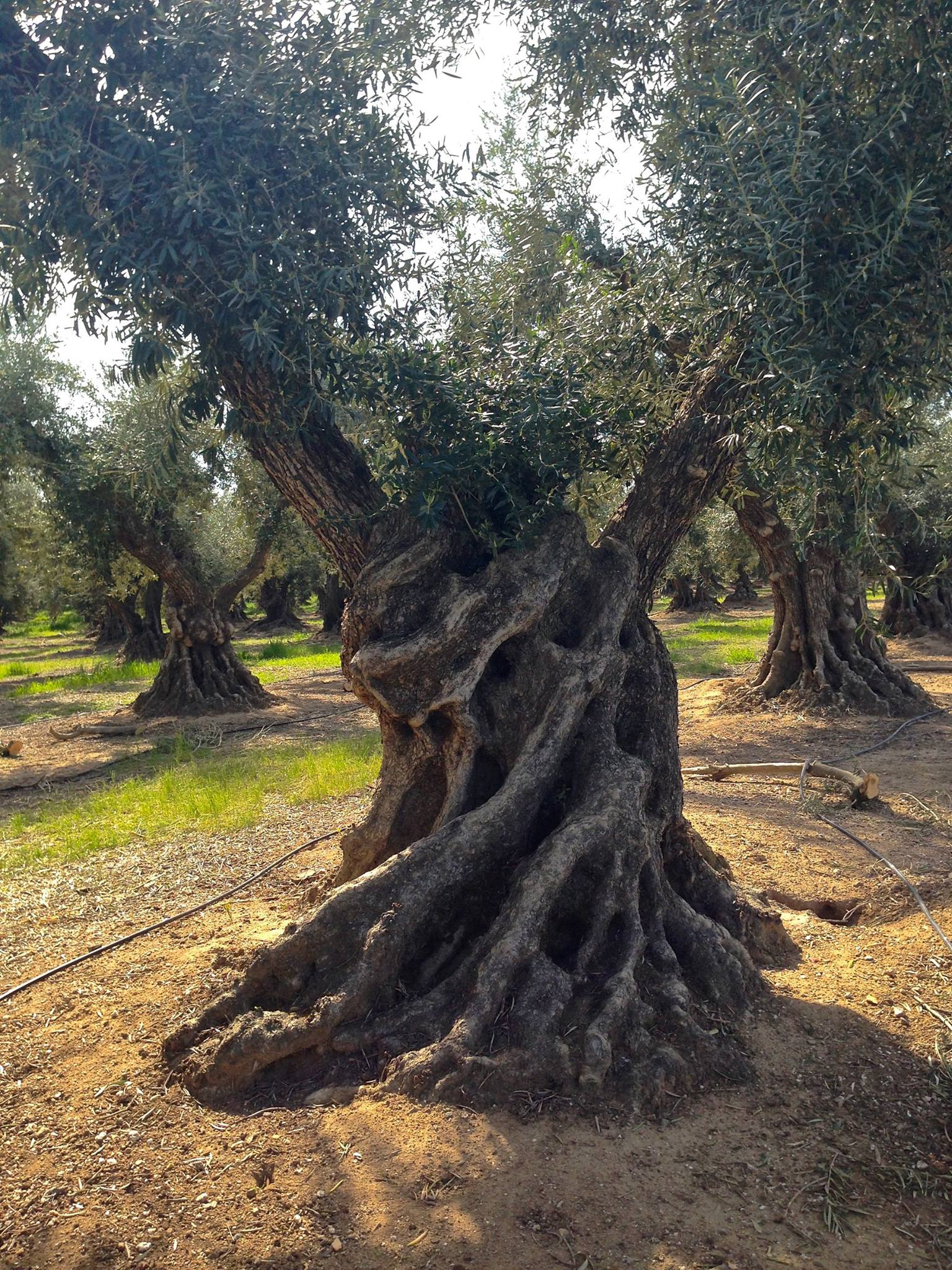
Sevillano olive orchard near Corning, California (2015)

The irrigation district is located in the Tehama-Colusa Canal service area. The irrigation itself was constructed by the Baymiller Post Company, which subdivided the El Camino ranch in 1921. The irrigation was, from then until its formal creation as a district, leased from Baymiller Post, which owned the Tehama Canal Company.

The El Camino Grange, the local chapter of the national agricultural advocacy group, was established in 1931, with 63 charter members, at the El Camino community hall.

=== Late 20th century ===
As of 1988, the El Camino irrigation district comprised 7,500 acres (3,000 ha), with a population of approximately 400 families. The land was mainly used for dairy and beef farming in the 1970s, changing to orchards and row crops in the 1980s.

Based on 1990 census data, a United States Department of Agriculture report found that the population of the Richfield-El Camino "block group" within Tehama County was 961.

== Recent developments ==
In 2007, a proposal to reclassify the district from composite cropland to valley floor agricultural in an effort to limit further residential growth was a topic of controversy within the El Camino community.

The old El Camino Grange Hall was used until at least 2009 to host meetings and children's activities for the Junior Grange, while also being sublet to a business. The building was demolished in 2020. El Camino continues to have an active 4-H club program.

As of 2022, El Camino United Methodist Church, established in 1927, continued to serve as a polling place. The church has also been used for services by the New Life Baptist Church.

Due to budget limitations, from 2004 to 2014, the El Camino Fire Station was staffed entirely by volunteer firefighters from the local community. In 2014, funding was approved for two paid personnel from the ranks of captain, engineers, and firefighters to augment the volunteer staff. As of 2023, the Fire Station/Company 9 of El Camino, established in 1958, continued to serve the communities of El Camino, Proberta, Gerber, Los Flores, and South Red Bluff.
