= Rancho Barranca Colorado =

Mexican land grant in California

Coordinates: 40.120°N 122.220°W

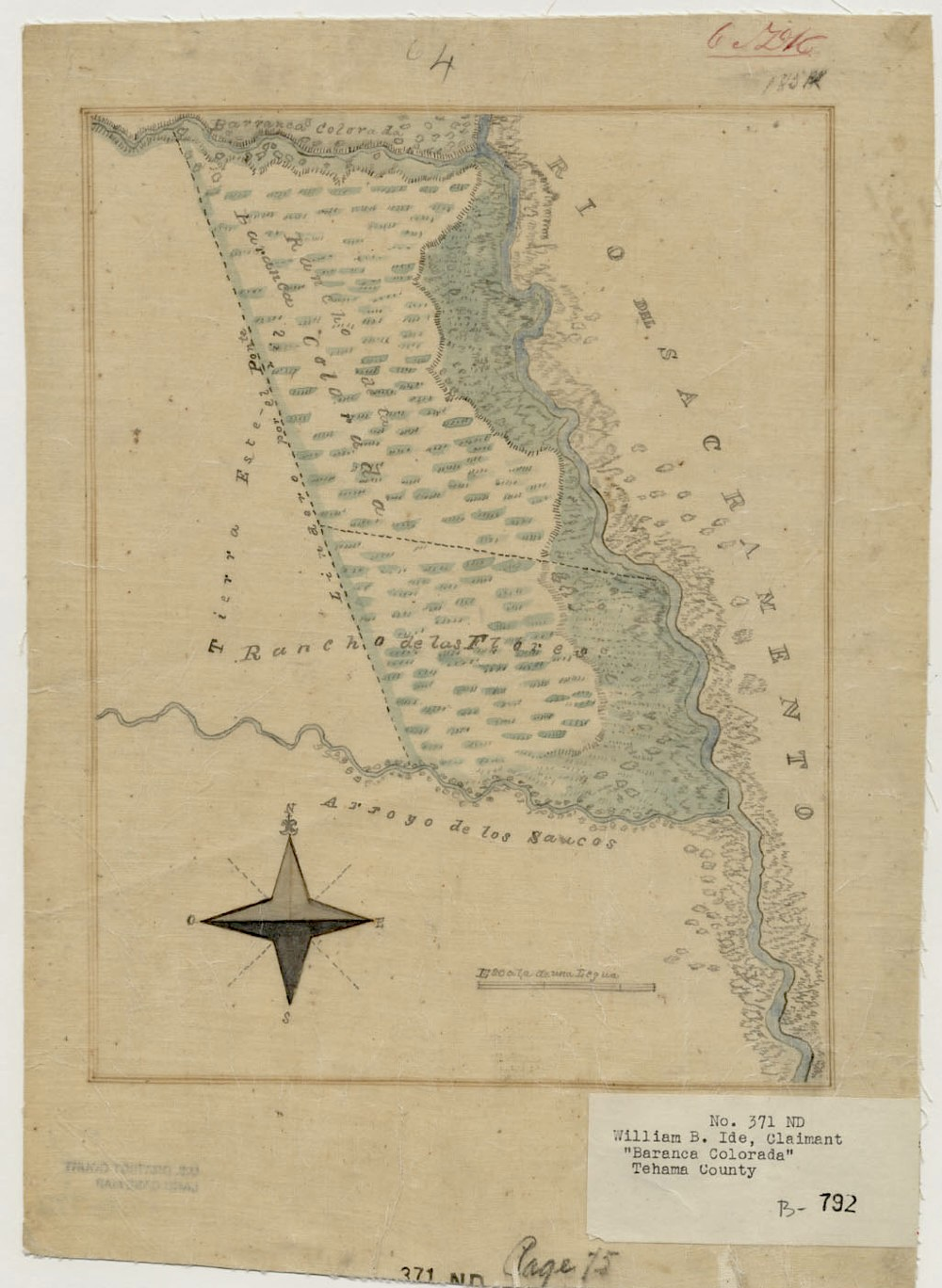
Diseño del Rancho de la Baranca Colorada c. 1844

Rancho Barranca Colorado was a 17,707-acre (71.66 km^{2}) Mexican land grant in present-day Tehama County, California given in 1844 by Governor Manuel Micheltorena to Josiah Belden. The name means "Ranch of the Red Bluffs". The grant was on the west bank of the Sacramento River and bounded Red Bank Creek on the north, and Coyote Creek and Rancho Las Flores on the south. The grant was about 2 miles (3.2 km) south of present-day Red Bluff.

== History ==
Josiah Belden (1815–1892) arrived in California with the Bartleson-Bidwell Party in 1841. Belden, a naturalized Mexican citizen, received the four square league Rancho Barranca Colorado grant in 1844. Belden did not live on the land grant, and in 1846, gave William B. Ide ownership to half of the rancho, in exchange for Ide operating the ranch. William Brown Ide (1796–1852), 49 years old, arrived at Sutter's Fort in 1845, and then went to work on Peter Lassen's Rancho Bosquejo. Belden was a resident of San Jose in 1849, when he sold the entire rancho to the Ide family.

With the cession of California to the United States following the Mexican-American War, the 1848 Treaty of Guadalupe Hidalgo provided that the land grants would be honored. As required by the Land Act of 1851, a claim for Rancho Barranca Colorado was filed with the Public Land Commission in 1852, and the grant was patented to William B. Ide in 1860.

William Ide died of smallpox in 1852 at the age of 56.

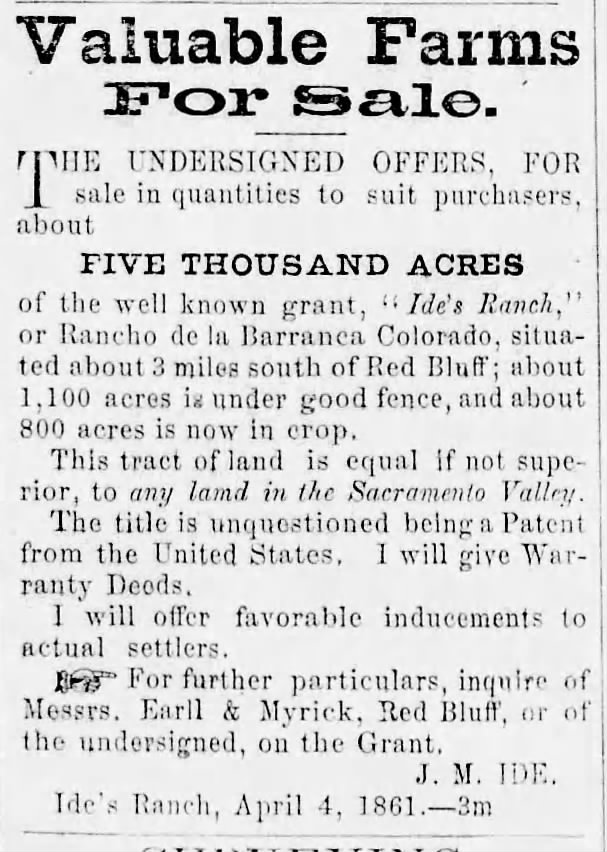
Ide's heirs began selling off the land shortly after the U.S. government approved the rancho patent ("Valuable Farms for Sale" The Red Bluff Beacon, April 18, 1861)

== Historic sites of the Rancho ==
- William B. Ide Adobe State Historic Park.

== See also ==
- Red Bank, California
