= Gerber-Las Flores, California =

Unincorporated community in California, United States

Gerber-Las Flores
- former census-designated place
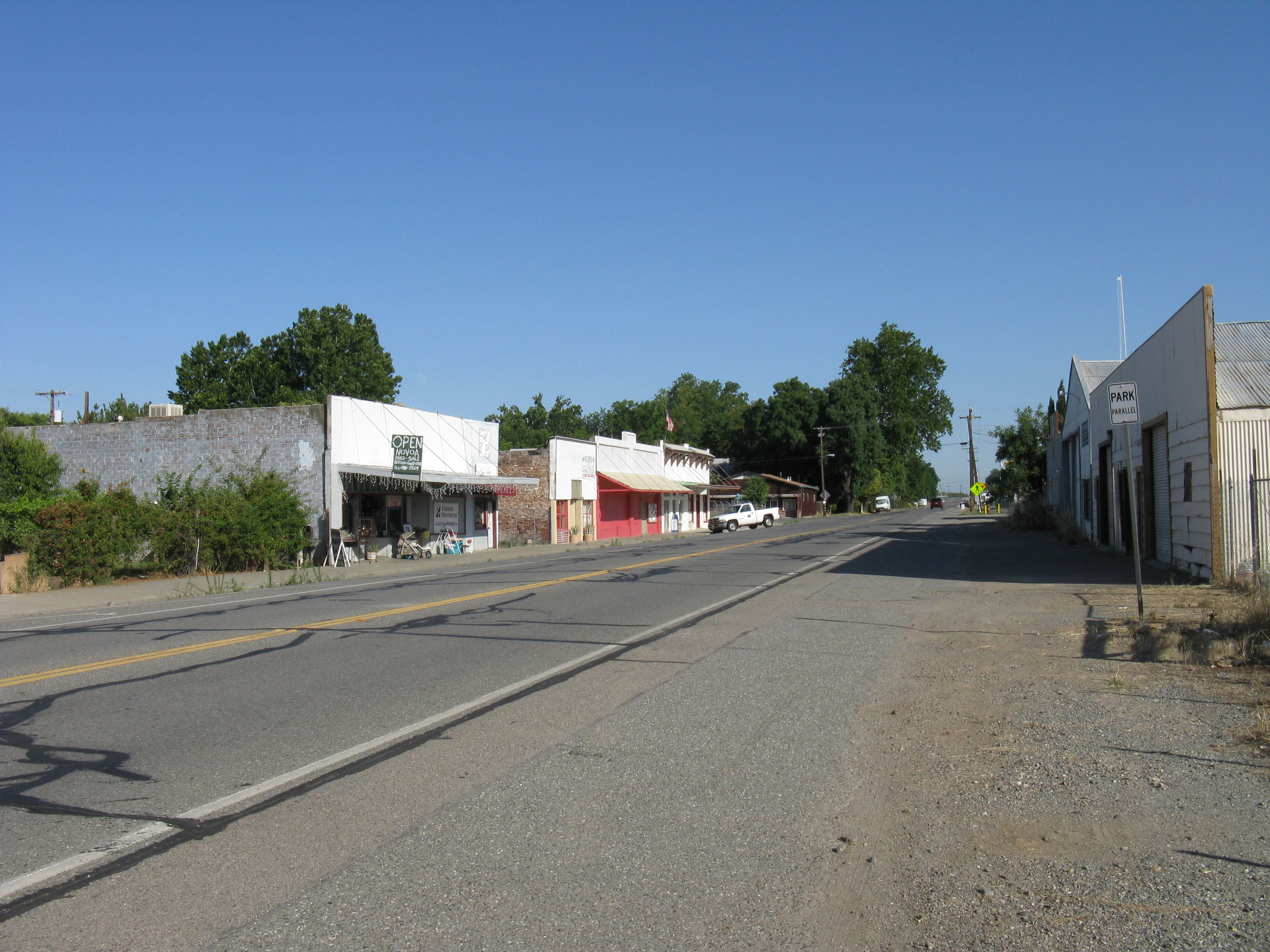
- The small business district in Gerber

- Location in Tehama County and the state of California
- Coordinates: 40°3′35″N 122°9′5″W
- Country: United States
- State: California
- County: Tehama

Area
  - Total: 1.3 sq mi (3.3 km^{2})
  - Land: 1.3 sq mi (3.3 km^{2})
  - Water: 0 sq mi (0 km^{2})

Population (2000)
  - Total: 1,389
  - Density: 1,090/sq mi (420.9/km^{2})
- Time zone: UTC-8 (Pacific (PST))
  - Summer (DST): UTC-7 (PDT)
- ZIP code: 96035
- Area code: 530
- FIPS code: 06-29399

Gerber-Las Flores is a former census-designated place (CDP) in Tehama County, California, United States. The population was 1,389 at the 2000 census.

In 2010, it was divided into two new CDPs, Gerber and Las Flores.

== Geography ==
Gerber-Las Flores is located at 40°3′35″N 122°9′5″W (40.059757, -122.151299).

According to the United States Census Bureau, the CDP had a total area of 1.3 square miles (3.4 km^{2}), all land.

== Demographics ==
As of the census of 2000, there were 1,389 people, 451 households, and 339 families residing in the CDP. The population density was 1,103.6 inhabitants per square mile (426.1/km^{2}). There were 480 housing units at an average density of 381.4 per square mile (147.3/km^{2}). The racial makeup of the CDP was 62.06% White, 0.43% African American, 4.32% Native American, 0.36% Asian, 0.07% Pacific Islander, 28.94% from other races, and 3.82% from two or more races. Hispanic or Latino of any race were 40.96% of the population.

There were 451 households, out of which 45.0% had children under the age of 18 living with them, 55.4% were married couples living together, 12.2% had a female householder with no husband present, and 24.8% were non-families. 19.7% of all households were made up of individuals, and 9.1% had someone living alone who was 65 years of age or older. The average household size was 3.08 and the average family size was 3.55.

In the CDP, the population was spread out, with 35.0% under the age of 18, 9.1% from 18 to 24, 28.0% from 25 to 44, 16.6% from 45 to 64, and 11.3% who were 65 years of age or older. The median age was 30 years. For every 100 females, there were 100.4 males. For every 100 females age 18 and over, there were 105.2 males.

The median income for a household in the CDP was $24,107, and the median income for a family was $29,464. Males had a median income of $27,098 versus $17,434 for females. The per capita income for the CDP was $11,888. About 22.8% of families and 28.7% of the population were below the poverty line, including 40.3% of those under age 18 and 13.7% of those age 65 or over.

== Politics ==
In the state legislature Gerber-Las Flores is in the 4th Senate District, represented by Republican Doug LaMalfa, and in the 2nd Assembly District, represented by Republican Jim Nielsen.

Federally, Gerber-Las Flores is in California's 1st congressional district, represented by Republican James Gallagher.
