= Colyear Springs =

Spring in California, U.S.

Colyear Springs is a spring in the U.S. state of California. The spring is located 4 miles (6.4 km) north of Raglin Ridge. Colyear Springs was named after John G. Colyear, a pioneer settler. Variant names were "Colyer Springs" and "Colyer's Springs". According to a California State Bureau of Mines report of 1917, "These springs are situated high on the mountain side north of the North Fork of Elder Creek, 35 miles west of Red Bluff. Six springs here rise in a cemented place 5 yards in diameter, among the pine trees, on a moderate slope. One of the largest yields cold sulphur water, while the others are only slightly sulphuretted. On the slope about 8 yards above these springs, there is a clear water spring that yields 4 to 5 gallons a minute. Dr. J. A. Owen of Red Bluff, owner."
