= Lowrey, California =

Unincorporated community in California, United States

Coordinates: 40°00′50″N 122°33′12″W

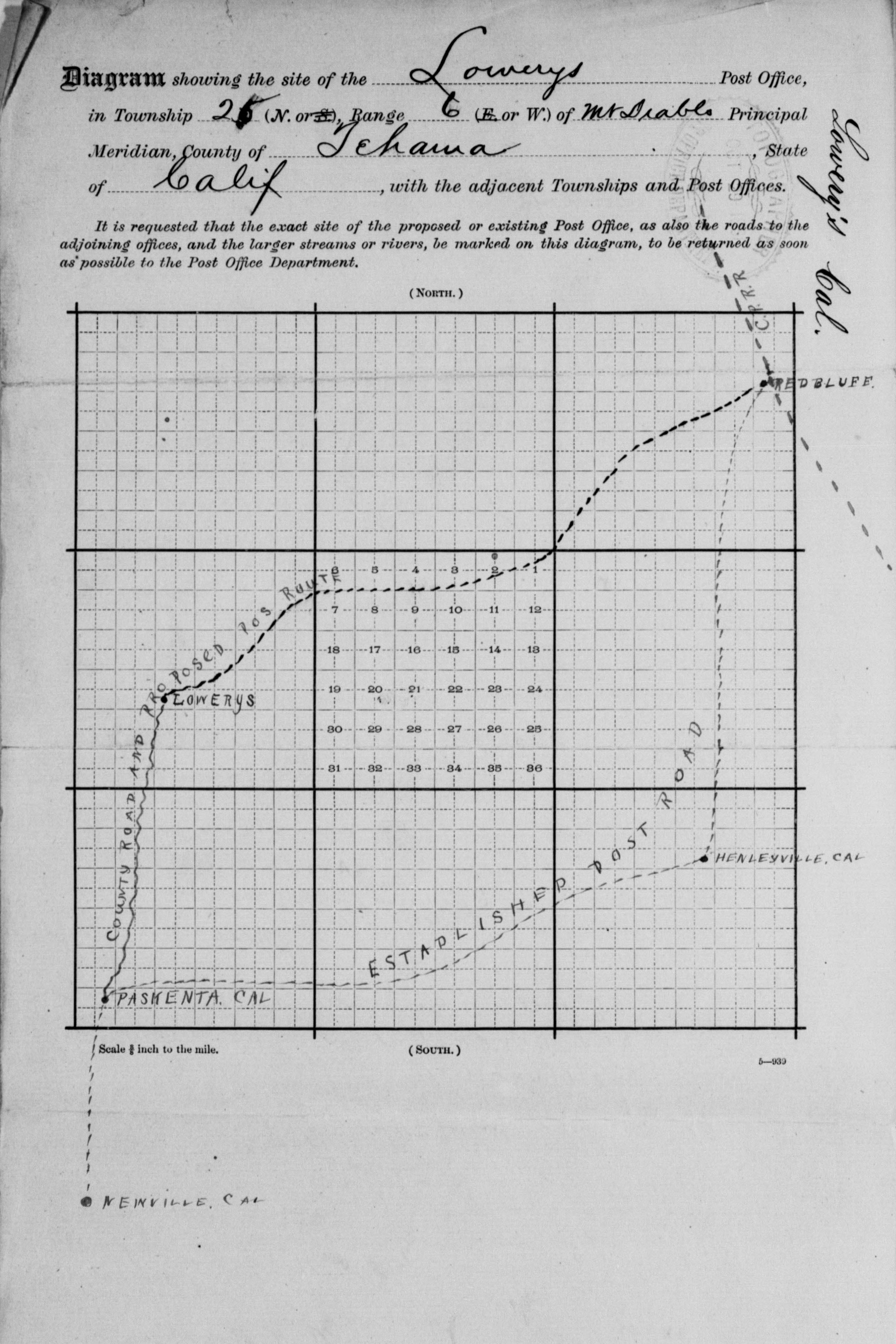
Lowrey's, Tehama County, California (1888)

Lowrey's was a settlement in Tehama County, California, United States that was named for George M. Lowrey and located on Elder Creek. All that remains of it today are a ranch and a road named Lowrey Road.

== Early history of George M. Lowrey and arrival in California ==
George Malay Lowrey came to California in 1849. He had been born in Montgomery County, Ohio on 1826-10-26; the fifth child of James Lowrey, a miller from Kentucky, and Nancy Lowrey (née Stoker) from Virginia. Having left school at 17, he had worked in the Mount Savage iron works, and as a carpenter for 3 years, both in Maryland.

He arrived at Sacramento on 1849-08-13, moved to Dry Diggings shortly thereafter, and in 1850 built himself and ran a hotel between Sacramento and Nevada City. He gave up the hotel after two years and went into teaming, going back to Ohio and then coming to California again in 1863. He was in the cattle industry with a business partner in Solano County for eight years from 1857, and also raised sheep.

He married Sarah Morrow Foster from Belfast (born 1826-03-21, and daughter of a farmer, cattleman, and drover) in Calvary Presbyterian Church in San Francisco on 1865-08-29. They were to have four daughters and three sons together.

== Establishment of Lowrey's ==
In 1870, Lowrey and a business partner bought 1,040 acres (420 ha) of land in Tehama, which he was to expand with additional purchases over time to a peak 4,000 acres (1,600 ha), which they used for sheep farming. He bought out his partner in 1874, and sold 7000 head of sheep and 2,825 acres (1,143 ha) of his ranchland to avoid bankruptcy, diversifying into cattle and hogs.

His home was the local post office, established in 1888 with himself as the postmaster. The application claimed the post office would serve a settlement of 425 people. The location was likely the south bank of the North Fork of Elder Creek. Its name changed to Lowrey in 1898, and it closed in October 1917 with mail thenceforward being handled at Red Bank.

The Lowrey school, which he also helped to organize, was established in 1873, and closed in 1943. He was the director of the school district and supported the local Union Church.

His daughter Katie became the postmaster at Tehama.

== Mining ==
There were three major chromite mines to the west of Lowrey's in the North Elder Creek area, the Grau Mine, the Kleinsorge Mine, and the Noble Electric Mine. The Grau Mine dates from 1893, the Noble Electric from 1886, and the Kleinsorge from 1916. One of the earliest mines lasted from 1890 to 1899, and only produced 500 tons (450 t) over its lifetime.

The Basler Mining and Development Company consolidated many of the mining claims in the area in the early 1900s. The Kleinsorge was on the mountainside and had a service road down to Lowrey and an aerial tramway for transporting ore down. The Noble Electric, which only produced comparatively little ore, had a service road built in 1919 and did not have its own mill.
