= Elder Creek (Tehama County) =

- Location of Elder Creek in California

Location
- Country: United States
- State: California

Physical characteristics
- Source: California Coast Ranges
  - location: Mendocino National Forest
  - coordinates: 40°00′48″N 122°33′00″W
  - elevation: 801 ft (244 m)
- Mouth: Sacramento River
  - location: Near Gerber
  - coordinates: 40°02′35″N 122°06′57″W
  - elevation: 207 ft (63 m)
- Length: 27 mi (43 km)
- Basin size: 150.5 sq mi (390 km^{2})
- Discharge
  - location: Gerber, California
  - average: 110 cu ft/s (3.1 m^{3}/s)
  - minimum: 0 cu ft/s (0 m^{3}/s)
  - maximum: 14,100 cu ft/s (400 m^{3}/s)

Elder Creek is a major stream in Tehama County, California and a tributary of the Sacramento River. It originates at the confluence of its North, Middle and South Forks, which begin in the Mendocino National Forest, and flows 27 miles (43 km) east to its confluence with the Sacramento River about a mile (1.6 km) east of Gerber and 2 miles (3.2 km) north of Tehama. Measured to the head of its longest tributary, the South Fork, Elder Creek has a total length of 42 miles (68 km), draining a watershed of about 150 square miles (390 km^{2}). Like the other streams draining this part of the western Sacramento Valley, Elder Creek is a highly seasonal stream that flows only during the winter and spring.

Elder Creek was so named for the elder trees lining its course. A variant name was Arroyo de los Saucos.

== See also ==
- List of rivers of California
- Lowrey, California
