= Red Bank, California =

Rural area in Tehama Co., California, United States

Coordinates: 40°05′58″N 122°26′43″W

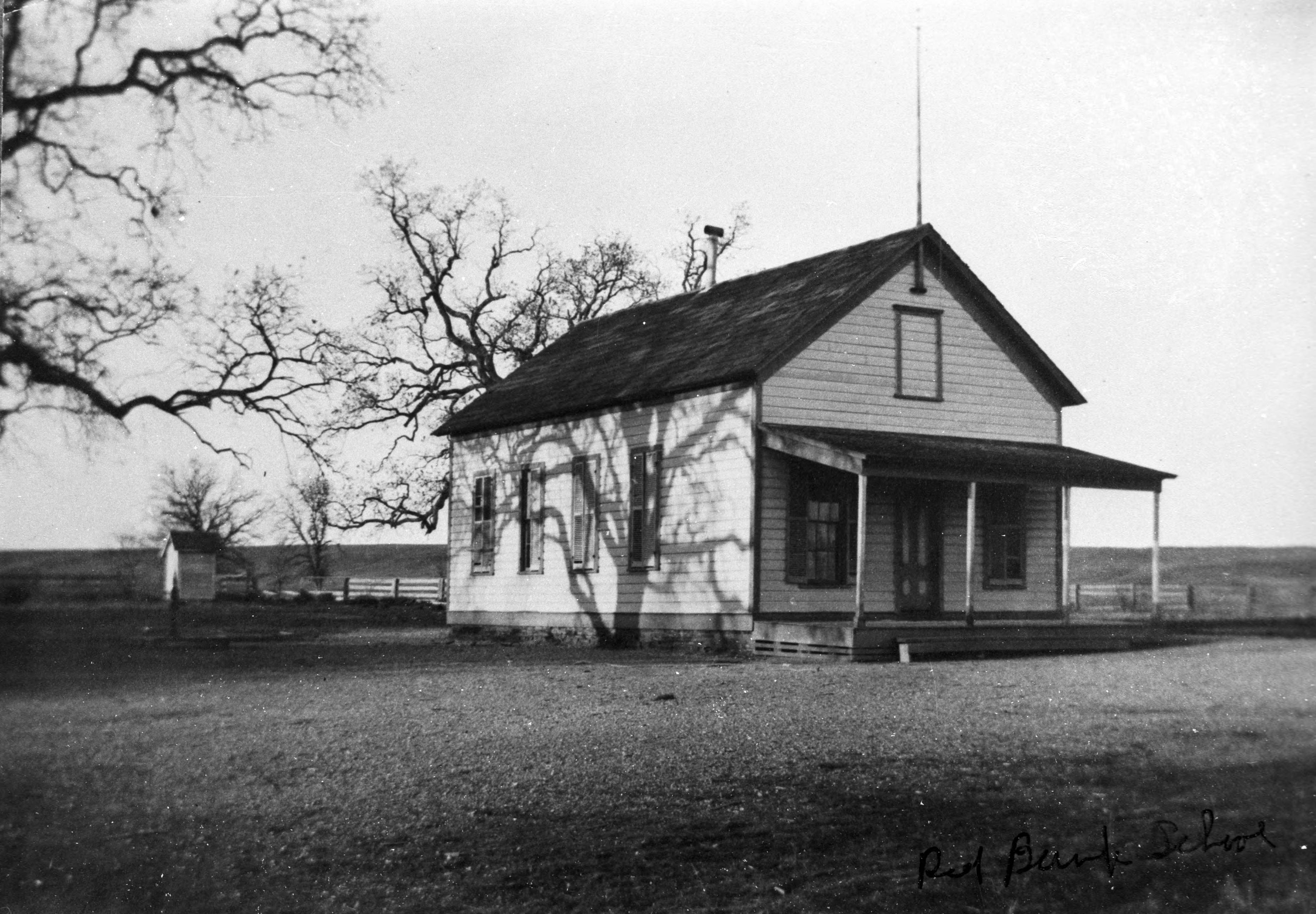
Red Bank School in the early 20th century (Northeastern California Historical Photograph Collection, Cal State Chico)

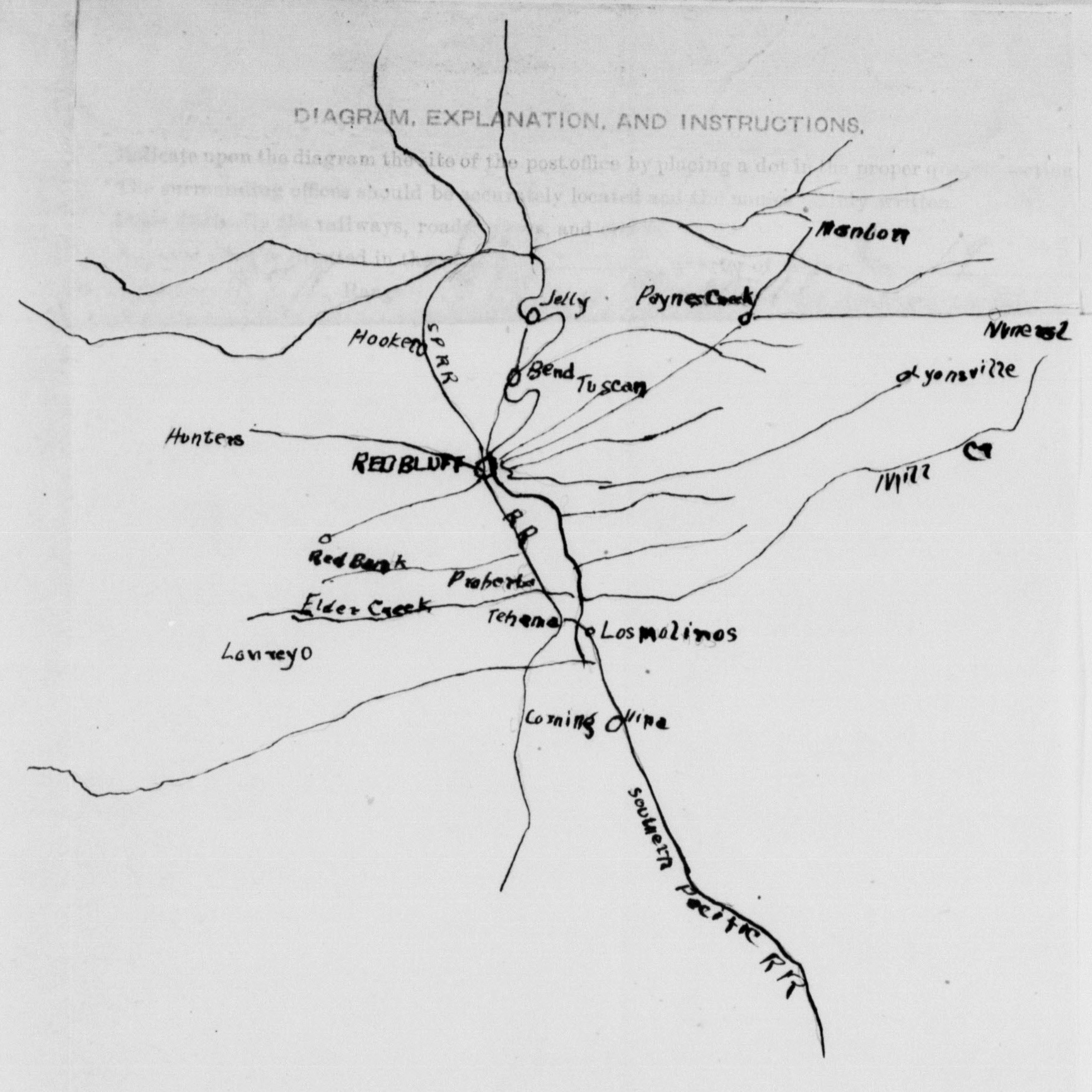
Location of Red Bank on 1915 map of road network surrounding Red Bluff

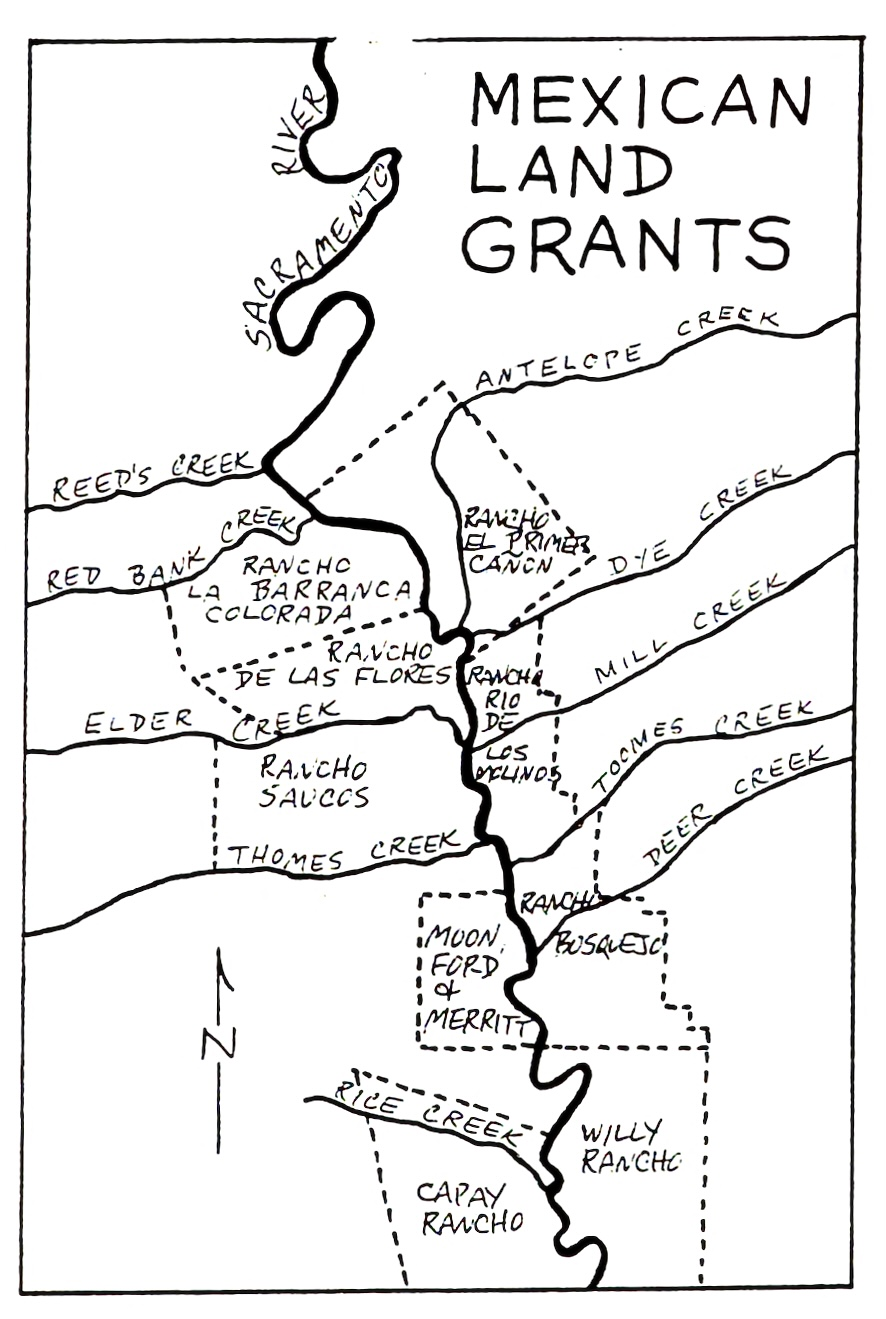
Ranchos of Tehama County

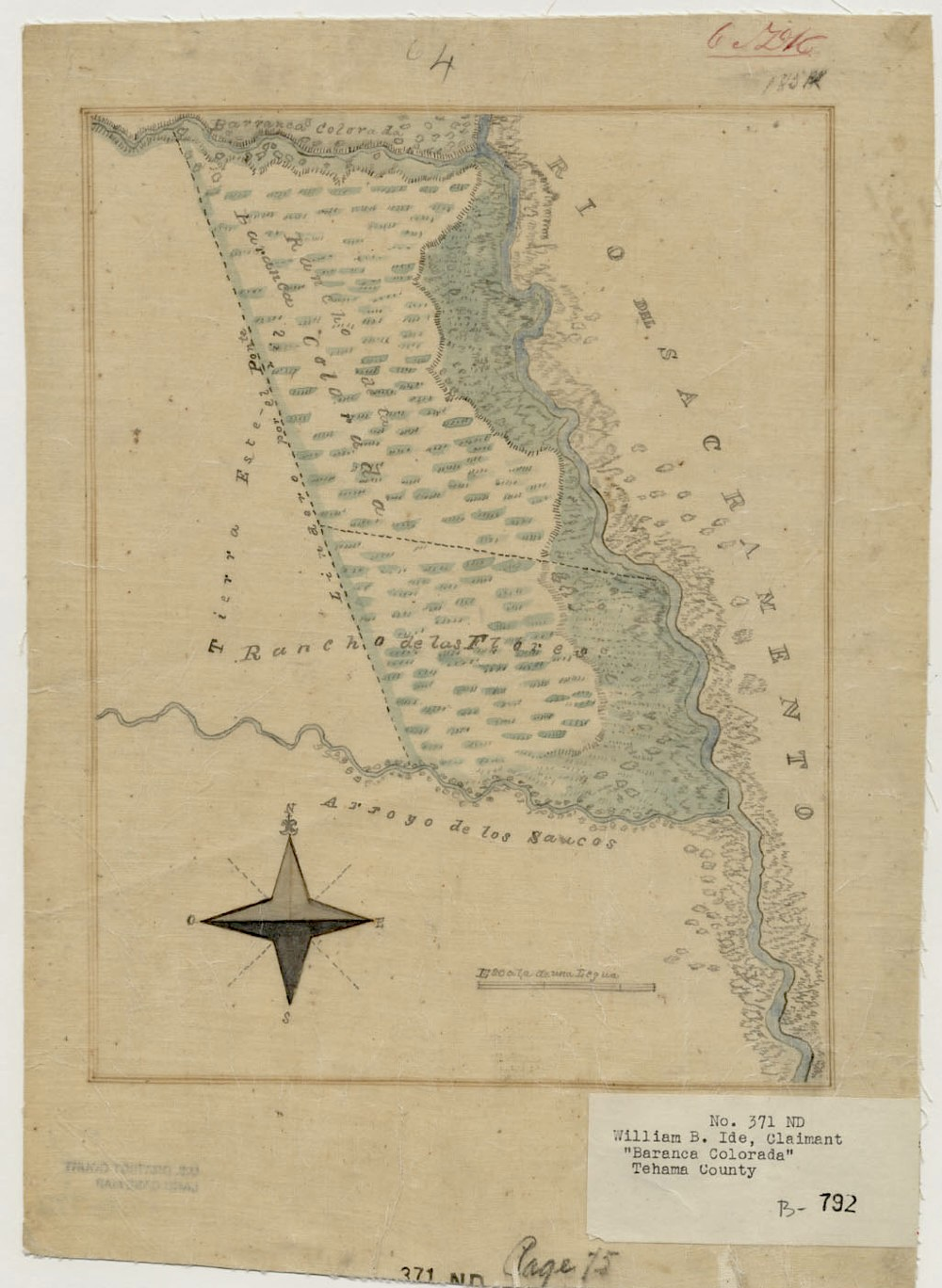
Diseño of Rancho de la Baranca Colorada in Tehama County c. 1844

Red Bank (also Redbank) is an agricultural district in Tehama County, in the U.S. state of California. The district and nearby Red Bank Creek both take their names from Rancho Barranca Colorado (Red Bank in Spanish). The red soil in question was said to be on the north bank of the creek. Red Bank was later the name of a post office in the district, previously named Eby, and of a school in the district.

== History ==
A land grant, dated December 24, 1844, refers to the Barranca Colorado "red ravine". Subdivision of the Barranca ranch began after William Ide's death in 1861. According to a newspaper account of 1933, "Out of this ranch has been carved the Orchard Park settlement, the fine farms of Butte Tyler and Joe Casale, beside several other smaller holdings and there yet remains fragment of the original grant in the Ide estate.

=== Red Bank School ===
The school was the Red Bank School, whose location in the district varied over the years, but in 1891 was just east of the road that connects Lowrey Road with Red Bank Road. It finally closed in 1962. Red Bank School was one of nine one-room schoolhouses in Tehama County in the early 20th century. A former student described the school as a white-shingled building near the creek; inside was a potbelly stove "and a wash basin to hold water from the well, which students used dippers to drink from".

The Meriam Library at Cal State Chico has photographs of the one-room school. Tehama County residents Opal and Archie Kissee photographed almost all the Tehama County schoolhouses, including Red Bank, with color slide film in the 1960s.

=== Post office ===
A post office called Redbank was established in 1904, with postmaster Charles S. Beall, and remained in operation until 1918 when it was moved to Red Bluff. (Beall, or Bell, had a home in Red Bank that burned to the ground in a 1909 fire—the only item saved was a sewing machine.)

The post office had originally been the Colyear (also Colyer) post office, established 10 miles (16 km) southwest of Red Bluff in July 1889, moved 5 miles (8.0 km) west to Eby (and renamed) in April 1894, and finally moving again to Red Bank in 1904. The exact location of Eby post office, named for landowner Jackson Eby, is not clear from historical sources, as maps are either vague or known to be inaccurate. The best source is the Red Bluff Daily News of 1901–1902 which places it in the centre of the school district, 15.5 miles (24.9 km) west of Red Bluff.

=== Other organizations ===
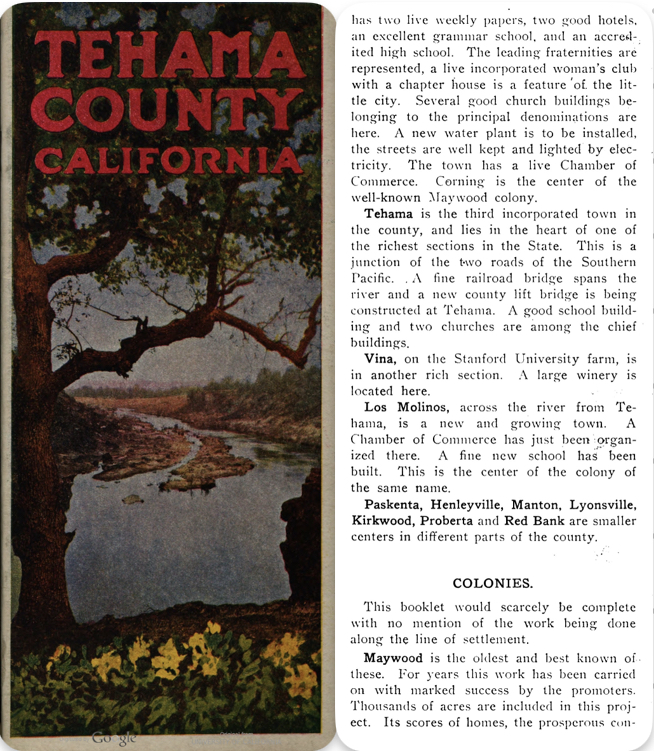
In 1909 a Red Bluff Chamber of Commerce brochure marketing Tehama County described Red Bank as one of the "smaller centers" of the county

In April 1892, a Methodist preacher named J. E. Ray started giving sermons at the school house in Red Bank, and at Union Church in Lowrey.

From 1917 to 1929, the Red Bank branch of the Tehama County public library was in the home of Mrs. C. S. Bell.

The Red Bank Farm Center supported a community baseball team in the 1920s.

The Red Bank 4-H Club restored the Red Bank Cemetery in 1977, including installing a "new archway" that was donated for the "old site". The inactive Red Bank Cemetery is located on Red Bank Road and has six known burials, dating from the 1910s to the 1930s.

== Population ==
Based on 1990 census data, the United States Department of Agriculture found that the Red Bank "block group" had a population of 1,155.

== Agriculture and development ==
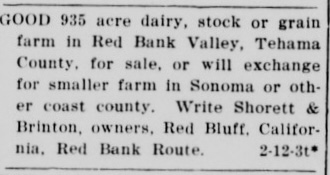
"For sale: Good 935 acre farm in Red Bank Valley..." (Healdsburg Tribune, 1925)

The western watershed of Tehama county is predominately a farming, ranching, or lumbering area, with an average population density of five people per square mile as of 2006. Major crops produced by west Tehama county farms are typically grain, pasture grass, orchard crops, and/or sheep or cows. Milk products from the cows might have been sold over the mountains to Tomales Bay Creamery. One son of a sheep rancher recalled that their Red Bank farm was first hooked up to a party line telephone service with three other farms in the late 1930s. An alfalfa-hog-sheep-cow farmer who moved to Red Bank in 1942 recalled that she and her husband bought land that had already been cultivated for 50 years, but their place did not have an irrigation well until they sank one, nor electricity until 1945.

A telephone line between Red Bank and Red Bluff was connected in 1911, along with a branch line that extended 3 miles (4.8 km) northwest of the Red Bank post office.

In 1977, county planning commissioners denied a developer's request that some land in Red Bank be reclassified from agricultural to agricultural-transitional, which would have allowed for partitioning into smaller lot sizes.

== Red Bank Fire ==
The Red Bank Fire was ignited by a lightning strike on September 5, 2019. The fire burned 8,838 acres (3,577 ha) of oak woods and brushland west of Red Bluff that is used mostly for cattle range, Firefighting in the "rural and rugged" area was hampered by lack of roads. The area at risk was said to have low population density and most structures were "seasonal cabins and ranches". The fire was extinguished on September 13.
