= Las Flores, Tehama County, California =

Las Flores
- census-designated place
- Position in California.
- Coordinates: 40°04′19″N 122°09′28″W
- Country: United States
- State: California
- County: Tehama

Area
  - Total: 0.358 sq mi (0.926 km^{2})
  - Land: 0.358 sq mi (0.926 km^{2})
  - Water: 0 sq mi (0 km^{2}) 0%
- Elevation: 249 ft (76 m)

Population (2020)
  - Total: 190
  - Density: 530/sq mi (210/km^{2})
- Time zone: UTC-8 (Pacific (PST))
  - Summer (DST): UTC-7 (PDT)
- GNIS feature ID: 2628748

Las Flores (Spanish for "The Flowers") is a census-designated place (CDP) in Tehama County, California, United States. Las Flores sits at an elevation of 249 feet (76 m). The 2020 United States census reported Las Flores's population was 190.

== History ==
Las Flores had its start in 1916 as a railroad community.

== Geography ==
According to the United States Census Bureau, the CDP covers an area of 0.4 square mile (0.9 km^{2}), all land.

== Demographics ==
Historical population
Census	Pop.	Note	%±
2010	1,066		—
2020	1,044		−2.1%
U.S. Decennial Census; 1860–1870 1880-1890; 1900 1910 1920; 1930 1940 1950; 1960 1970 1980; 1990 2000 2010

Las Flores first appeared as a census designated place in the 2010 U.S. census after the Gerber-Las Flores CDP was split into the Gerber CDP and Las Flores CDP, with additional area added.

The 2020 United States census reported that Las Flores had a population of 190. The population density was 530.7 inhabitants per square mile (204.9/km^{2}). The racial makeup of Las Flores was 96 (50.5%) White, 0 (0.0%) African American, 6 (3.2%) Native American, 2 (1.1%) Asian, 0 (0.0%) Pacific Islander, 62 (32.6%) from other races, and 24 (12.6%) from two or more races. Hispanic or Latino of any race were 106 persons (55.8%).

The whole population lived in households. There were 60 households, out of which 19 (31.7%) had children under the age of 18 living in them, 32 (53.3%) were married-couple households, 10 (16.7%) were cohabiting couple households, 8 (13.3%) had a female householder with no partner present, and 10 (16.7%) had a male householder with no partner present. 7 households (11.7%) were one person, and 6 (10.0%) were one person aged 65 or older. The average household size was 3.17. There were 44 families (73.3% of all households).

The age distribution was 51 people (26.8%) under the age of 18, 15 people (7.9%) aged 18 to 24, 40 people (21.1%) aged 25 to 44, 42 people (22.1%) aged 45 to 64, and 42 people (22.1%) who were 65 years of age or older. The median age was 39.4 years. There were 101 males and 89 females.

There were 78 housing units at an average density of 217.9 units per square mile (84.1 units/km^{2}), of which 60 (76.9%) were occupied. Of these, 47 (78.3%) were owner-occupied, and 13 (21.7%) were occupied by renters.
