= Gerber station =

Former train station in California, United States

Gerber, CA

General information
- Location: San Benito Avenue at Samson Avenue; Gerber, California 96035
- Coordinates: 40.0557°N 122.1525°W

History
- Opened: August 15, 1916
- Closed: March 1972 (passenger); May 24, 1972 (freight)
- Original company: Southern Pacific

Former services
Preceding station	Amtrak	Following station
Davis toward Los Angeles	Coast Starlight	Redding toward Seattle
Preceding station	Southern Pacific Railroad	Following station
Richfield toward Oakland Pier	Shasta Route via West Side Sacramento Valley	Proberta toward Portland
Tehama toward Oakland Pier	Shasta Route via East Side Sacramento Valley	Proberta toward Portland
Location

Gerber is a former railway station in Gerber, California. A former depot of the Southern Pacific, it was the junction of the company's two lines which traverse both the east and west sides of the Sacramento Valley to the south.

After the Southern Pacific yards in Red Bluff had become too small to handle the traffic on the Shasta Division, the company sought to expand. Prices for land adjacent to the facility in Red Bluff were set high, so SP acquired a new site to the south in the town of Gerber. A new station building was constructed, nearly twice as large as the one it replaced in Red Bluff, with a new crew quarters, roundhouse, and machine shops. Operations and employees were transferred to the new station on August 15, 1916. In 1928, Gerber was selected as the site for Southern Pacific's airport, meant as a base for the company's planned airline which would supplement passenger train services between California and Oregon. These plans did not come to fruition. Trains had ceased serving the station at night by 1966, causing SP to shut down evening operations that year. Gerber was an inaugural Amtrak Coast Starlight stop when the route started in 1971 (prior to the route receiving its named designation). Service did not last, however, with trains bypassing the station starting in March 1972. Southern Pacific went on to close the station a few months later on May 24, eliminating the switching point between Dunsmuir and Roseville.
