= Lake California, California =

Lake California
- census-designated place
- Location of Lake California in Tehama County, California.

- Position in California.
- Coordinates: 40°21′48″N 122°12′54″W
- Country: United States
- State: California
- County: Tehama

Area
  - Total: 6.644 sq mi (17.208 km^{2})
  - Land: 6.311 sq mi (16.345 km^{2})
  - Water: 0.333 sq mi (0.862 km^{2}) 5.01%
- Elevation: 597 ft (182 m)

Population (2020)
  - Total: 3,377
  - Density: 535.1/sq mi (206.6/km^{2})
- Time zone: UTC-8 (Pacific (PST))
  - Summer (DST): UTC-7 (PDT)
- GNIS feature ID: 2628747

Lake California is a census-designated place (CDP) in Tehama County, California, United States. Lake California sits at an elevation of 597 feet (182 m). The 2020 United States census reported Lake California's population was 3,377.

== Geography ==
According to the United States Census Bureau, the CDP covers an area of 6.6 square miles (17.2 km^{2}), of which 6.3 square miles (16.3 km^{2}) is land and 0.3 square mile (0.9 km^{2}) is (5.01%) water.

== Demographics ==
Historical population
Census	Pop.	Note	%±
2010	3,054		—
2020	3,377		10.6%
U.S. Decennial Census; 1860–1870 1880-1890; 1900 1910 1920; 1930 1940 1950; 1960 1970 1980; 1990 2000 2010

Lake California first appeared as a census designated place in the 2010 U.S. census.

=== 2020 census ===
As of the 2020 census, Lake California had a population of 3,377. The population density was 535.1 inhabitants per square mile (206.6/km^{2}). The census reported that 99.9% of the population lived in households, 4 people (0.1%) lived in non-institutionalized group quarters, and no one was institutionalized.

0.0% of residents lived in urban areas, while 100.0% lived in rural areas.

There were 1,268 households, out of which 33.5% included children under the age of 18. Of all households, 58.8% were married-couple households, 7.0% were cohabiting couple households, 20.6% had a female householder with no spouse or partner present, and 13.6% had a male householder with no spouse or partner present. About 19.8% of all households were made up of individuals, and 11.5% had someone living alone who was 65 years of age or older. The average household size was 2.66. There were 948 families (74.8% of all households).

The age distribution was 25.5% under the age of 18, 5.5% aged 18 to 24, 23.5% aged 25 to 44, 23.7% aged 45 to 64, and 21.8% aged 65 or older. The median age was 40.6 years. For every 100 females, there were 101.6 males, and for every 100 females age 18 and over, there were 96.0 males age 18 and over.

There were 1,374 housing units at an average density of 217.7 units per square mile (84.1 units/km^{2}), of which 1,268 (92.3%) were occupied and 7.7% were vacant. Of occupied units, 80.0% were owner-occupied and 20.0% were renter-occupied. The homeowner vacancy rate was 2.8%, and the rental vacancy rate was 5.9%.

Racial composition as of the 2020 census
Race	Number	Percent
White	2,758	81.7%
Black or African American	17	0.5%
American Indian and Alaska Native	67	2.0%
Asian	37	1.1%
Native Hawaiian and Other Pacific Islander	0	0.0%
Some other race	86	2.5%
Two or more races	412	12.2%
Hispanic or Latino (of any race)	374	11.1%

=== Demographic estimates ===
In 2023, the US Census Bureau estimated that the median household income was $95,278, and the per capita income was $36,014. About 4.7% of families and 12.0% of the population were below the poverty line.
