= Bend, California =

Bend
- census-designated place
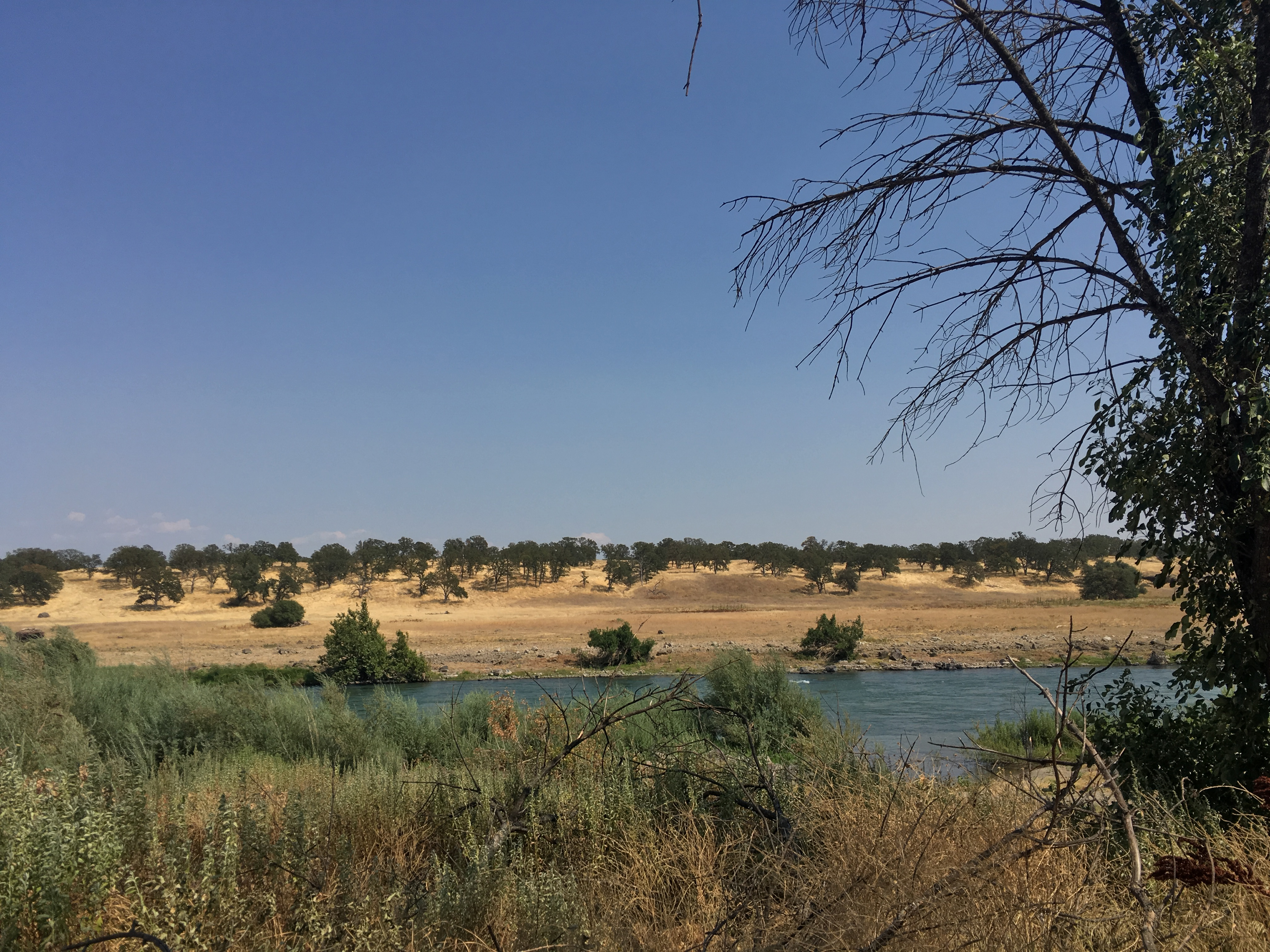
- A photograph of the Sacramento River as it passes through Bend, California.

- Location of Bend in Tehama County, California.

- Location within California
- Coordinates: 40°15′19″N 122°12′31″W
- Country: United States
- State: California
- County: Tehama

Area
  - Total: 3.17 sq mi (8.21 km^{2})
  - Land: 2.92 sq mi (7.55 km^{2})
  - Water: 0.25 sq mi (0.66 km^{2}) 8.07%
- Elevation: 335 ft (102 m)

Population (2020)
  - Total: 603
  - Density: 206.9/sq mi (79.89/km^{2})
- Time zone: UTC-8 (Pacific (PST))
  - Summer (DST): UTC-7 (PDT)
- ZIP code: 96080
- Area code: 530
- GNIS feature IDs: 1658034

Bend is a census-designated place in Tehama County, California, United States. Bend is located on the Sacramento River, 6 miles (9.7 km) north-northeast of Red Bluff. Bend had a post office from 1897 to 1935. The community was originally known as Horsethief Bend; the name was changed to Sander's Bend and later shortened to Bend. The community was named after a nearby meander in the Sacramento River. The population was 603 at the 2020 census.

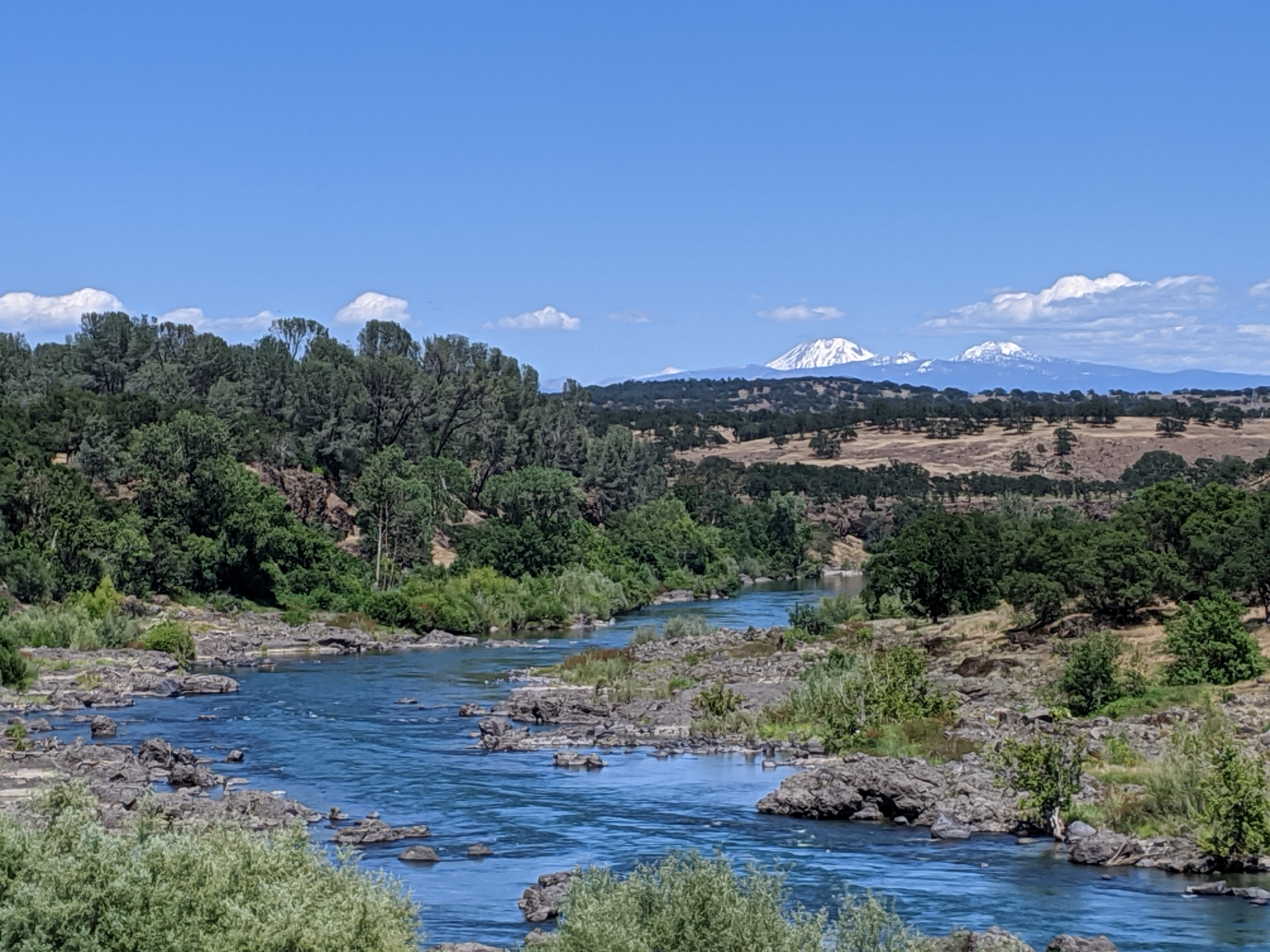

== Geography ==
According to the United States Census Bureau, the CDP covers an area of 3.1 square miles (8.2 km^{2}), of which 2.9 square miles (7.6 km^{2}) is land and 0.3 square mile (0.7 km^{2}) is (8.07%) water.

== Demographics ==
Historical population
| Census | Pop. | Note | %± |
|---|---|---|---|
| 2010 | 619 | | — |
| 2020 | 603 | | −2.6% |
U.S. Decennial Census; 1850–1870 1880-1890; 1900 1910 1920; 1930 1940 1950; 1960 1970 1980; 1990 2000 2010

=== 2020 census ===
As of the 2020 census, Bend had a population of 603. The population density was 206.9 inhabitants per square mile (79.9/km^{2}). The median age was 54.5 years. For every 100 females there were 90.2 males, and for every 100 females age 18 and over there were 90.9 males age 18 and over.

The age distribution was 20.2% under the age of 18, 5.1% aged 18 to 24, 15.8% aged 25 to 44, 29.5% aged 45 to 64, and 29.4% who were 65 years of age or older.

0.0% of residents lived in urban areas, while 100.0% lived in rural areas.

There were 260 households in Bend, of which 16.5% had children under the age of 18 living in them. Of all households, 53.1% were married-couple households, 3.8% were cohabiting couple households, 26.5% were households with a male householder and no spouse or partner present, and 16.5% were households with a female householder and no spouse or partner present. About 37.0% of all households were made up of individuals and 21.9% had someone living alone who was 65 years of age or older. The average household size was 2.32. There were 158 families (60.8% of all households).

There were 274 housing units at an average density of 94.0 units per square mile (36.3 units/km^{2}), of which 260 (94.9%) were occupied and 5.1% were vacant. Of the occupied units, 84.2% were owner-occupied, and 15.8% were occupied by renters. The homeowner vacancy rate was 0.0% and the rental vacancy rate was 10.9%.

Racial composition as of the 2020 census
| Race | Number | Percent |
|---|---|---|
| White | 469 | 77.8% |
| Black or African American | 3 | 0.5% |
| American Indian and Alaska Native | 11 | 1.8% |
| Asian | 11 | 1.8% |
| Native Hawaiian and Other Pacific Islander | 2 | 0.3% |
| Some other race | 19 | 3.2% |
| Two or more races | 88 | 14.6% |
| Hispanic or Latino (of any race) | 58 | 9.6% |

=== 2010 census ===
Bend first appeared as a census designated place in the 2010 U.S. census.
