= Proberta, California =

Proberta
- census-designated place
- Location within California Location within the United States
- Coordinates: 40°04′54″N 122°10′14″W
- Country: United States
- State: California
- County: Tehama

Area
  - Total: 1.431 sq mi (3.707 km^{2})
  - Land: 1.431 sq mi (3.707 km^{2})
  - Water: 0 sq mi (0 km^{2}) 0%
- Elevation: 253 ft (77 m)

Population (2020)
  - Total: 237
  - Density: 166/sq mi (63.9/km^{2})
- Time zone: UTC-8 (Pacific (PST))
  - Summer (DST): UTC-7 (PDT)
- ZIP code: 96078
- Area code: 530
- GNIS feature IDs: 231067; 2628780

Proberta is a census-designated place in Tehama County, California, United States. Proberta is 7.5 miles (12.1 km) south-southeast of Red Bluff. Proberta has a post office with ZIP code 96078. The population was 237 at the 2020 census.

== History ==
Proberta was laid out in 1886 by Edward Proberta, and named for him. A post office has been in operation at Proberta since 1888.

== Geography ==
According to the United States Census Bureau, the CDP covers an area of 1.4 square miles (3.7 km^{2}), all land.

=== Climate ===
According to the Köppen Climate Classification system, Proberta has a warm-summer Mediterranean climate, abbreviated "Csa" on climate maps.

== Demographics ==
Historical population
| Census | Pop. | Note | %± |
|---|---|---|---|
| 2010 | 237 | | — |
| 2020 | 237 | | 0.0% |
U.S. Decennial Census; 1860–1870 1880-1890; 1900 1910 1920; 1930 1940 1950; 1960 1970 1980; 1990 2000 2010

Proberta first appeared as a census designated place in the 2010 U.S. census.

The 2020 United States census reported that Proberta had a population of 237. The population density was 165.6 inhabitants per square mile (63.9/km^{2}). The racial makeup of Proberta was 155 (65.4%) White, 0 (0.0%) African American, 9 (3.8%) Native American, 0 (0.0%) Asian, 2 (0.8%) Pacific Islander, 48 (20.3%) from other races, and 23 (9.7%) from two or more races. Hispanic or Latino of any race were 90 persons (38.0%).

The whole population lived in households. There were 89 households, out of which 20 (22.5%) had children under the age of 18 living in them, 52 (58.4%) were married-couple households, 6 (6.7%) were cohabiting couple households, 16 (18.0%) had a female householder with no partner present, and 15 (16.9%) had a male householder with no partner present. 13 households (14.6%) were one person, and 7 (7.9%) were one person aged 65 or older. The average household size was 2.66. There were 67 families (75.3% of all households).

The age distribution was 62 people (26.2%) under the age of 18, 32 people (13.5%) aged 18 to 24, 47 people (19.8%) aged 25 to 44, 52 people (21.9%) aged 45 to 64, and 44 people (18.6%) who were 65 years of age or older. The median age was 36.5 years. For every 100 females, there were 94.3 males.

There were 89 housing units at an average density of 62.2 units per square mile (24.0 units/km^{2}), which were all occupied, 64 (71.9%) by homeowners, and 25 (28.1%) by renters.
