= Richfield, California =

Richfield
- census-designated place
- Position in California.
- Coordinates: 39°58′27″N 122°10′26″W
- Country: United States
- State: California
- County: Tehama

Area
  - Total: 0.547 sq mi (1.417 km^{2})
  - Land: 0.547 sq mi (1.417 km^{2})
  - Water: 0 sq mi (0 km^{2}) 0%
- Elevation: 269 ft (82 m)

Population (2020)
  - Total: 309
  - Density: 565/sq mi (218/km^{2})
- Time zone: UTC-8 (Pacific (PST))
  - Summer (DST): UTC-7 (PDT)
- ZIP code: 96021
- Area code: 530
- GNIS feature ID: 2628783

Richfield is a census-designated place (CDP) in Tehama County, California, United States. Richfield sits at an elevation of 269 feet (82 m). The 2020 United States census reported Richfield's population was 309.

== History ==
Richfield was founded ca. 1910. A post office was established at Richfield in 1912, and remained in operation until 1964. The community was named for the fertility of their soil.

== Geography ==
According to the United States Census Bureau, the CDP covers an area of 0.55 square mile (1.42 km^{2}), all land.

== Demographics ==
Historical population
Census	Pop.	Note	%±
2010	306		—
2020	309		1.0%
U.S. Decennial Census; 1860–1870 1880-1890; 1900 1910 1920; 1930 1940 1950; 1960 1970 1980; 1990 2000 2010

Richfield first appeared as a census designated place in the 2010 U.S. census.

The 2020 United States census reported that Richfield had a population of 309. The population density was 564.9 inhabitants per square mile (218.1/km^{2}). The racial makeup of Richfield was 218 (70.6%) White, 0 (0.0%) African American, 4 (1.3%) Native American, 2 (0.6%) Asian, 1 (0.3%) Pacific Islander, 19 (6.1%) from other races, and 65 (21.0%) from two or more races. Hispanic or Latino of any race were 69 persons (22.3%).

The whole population lived in households. There were 107 households, out of which 38 (35.5%) had children under the age of 18 living in them, 42 (39.3%) were married-couple households, 9 (8.4%) were cohabiting couple households, 29 (27.1%) had a female householder with no partner present, and 27 (25.2%) had a male householder with no partner present. 31 households (29.0%) were one person, and 21 (19.6%) were one person aged 65 or older. The average household size was 2.89. There were 69 families (64.5% of all households).

The age distribution was 95 people (30.7%) under the age of 18, 15 people (4.9%) aged 18 to 24, 86 people (27.8%) aged 25 to 44, 71 people (23.0%) aged 45 to 64, and 42 people (13.6%) who were 65 years of age or older. The median age was 37.2 years. For every 100 females, there were 90.7 males.

There were 118 housing units at an average density of 215.7 units per square mile (83.3 units/km^{2}), of which 107 (90.7%) were occupied. Of these, 91 (85.0%) were owner-occupied, and 16 (15.0%) were occupied by renters.

== Businesses ==
This tiny town is bounded by four businesses. Eco-Shell, Inc., which was established in 1990 as an industrial walnut grinding facility south of Richfield. Sierra Pacific Industries operates Richfield Millwork to the north. Richfield Feed and Supply operates on Highway 99 to the west, and Richfield School House Market is within the town to the east.
