= Gerber, California =

Gerber
- census-designated place
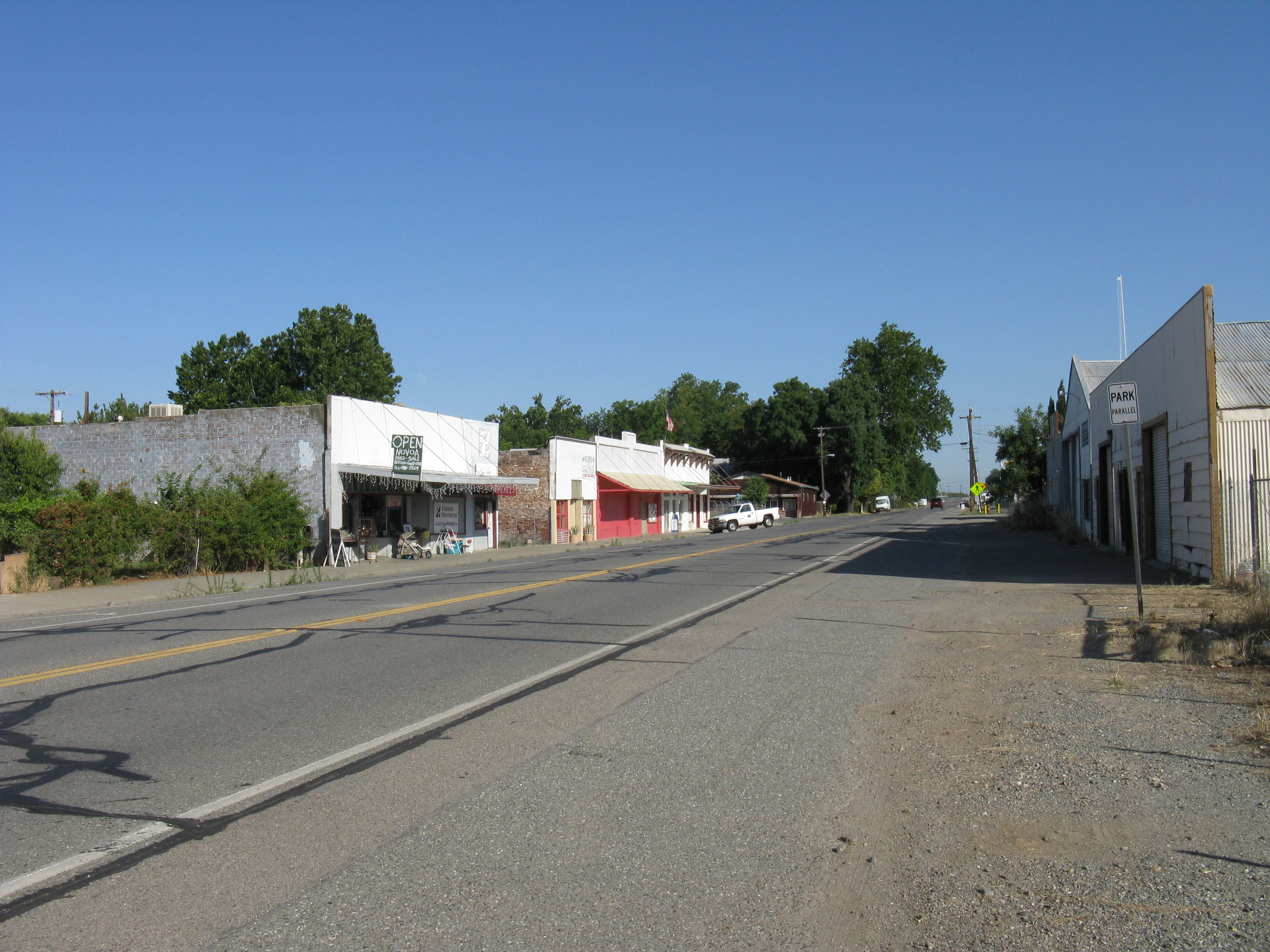
- Main Street

- Location of Gerber in Tehama County, California.

- Position in California.
- Coordinates: 40°03′36″N 122°09′00″W
- Country: United States
- State: California
- County: Tehama

Area
  - Total: 0.927 sq mi (2.401 km^{2})
  - Land: 0.927 sq mi (2.401 km^{2})
  - Water: 0 sq mi (0 km^{2}) 0%
- Elevation: 226 ft (69 m)

Population (2020)
  - Total: 1,044
  - Density: 1,126/sq mi (434.8/km^{2})
- Time zone: UTC-8 (Pacific (PST))
  - Summer (DST): UTC-7 (PDT)
- GNIS feature ID: 2628801

Gerber is a census-designated place (CDP) in Tehama County, California, United States. Gerber sits at an elevation of 226 feet (69 m). The 2020 United States census reported Gerber's population was 1,044.

== History ==
Gerber was platted in 1910, and named after the Gerber family, original owners of the town site. A post office has been in operation at Gerber since 1916.

In the early years, Gerber was a center supporting ranchers and alfalfa growers.

Between 1916 and 1965, Gerber was the location of a division point on the Southern Pacific Railroad between the Sacramento and Shasta Divisions. Situated two miles north of the junction of the West Valley Line to Davis and the East Valley Line to Sacramento via Chico and Marysville, facilities included steam locomotive fueling, repair and crew-change. There were also livestock yards and an icing plant for refrigerator cars. Following the 1955 completion of the railroad's phasing in of diesel locomotives as a replacement to steam, operations at Gerber were gradually curtailed over the following decade and eventually closed down.

Passenger service continued until 1972 when Amtrak's Coast Starlight discontinued Gerber station as a stop.

== Geography ==
According to the United States Census Bureau, the CDP covers an area of 0.9 square mile (2.4 km^{2}), all land.

== Demographics ==
Historical population
Census	Pop.	Note	%±
2010	1,066		—
2020	1,044		−2.1%
U.S. Decennial Census; 1860–1870 1880-1890; 1900 1910 1920; 1930 1940 1950; 1960 1970 1980; 1990 2000 2010

=== 2020 census ===
As of the 2020 census, Gerber had a population of 1,044. The population density was 1,126.2 inhabitants per square mile (434.8/km^{2}). The median age was 32.4 years. The age distribution was 297 people (28.4%) under age 18, 117 people (11.2%) aged 18 to 24, 259 people (24.8%) aged 25 to 44, 253 people (24.2%) aged 45 to 64, and 118 people (11.3%) aged 65 or older. For every 100 females, there were 99.2 males, and for every 100 females age 18 and over, there were 92.5 males age 18 and over.

0.0% of residents lived in urban areas, while 100.0% lived in rural areas.

The whole population lived in households. There were 359 households, of which 132 (36.8%) had children under the age of 18 living in them. Of all households, 160 (44.6%) were married-couple households, 21 (5.8%) were cohabiting couple households, 68 (18.9%) had a male householder with no partner present, and 110 (30.6%) had a female householder with no partner present. 78 households (21.7%) were one person, and 42 (11.7%) were one person aged 65 or older. The average household size was 2.91. There were 253 families (70.5% of all households).

There were 406 housing units at an average density of 438.0 units per square mile (169.1 units/km^{2}), of which 359 (88.4%) were occupied. Of the occupied units, 192 (53.5%) were owner-occupied and 167 (46.5%) were occupied by renters. 11.6% of housing units were vacant. The homeowner vacancy rate was 9.0% and the rental vacancy rate was 7.2%.

Racial composition as of the 2020 census
Race	Number	Percent
White	478	45.8%
Black or African American	9	0.9%
American Indian and Alaska Native	50	4.8%
Asian	9	0.9%
Native Hawaiian and Other Pacific Islander	4	0.4%
Some other race	392	37.5%
Two or more races	102	9.8%
Hispanic or Latino (of any race)	582	55.7%

=== 2010 census ===
Gerber first appeared as a census designated place in the 2010 census after the Gerber-Las Flores CDP was split into the Gerber CDP and Las Flores CDP.
