= Diseño =

Hand-drawn map of pre-U.S. statehood land grant

A diseño is a hand-drawn map of a Spanish or Mexico land grant that was submitted to the U.S. government indicating the extent of a land grant as understood by the grantees. An expediente is a written description of the grant. These documents were used during the U.S. land-patent process that began when Mexican Alta California became the U.S. state of California in 1850. Diseños are distinct from later maps produced by U.S. surveyors within the extant American rectangular survey system.

Diseños may have missing or poorly described coastal features because cattlemen who ran the ranchos generally did not make use of the shoreline or own boats.

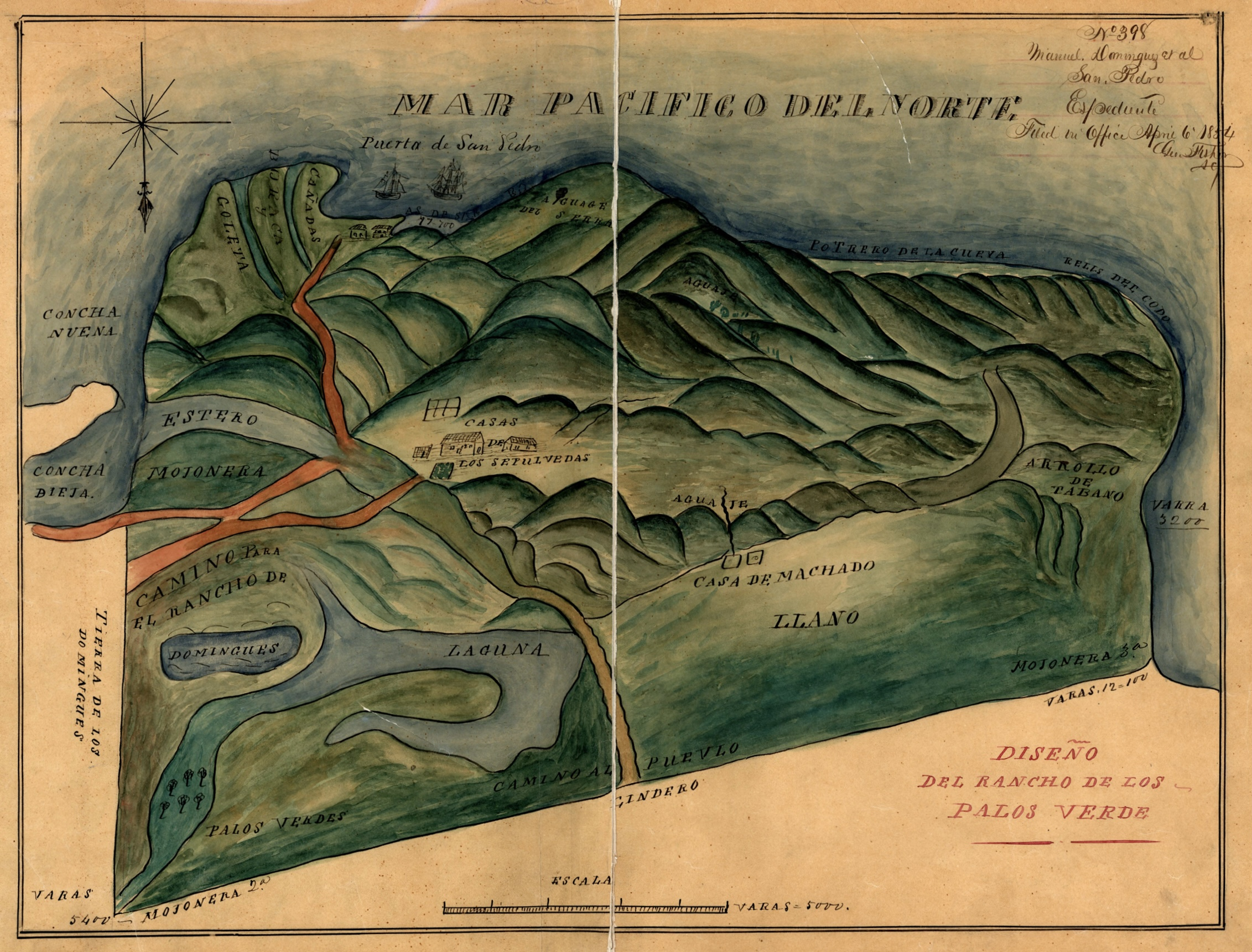
This diseño of Rancho de Los Palos Verdes, originally part of Rancho San Pedro, was submitted to the U.S. General Land Office in 1852

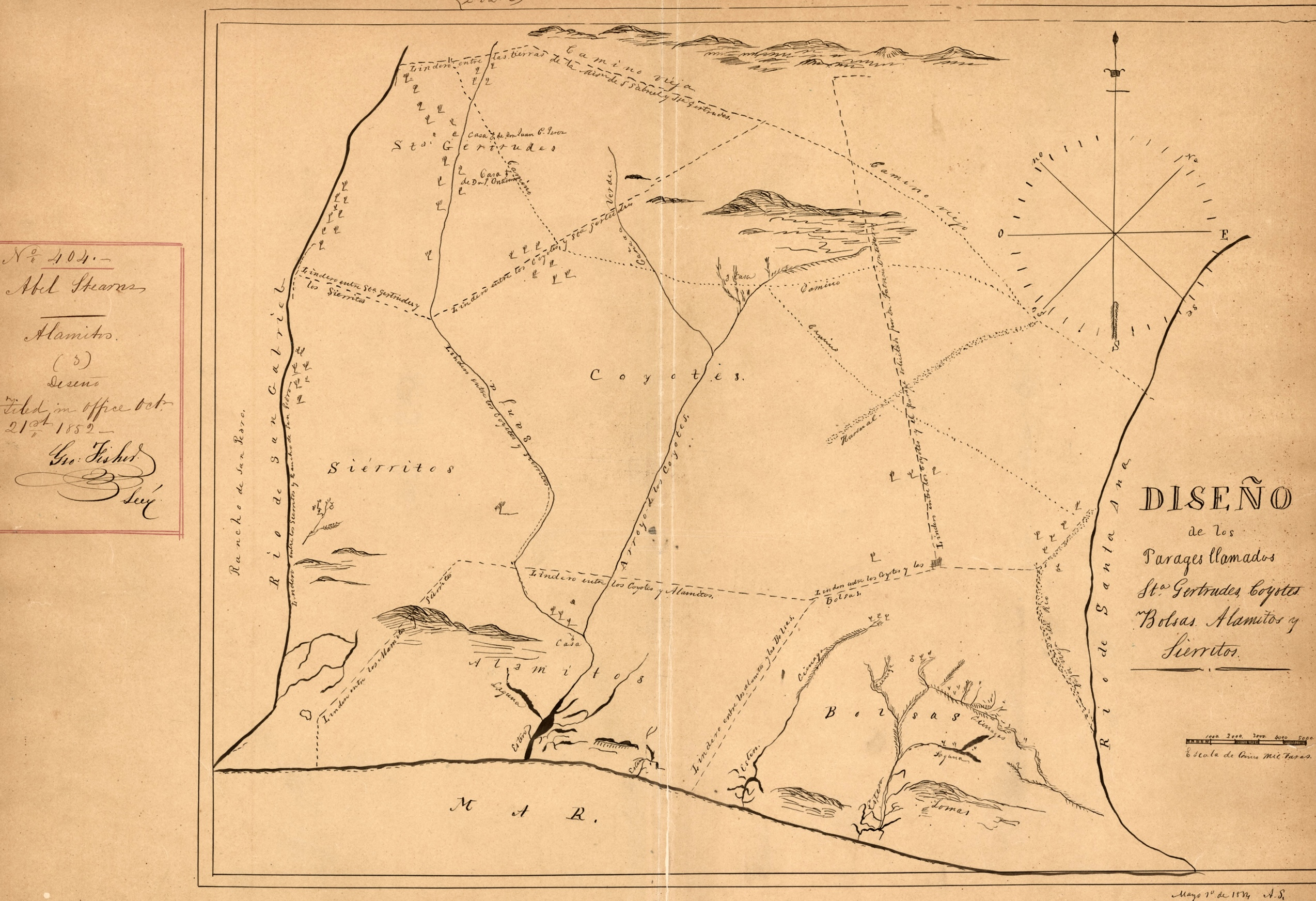
Diseño Del Rancho Los Alamitos, Los Cerritos, Santa Gertrudis, Coyotes, Bolsas, 1852
