= Tehama County, California =

County in California, United States

Coordinates: 40.13°N 122.23°W

Tehama County
- County
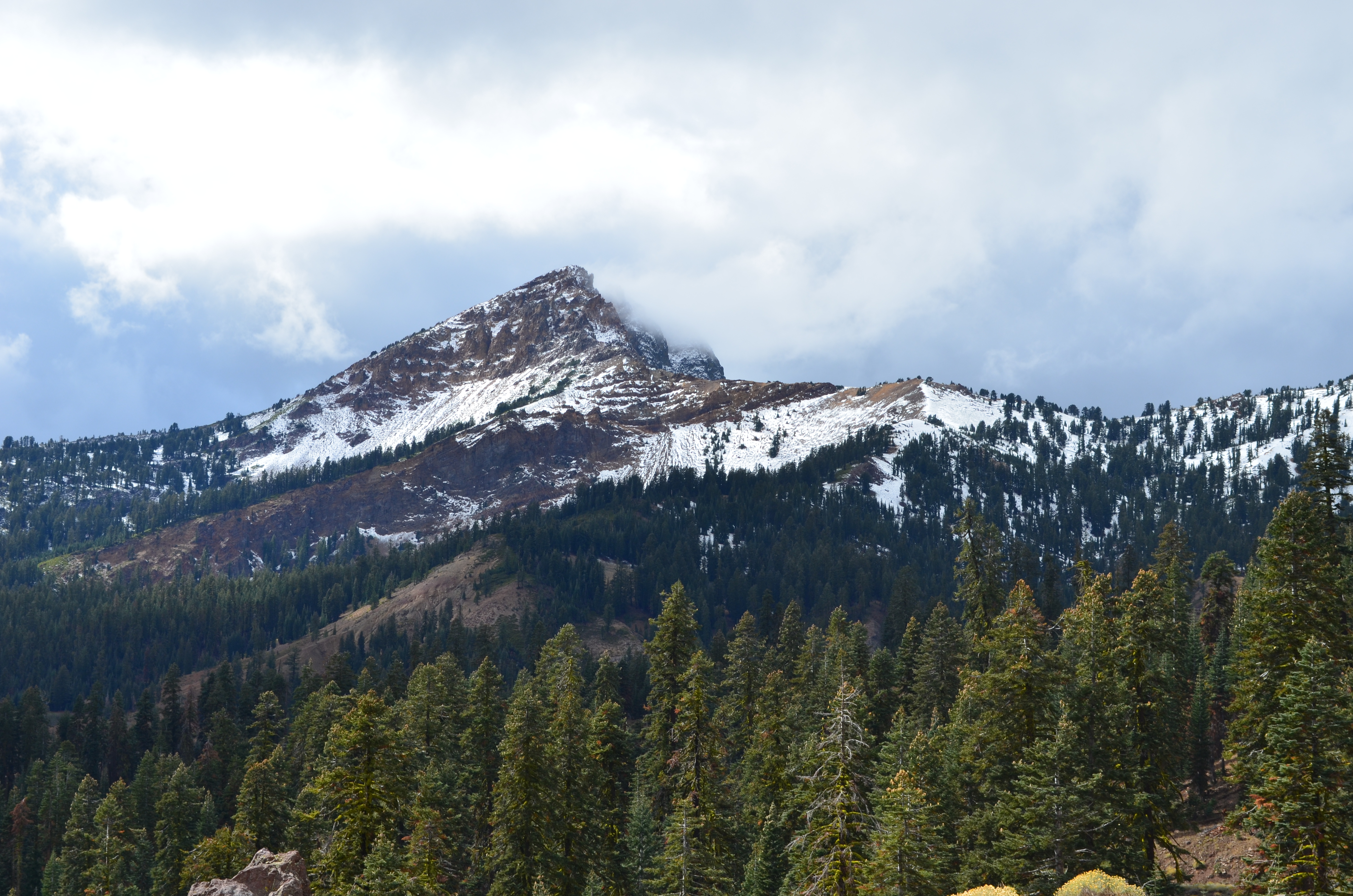
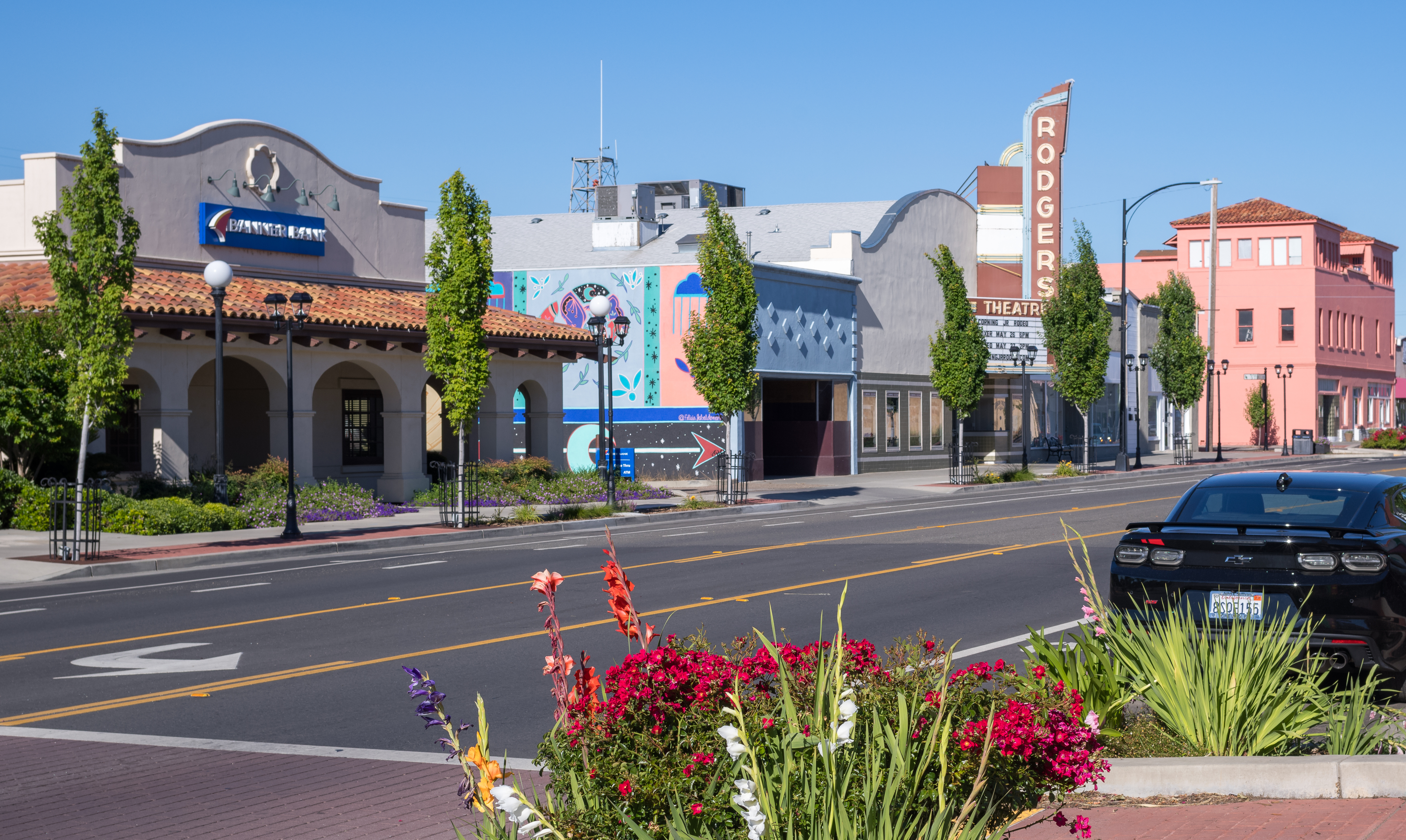
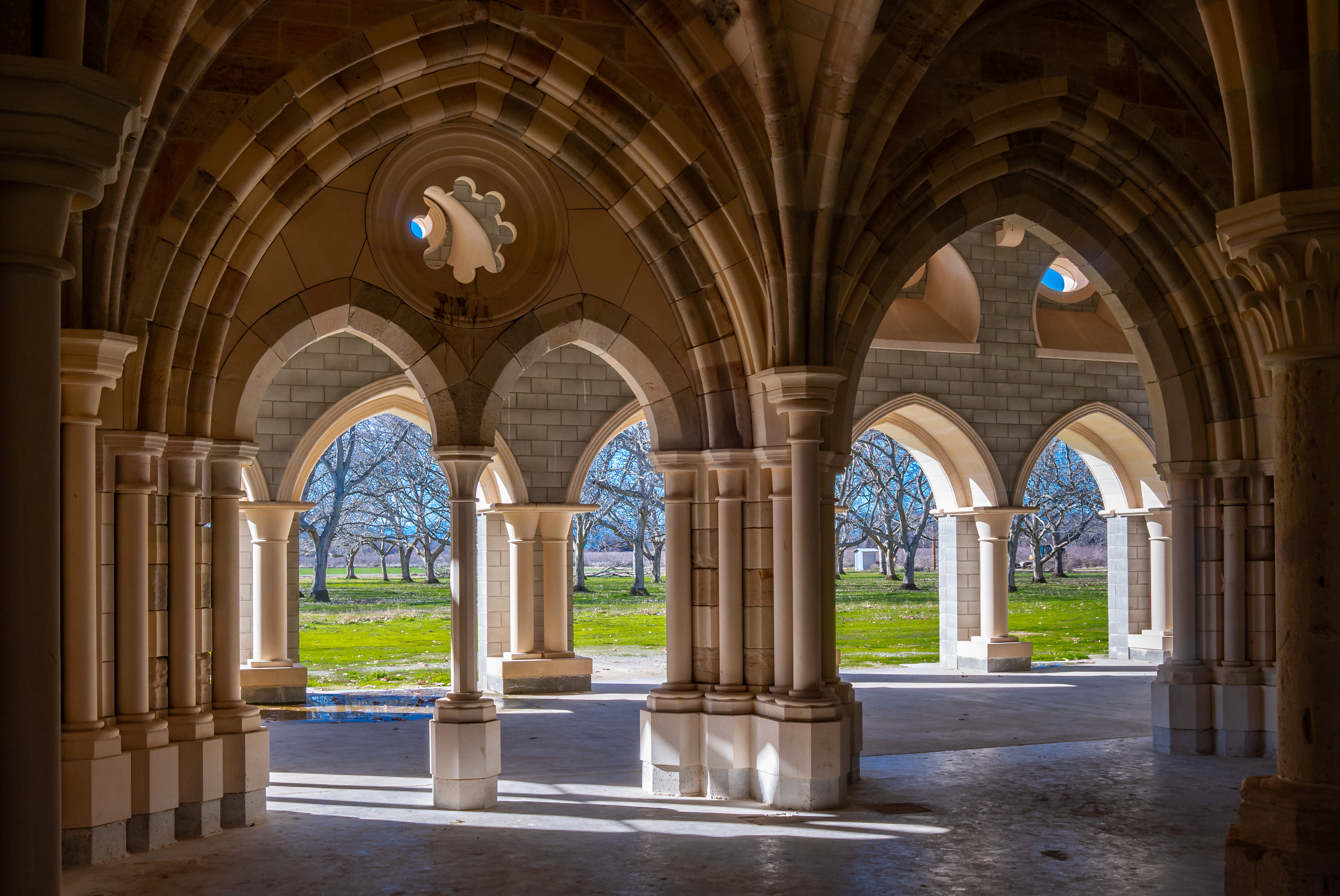
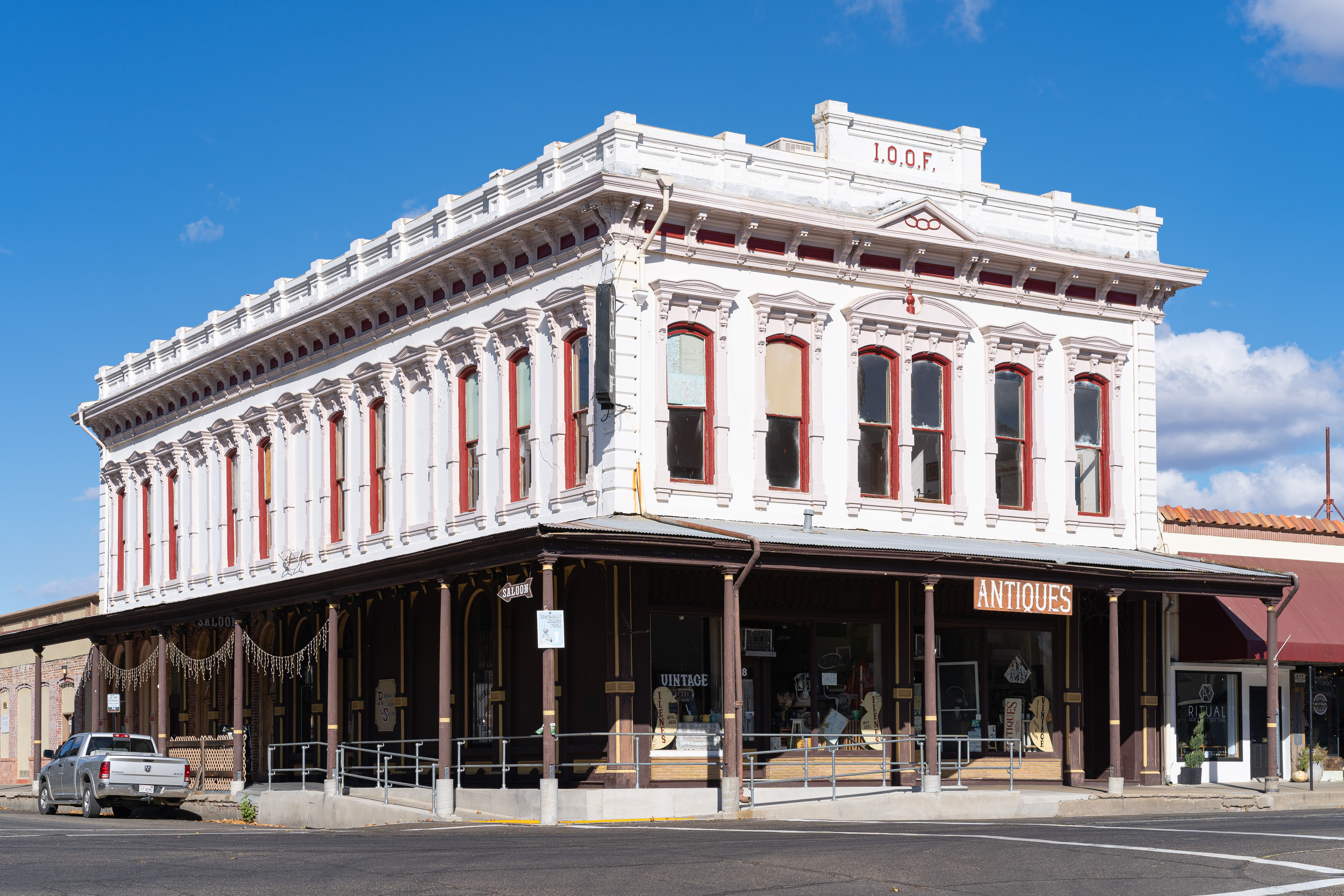
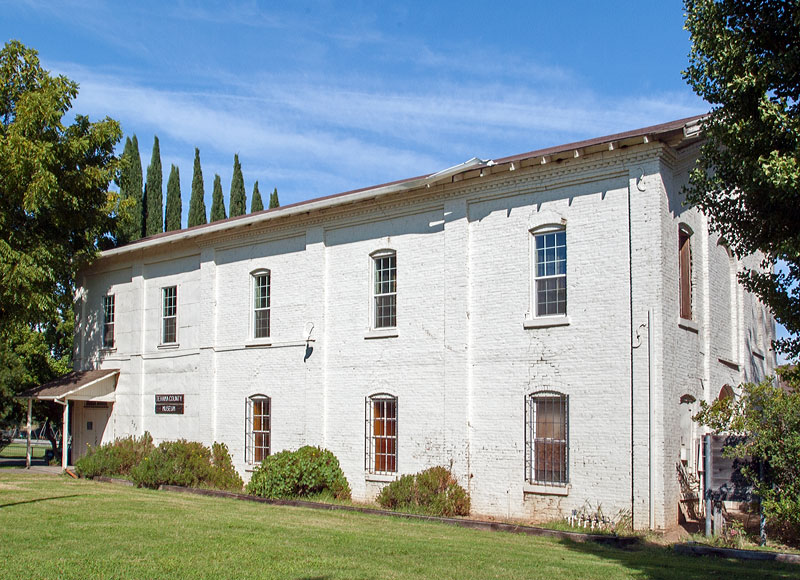
- Mount Tehama and Lassen Volcanic Park Corning Vina Red Bluff Tehama

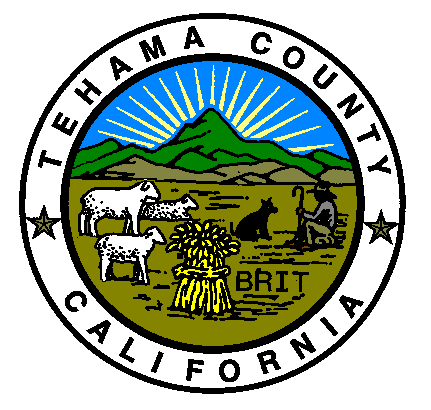
- Seal
- Interactive map of Tehama County
- Location in the state of California
- Country: United States
- State: California
- Region: Shasta Cascade
- Incorporated: April 9, 1856
- County seat: Red Bluff
- Largest city: Red Bluff

Government
  - Type: Council–Administrator
  - Chair: Tom Walker
  - Vice Chair: Greg Jones
  - Board of Supervisors: Supervisors: Robert Burroughs; Tom Walker; Steve Zane; Matt Hansen; Greg Jones
  - Chief Administrator: Gabriel Hydrick

Area
  - Total: 2,962 sq mi (7,670 km^{2})
  - Land: 2,950 sq mi (7,600 km^{2})
  - Water: 12 sq mi (31 km^{2})
- Highest elevation: 9,239 ft (2,816 m)

Population (2020)
  - Total: 65,829
  - Estimate (2025): 64,665 ▼
  - Density: 22.3/sq mi (8.62/km^{2})

GDP
  - Total: $2.517 billion (2022)
- Time zone: UTC-8 (Pacific Standard Time)
  - Summer (DST): UTC-7 (Pacific Daylight Time)
- Congressional district: 1st
- Website: www.co.tehama.ca.us

Tehama County (/təˈheɪmə/ tə-HAY-mə) is a county located in the northern part of the U.S. state of California. As of the 2020 census, the population was 65,829. The county seat and largest city is Red Bluff. Tehama County comprises the Red Bluff, California micropolitan statistical area, which is also included in the Redding-Red Bluff, California combined statistical area. The county is bisected by the Sacramento River.

== Etymology ==
The county is named for the City of Tehama. Tehama is most commonly believed to be derived from the Wintun word for "high water". Others definitions of native origin that have been proposed such as "low land", "salmon", "mother nature" or "shallow". A less accepted theory proposes the names origin is tejamanil, shingle in Spanish.

== History ==
Tehama County was formed from parts of Butte, Colusa, and Shasta Counties in 1856.

The first permanent nonindigenous settlers in the area that is now Tehama County were Robert Hasty Thomes, Albert Gallatin Toomes, William George Chard, and Job Francis Dye. The four men were each given land grants by the government of Mexico in 1844. Thomes received Rancho Saucos, Toomes received Rancho Rio de los Molinos, Chard received Rancho Las Flores, and Dye received Rancho Primer Cañon o Rio de Los Berrendos. Later in the same year Josiah Belden received Rancho Barranca Colorado.

Famous early figures include Kit Carson, who took part in a fight that gave name to Bloody Island and Battle Creek, Jedediah Smith, John C. Fremont, and William B. Ide, the first and only president of the California Republic.

The history of Tehama County includes multiple Chinatowns with some of its most distinguishable townsmen attending annual Chinese and American banquets, that merged the two cultures together. The deep bonds formed would culminate into a powerful petition by 20 influential leaders in support of the Chew family, who were detained at Angel Island in 1916, proving that Tehama County valued the Chinese community. This single act of kindness set the stage for a 20th-century Chinese American pioneer to be born, Dr. Kenneth Kendall Chew, and his research in aquaculture would change the world. Historically, Red Bluff has been plagued with tunnel and expulsion folklore including untrue incidents such as an 1886 torching of Red Bluff's Chinatown by alleged anti-Coolie league arsonists. The January 29, 1886, edition of The Daily Alta detailed 'The Anti-Coolie Move' held a meeting that was convened in the town of Tehama, and due to prominent White merchants, they deemed the movement as a public nuisance and as a result avoided any of its Chinese residence from being forced to relocate, which was an estimated 2,000 Chinese people in and around Vina. Secret daily anti-Chinese caucuses continued their failed attempts in Red Bluff until their agitations died down.

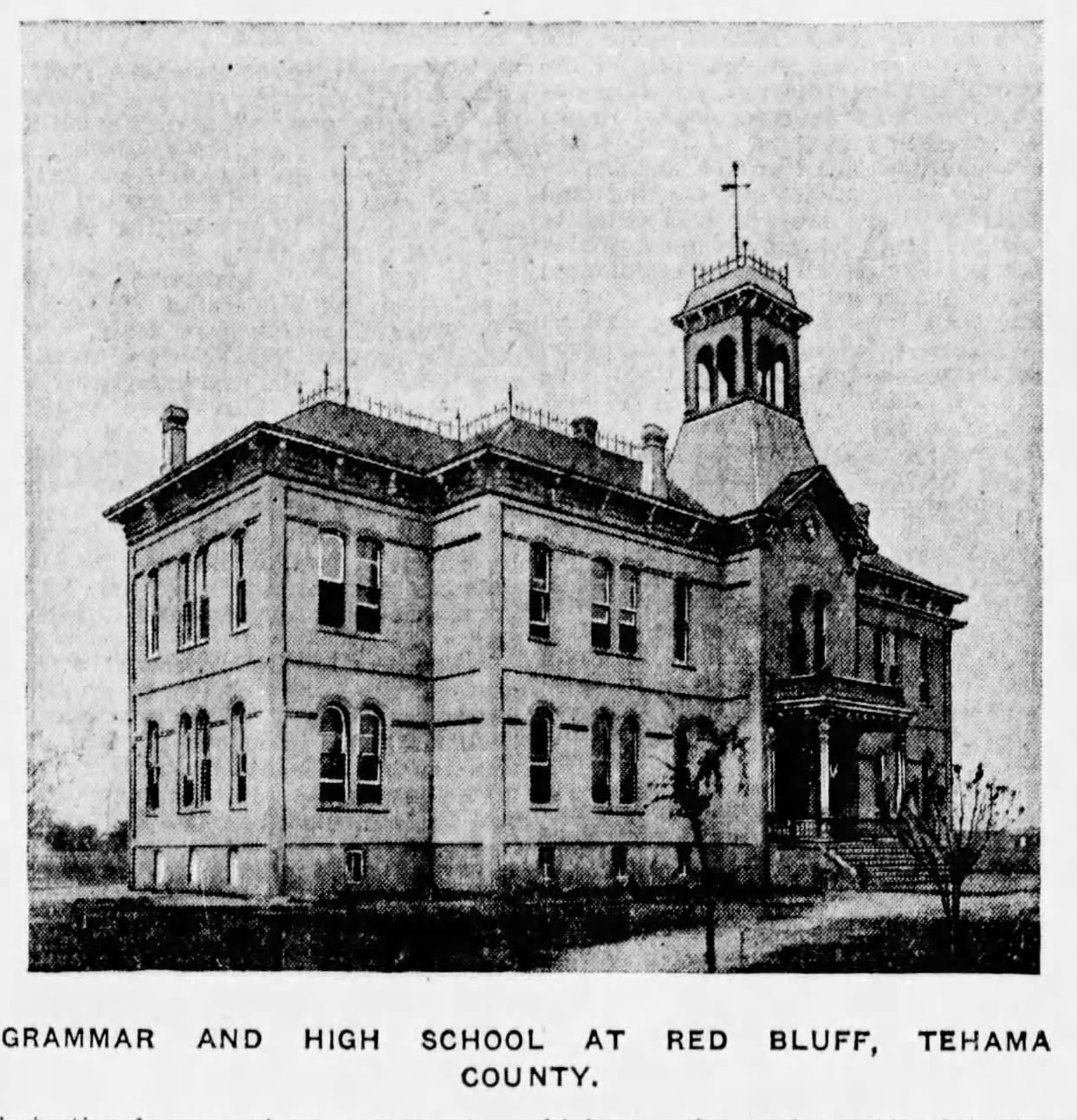
School at Red Bluff, 1902

== Geography ==
According to the United States Census Bureau, the county has a total area of 2,962 square miles (7,670 km^{2}), of which 2,950 square miles (7,600 km^{2}) is land and 12 square miles (31 km^{2}) (0.4%) is water. Watercourses in Tehama County include Dye Creek and Payne's Creek. The county is intersected by Sacramento River. A small part of Lassen Volcanic National Park extends into the northeast corner of the county. The highest point of the county is Brokeoff Mountain (9,235 feet).

=== Adjacent counties ===
- Shasta County - north
- Plumas County - northeast
- Butte County - east
- Glenn County - south
- Mendocino County - southwest
- Trinity County - west

=== National protected areas ===
- Lassen National Forest (part)
- Lassen Volcanic National Park (part)
- Mendocino National Forest (part)
- Sacramento River National Wildlife Refuge (part)
- Shasta–Trinity National Forest (part)

== Transportation ==
=== Major highways ===
- Interstate 5
- State Route 32
- State Route 36
- State Route 89
- State Route 99
- State Route 172

=== Public transportation ===
Tehama Rural Area Express (TRAX) operates local service in Red Bluff, with service to Los Molinos and Corning. Greyhound and FlixBus buses stop in Red Bluff.

The Shasta Regional Transportation Agency has proposed a weekday commuter bus to/from Red Bluff and the Sacramento Valley Station, following a route similar to the twice daily Amtrak Thruway 3.

=== Airports ===
Red Bluff Municipal Airport and Corning Municipal Airport are two general aviation airports.

== Crime ==
The following table includes the number of incidents reported and the rate per 1,000 persons for each type of offense.

Population and crime rates
Population	62,985	
Violent crime	387	6.14
Homicide	3	0.05
Forcible rape	9	0.14
Robbery	28	0.44
Aggravated assault	347	5.51
Property crime	725	11.51
Burglary	400	6.35
Larceny-theft (Note: Only larceny-theft cases involving property over $400 in value are reported as property crimes.)	808	12.83
Motor vehicle theft	136	2.16
Arson	33	0.52

=== Cities by population and crime rates ===
Cities by population and crime rates
City	Population	Violent crimes	Violent crime rate per 1,000 persons	Property crimes	Property crime rate per 1,000 persons
Corning	7,751	51	6.58	281	36.25
Red Bluff	14,236	112	7.87	811	56.97

== Demographics ==
Historical population
Census	Pop.	Note	%±
1860	4,044		—
1870	3,587		−11.3%
1880	9,301		159.3%
1890	9,916		6.6%
1900	10,996		10.9%
1910	11,401		3.7%
1920	12,882		13.0%
1930	13,866		7.6%
1940	14,316		3.2%
1950	19,276		34.6%
1960	25,305		31.3%
1970	29,517		16.6%
1980	38,888		31.7%
1990	49,625		27.6%
2000	56,039		12.9%
2010	63,463		13.2%
2020	65,829		3.7%
2025 (est.)	64,665	▼	−1.8%
U.S. Decennial Census; 1790–1960 1900–1990; 1990–2000 2010 2020

=== 2020 census ===
As of the 2020 census, the county had a population of 65,829 and a median age of 40.4 years. 24.3% of residents were under the age of 18 and 20.0% were 65 years of age or older. For every 100 females there were 99.5 males, and for every 100 females age 18 and over there were 97.5 males.

The racial makeup of the county was 68.2% White, 0.6% Black or African American, 2.9% American Indian and Alaska Native, 1.6% Asian, 0.2% Native Hawaiian and Pacific Islander, 14.6% from some other race, and 11.9% from two or more races. Hispanic or Latino residents of any race comprised 27.2% of the population.

43.0% of residents lived in urban areas, while 57.0% lived in rural areas.

There were 24,910 households in the county, of which 31.5% had children under the age of 18 living with them and 26.2% had a female householder with no spouse or partner present. About 25.7% of all households were made up of individuals and 13.3% had someone living alone who was 65 years of age or older.

There were 27,341 housing units, of which 8.9% were vacant. Among occupied housing units, 64.8% were owner-occupied and 35.2% were renter-occupied. The homeowner vacancy rate was 1.9% and the rental vacancy rate was 4.7%.

=== Racial and ethnic composition ===
Tehama County, California – Racial and ethnic composition Note: the US Census treats Hispanic/Latino as an ethnic category. This table excludes Latinos from the racial categories and assigns them to a separate category. Hispanics/Latinos may be of any race.
Race / Ethnicity (NH = Non-Hispanic)	Pop 1980	Pop 1990	Pop 2000	Pop 2010	Pop 2020	% 1980	% 1990	% 2000	% 2010	% 2020
White alone (NH)	35,875	43,049	43,972	45,603	41,340	92.25%	86.75%	78.47%	71.86%	62.80%
Black or African American alone (NH)	58	246	279	349	391	0.15%	0.50%	0.50%	0.55%	0.59%
Native American or Alaska Native alone (NH)	603	849	1,008	1,205	1,167	1.55%	1.71%	1.80%	1.90%	1.77%
Asian alone (NH)	191	325	423	625	985	0.49%	0.65%	0.75%	0.98%	1.50%
Native Hawaiian or Pacific Islander alone (NH)	x	x	48	64	96	x	x	0.09%	0.10%	0.15%
Other race alone (NH)	34	32	109	67	324	0.09%	0.06%	0.19%	0.11%	0.49%
Mixed race or Multiracial (NH)	x	x	1,329	1,644	3,588	x	x	2.37%	2.59%	5.45%
Hispanic or Latino (any race)	2,127	5,124	8,871	13,906	17,938	5.47%	10.33%	15.83%	21.91%	27.25%
Total	38,888	49,625	56,039	63,463	65,829	100.00%	100.00%	100.00%	100.00%	100.00%

=== American Community Survey 2025 data ===
The United States Census Bureau estimated that in 2025, Tehama County’s population was 64.665. It was also estimated that the county's population was 59,60% Non-Hispanic White, 31,54% Hispanic or Latino, 0,82% Non-Hispanic Black, 1,69% Asian, 1,73% Native American, 0,18% Pacific Islander, and 4,43% Multiracial.

Total	Population	Percentage
Non-Hispanic White	38.542	59,60%
Hispanic or Latino	20.397	31,54%
Non-Hispanic Black	532	0,82%
Asian	1.095	1,69%
Native American	1.121	1,73%
Pacific Islander	114	0,18%
Non-Hispanic Multiracial	2.864	4,43%

=== 2010 Census ===
The 2010 United States census reported that Tehama County had a population of 63,463. The racial makeup of Tehama County was 51,721 (81.5%) White, 406 (0.6%) African American, 1,644 (2.6%) Native American, 656 (1.0%) Asian, 76 (0.1%) Pacific Islander, 6,258 (9.9%) from other races, and 2,702 (4.3%) from two or more races. Hispanic or Latino of any race were 13,906 persons (21.9%).

Population reported at 2010 United States census
The County	Total; Population	White	African; American	Native; American	Asian	Pacific; Islander	other races	two or more races	Hispanic or Latino (of any race)
Tehama County	63,463	51,721	406	1,644	656	76	6,258	2,702	13,906
Incorporated cities and towns	Total; Population	White	African; American	Native; American	Asian	Pacific; Islander	other races	two or more races	Hispanic or Latino (of any race)
Corning	7,663	5,510	44	201	82	11	1,496	319	3,271
Red Bluff	14,076	11,366	128	438	187	16	1,168	773	3,037
Tehama	418	346	6	23	1	0	27	15	57
Census-designated places	Total; Population	White	African; American	Native; American	Asian	Pacific; Islander	other races	two or more races	Hispanic or Latino (of any race)
Bend	619	570	4	15	3	0	14	13	48
Flournoy	101	90	0	1	3	2	4	1	9
Gerber	1,060	575	6	55	8	0	371	45	526
Lake California	3,054	2,751	11	81	31	6	55	119	251
Las Flores	187	127	0	5	0	0	41	14	72
Los Molinos	2,037	1,581	0	39	7	2	321	87	537
Manton	347	312	0	20	1	0	7	7	35
Mineral	123	115	0	1	1	0	1	5	4
Paskenta	112	95	0	0	0	0	8	9	19
Paynes Creek	57	51	0	2	0	0	1	3	7
Proberta	267	174	0	7	1	1	76	8	91
Rancho Tehama	1,485	1,181	21	52	21	5	102	103	214
Richfield	306	264	0	4	0	0	35	3	65
Vina	237	195	1	7	2	0	20	12	42
Other unincorporated areas	Total; Population	White	African; American	Native; American	Asian	Pacific; Islander	other races	two or more races	Hispanic or Latino (of any race)
All others not CDPs (combined)	31,314	26,418	185	693	308	33	2,511	1,166	5,621

=== 2000 Census ===
As of the census of 2000, there were 56,039 people, 21,013 households, and 14,898 families residing in the county. The population density was 19 people per square mile (7.3 people/km^{2}). There were 23,547 housing units at an average density of 8 units per square mile (3.1 units/km^{2}). The racial makeup of the county was 84.8% White, 0.6% Black or African American, 2.1% Native American, 0.8% Asian, 0.1% Pacific Islander, 8.3% from other races, and 3.4% from two or more races. 15.8% of the population were Hispanic or Latino of any race. 14.4% were of German, 11.0% English, 9.6% Irish and 9.5% American ancestry according to the 2000 United States census. 86.0% spoke English and 13.0% Spanish as their first language.

There were 21,013 households, out of which 32.9% had children under the age of 18 living with them, 54.6% were married couples living together, 11.6% had a female householder with no husband present, and 29.1% were non-families. 24.0% of all households were made up of individuals, and 11.5% had someone living alone who was 65 years of age or older. The average household size was 2.62 and the average family size was 3.08.

In the county, the population was spread out, with 27.4% under the age of 18, 7.8% from 18 to 24, 25.7% from 25 to 44, 23.2% from 45 to 64, and 15.9% who were 65 years of age or older. The median age was 38 years. For every 100 females there were 97.7 males. For every 100 females age 18 and over, there were 95.0 males.

The median income for a household in the county was $31,206, and the median income for a family was $37,277. Males had a median income of $30,872 versus $22,864 for females. The per capita income for the county was $15,793. About 13.0% of families and 17.3% of the population were below the poverty line, including 24.0% of those under age 18 and 9.2% of those age 65 or over.

== Politics ==
=== Voter registration statistics ===
Population and registered voters
Total population	62,985	
Registered voters (Note: Percentage of registered voters with respect to total population. Percentages of party members with respect to registered voters follow.)	30,485	48.4%
Democratic	9,163	30.1%
Republican	13,542	44.4%
Democratic–Republican spread	-4,379	-14.3%
American Independent	1,502	4.9%
Green	125	0.4%
Libertarian	234	0.8%
Peace and Freedom	92	0.3%
Americans Elect	0	0.0%
Other	108	0.4%
No party preference	5,719	18.8%

==== Cities by population and voter registration ====
Cities by population and voter registration
City	Population	Registered voters	Democratic	Republican	D–R spread	Other	No party preference
Corning	7,624	33.8%	35.2%	35.1%	+0.1%	11.7%	22.8%
Red Bluff	14,026	42.1%	33.8%	37.2%	-3.4%	12.8%	21.6%
Tehama	383	54.3%	35.1%	39.9%	-4.8%	15.4%	16.8%

=== Overview ===
Tehama is a strongly Republican county in presidential and congressional elections. The last Democrat to win a majority in the county was Jimmy Carter in 1976. Bill Clinton won a plurality in 1992.

United States presidential election results for Tehama County, California (Note: This total comprised 1,218 votes for Progressive Theodore Roosevelt (who was official Republican nominee in California), 388 votes for Socialist Eugene V. Debs and 168 votes for Prohibition Party nominee Eugene W. Chafin.)
Year	Republican		Democratic		Third party(ies)	
Year	No.	%	No.	%	No.	%
1880	868	47.61%	954	52.33%	1	0.05%
1884	1,075	47.80%	1,146	50.96%	28	1.24%
1888	1,171	46.88%	1,290	51.64%	37	1.48%
1892	969	43.39%	1,045	46.80%	219	9.81%
1896	969	45.39%	1,135	53.16%	31	1.45%
1900	1,210	50.35%	1,138	47.36%	55	2.29%
1904	1,234	56.32%	720	32.86%	237	10.82%
1908	1,064	47.46%	894	39.88%	284	12.67%
1912	13	0.38%	1,595	47.16%	1,774	52.45%
1916	1,739	36.32%	2,534	52.92%	515	10.76%
1920	2,462	61.81%	1,079	27.09%	442	11.10%
1924	1,943	45.97%	486	11.50%	1,798	42.54%
1928	3,393	65.58%	1,650	31.89%	131	2.53%
1932	2,001	34.20%	3,534	60.40%	316	5.40%
1936	2,376	38.46%	3,687	59.68%	115	1.86%
1940	2,913	43.95%	3,618	54.59%	97	1.46%
1944	2,903	47.79%	3,130	51.53%	41	0.68%
1948	3,348	51.27%	2,920	44.72%	262	4.01%
1952	5,742	64.31%	3,110	34.83%	77	0.86%
1956	4,866	53.82%	4,143	45.82%	33	0.36%
1960	5,522	49.96%	5,483	49.61%	47	0.43%
1964	4,529	39.50%	6,928	60.42%	10	0.09%
1968	5,198	47.26%	4,565	41.50%	1,236	11.24%
1972	6,054	48.73%	5,175	41.65%	1,195	9.62%
1976	6,110	44.81%	6,990	51.27%	535	3.92%
1980	9,140	59.13%	4,832	31.26%	1,485	9.61%
1984	11,586	62.78%	6,527	35.37%	342	1.85%
1988	9,854	56.52%	7,213	41.37%	367	2.11%
1992	7,419	35.36%	7,508	35.79%	6,052	28.85%
1996	10,292	50.34%	7,290	35.66%	2,861	14.00%
2000	13,270	63.63%	6,507	31.20%	1,077	5.16%
2004	15,572	66.42%	7,504	32.01%	368	1.57%
2008	14,843	60.74%	8,945	36.61%	648	2.65%
2012	14,235	61.95%	7,934	34.53%	808	3.52%
2016	15,494	64.81%	6,809	28.48%	1,605	6.71%
2020	19,141	66.62%	8,911	31.02%	679	2.36%
2024	18,503	69.73%	7,415	27.94%	618	2.33%

In the United States House of Representatives, Tehama County is in California's 1st congressional district, represented by Republican James Gallagher.

In the California State Legislature, the county is in the 1st Senate District, represented by Republican Megan Dahle, and the 3rd Assembly District, represented by Republican James Gallagher.

On November 4, 2008, Tehama County voted 72.7% for Proposition 8, which amended the California Constitution to ban same-sex marriages.

== Communities ==
=== Cities ===
- Corning
- Red Bluff (county seat)
- Tehama

=== Unincorporated communities ===
- El Camino
- Kirkwood
- Loybas Hill
- Mill Creek
- Mineral

=== Census-designated places ===
- Bend
- Dales
- Flournoy
- Gerber
- Lake California
- Las Flores
- Los Molinos
- Manton
- Mineral CDP
- Paskenta
- Paynes Creek
- Proberta
- Rancho Tehama
- Richfield
- Vina

=== Population ranking ===
The population ranking of the following table is based on the 2020 census of Tehama County.

† county seat

Rank	City/Town/etc.	Municipal type	Population (2020 Census)
1	† Red Bluff	City	14,710
2	Corning	City	8,244
3	Lake California	CDP	3,377
4	Los Molinos	CDP	2,098
5	Rancho Tehama	CDP	1,572
6	Gerber	CDP	1,044
7	Bend	CDP	603
8	Tehama	City	435
9	Manton	CDP	310
10	Richfield	CDP	309
11	Proberta	CDP	237
12	Vina	CDP	198
13	Las Flores	CDP	190
14	Mineral	CDP	136
15	Flournoy	CDP	117
16	Paskenta	CDP	110
17	Paynes Creek	CDP	54

== See also ==
- National Register of Historic Places listings in Tehama County, California
- Orland Buttes
- Red Bank, California
- Tuscan Springs
