= Los Molinos =

Los Molinos may refer to:

== Places ==
=== Spain ===
- Los Molinos, Madrid, a municipality in Community of Madrid
- Los Molinos (Arén), in Huesca Province
- Los Molinos de Sipán, a locality in the municipality of Loporzano, Huesca Province
- Los Molinos (Sobrarbe), a locality in the municipality of El Pueyo de Araguás, Huesca Province
- Los Molinos, Lanzarote, a village in the Canary Islands
- Calzada de los Molinos, a municipality in the province of Palencia, Castile and León

=== Elsewhere ===
- Los Molinos, La Rioja, a municipality in La Rioja Province, Argentina
- Los Molinos Dam, dam over the course of the Los Molinos River in the province of Córdoba, Argentina
- Los Molinos, California, a census-designated place (CDP) in Tehama County, California
- Los Molinos, Chile, coastal village and harbour near Valdivia, Chile
- San José de los Molinos District, district of the province Ica, Peru
- Rancho Rio de los Molinos, a 22,172-acre (89.73 km^{2}) Mexican land grant in present-day Tehama County, California

== Other uses ==
- 10476 Los Molinos, an asteroid
- Los Molinos CF, a football club in Spain
- Los Molinos Observatory, in Uruguay

== See also ==
- El Molino (disambiguation)
- Molinos (disambiguation)
