= Molinos =

Molinos may refer to:

== Places ==
- Molinos (TransMilenio), a railway station in Bogotá, Colombia
- Molinos, Chile, a village in the Arica and Parinacota Region
- Molinos, Jauja, seat of Molinos District, Peru
- Molinos, Salta, a village and rural municipality in Salta Province, northwestern Argentina
- Molinos, Teruel, a municipality in Maestrazgo comarca, province of Teruel, Aragon, Spain
- Molinos de Duero, a municipality in the province of Soria, Castile and León, Spain
- Molinos District, one of thirty-four districts of the province Jauja in Peru

== People with the surname ==
- Edgar Molinos (born 1971), German weightlifter
- Jacques Molinos (1743–1831), French architect
- Miguel de Molinos (1628–1696), Spanish theologian and mystic

== Other uses ==
- Molinos (album), an award-winning musical album by The Paperboys, or its title track and lead single
- Molinos Río de la Plata, an Argentine branded food products company

== See also ==
- 3 Molinos Resort, a professional cycling team based in Spain, founded and disbanded 2006
- Battle of Arroyo dos Molinos, fought 1811 during the Peninsular War in Spain
- Calzada de los Molinos, a municipality in the province of Palencia, Castile and León, Spain
- Rancho Rio de los Molinos, a Mexican land grant in present-day Tehama County, California
- San José de los Molinos District, one of fourteen districts of the province Ica in Peru
- San Pedro Molinos, a town and municipality in Oaxaca, south-western Mexico
- Los Molinos (disambiguation)
- Molino (disambiguation)
- Molinos de viento (disambiguation)
