= Molins =

Molins or Molíns may refer to:

Places

- Molins de Rei, a municipality near Barcelona, Spain
- Molins-sur-Aube, a commune in Champagne-Ardenne, France
- Palace of the Marquis of Molíns, a building in Madrid, Spain
- Pont de Molins, a municipality in Catalonia, Spain

People

- Pierre de Molins, 13th-century trouvère (French songster)
- Roger de Moulins, 12th-century Grand Master of the Knights Hospitaller
- P. des Molins, 14th-century French composer
- Adam Molins (d. 1450), English bishop
- Emilio Molíns, Spanish army officer, Governor-General of the Philippines
- Jason Molins (born 1974), Irish cricketer
- Greg Molins (born 1976), Irish cricketer
- Guillermo Molins (born 1988), Swedish-Uruguayan footballer
- Lara Molins (born 1980), Irish cricketer
- Mariano Roca de Togores, 1st Marquis of Molíns (1812–1889), Spanish nobleman
- Louis Sala-Molins (born 1935), French academic

Other uses

- Molins gun, a variation of the Ordnance QF 6-pounder anti-tank gun

== See also ==
- Molin (disambiguation)
- Molino (disambiguation)
- Molinos (disambiguation)
