= Rancho Primer Cañon o Rio de Los Berrendos =

Mexican land grant in California

Coordinates: 40.160°N 122.120°W

Rancho Primer Cañon o Rio de Los Berrendos was a 26,637-acre (107.80 km^{2}) Mexican land grant in present-day Tehama County, California given in 1844 by Governor Manuel Micheltorena to Job Francis Dye. Rio de Los Berrendos means River of the Antelopes. The grant was on the east side of the Sacramento River and was bounded by Antelope Creek on the north and Rancho Rio de los Molinos and Dye Creek on the south.

== History ==
Job Francis Dye (1807–1883) was born in Allen County, Kentucky. In 1830, he joined a party of trappers heading west from Fort Smith. After wintering and spending most of 1831 in Taos, New Mexico, Dye joined another band of trappers which arrived in Pueblo de Los Angeles early in 1832. After a year of sea otter hunting, he worked for Captain John B.R. Cooper on his Rancho El Sur from 1833 to 1835. Moving north again, Dye rented a portion of Joaquin Buelna's Rancho Zayante near Santa Cruz, and built a small grist mill and a distillery. In 1839, Dye married Escolastica Rodriguez (b. 1822). Dye arrived at his six square league grant in the company of Robert Hasty Thomes (Rancho Saucos), Albert G. Toomes (Rancho Rio de los Molinos), and William Chard (Rancho Las Flores).

With the cession of California to the United States following the Mexican-American War, the 1848 Treaty of Guadalupe Hidalgo provided that the land grants would be honored. As required by the Land Act of 1851, a claim for Rancho Primer Cañon o Rio de Los Berrendos was filed with the Public Land Commission in 1852, and the grant was patented to Job Francis Dye in 1871.

In 1857 Dye sold 8,000 acres (32.4 km^{2}) at the southern end of his grant to F.W. Fratt and T.K. King. The boundary between Rancho Primer Cañon o Rio de Los Berrendos and Toomes Rancho Rio de Los Molinos grants was roughly Dye Creek. However the location of the exact boundary was the cause of several lawsuits. In 1871, Robert Hurd Blossom (b. 1829) purchased F. W. Fratt's portion of the Dye Grant. In 1882 Blossom sold it to Major Joseph Spencer Cone (1822–1894), who owned the greater portion of the Dye Grant, reuniting that rancho. Cone also bought the northern half of the Toomes Grant. Cone's widow, Anna R. Cone, sold Cone Ranch sold to the Los Molinos Land Company in 1905.

Dye was moderately successful in gold mining in 1848, and in 1853, he married Sarah Adeline Herrall (1826–1862). After the death of his wife and daughter in 1862, he joined the Silver rush in Idaho and then Nevada. Later, he moved to Santa Cruz County, California where he married Jemima Boyce (b. 1813), in 1873, and died there March 4, 1883.
