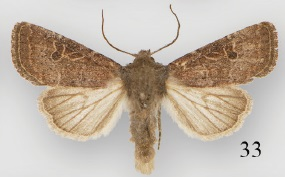
- Protorthodes rufula

Scientific classification
- Domain: Eukaryota
- Kingdom: Animalia
- Phylum: Arthropoda
- Class: Insecta
- Order: Lepidoptera
- Superfamily: Noctuoidea
- Family: Noctuidae
- Subfamily: Hadeninae
- Genus: Protorthodes; McDunnough, 1943

= Protorthodes =

Genus of moths

Protorthodes is a genus of moths of the family Noctuidae.

== Species ==
- Protorthodes alfkenii (Grote, 1895)
- Protorthodes antennata (Barnes & McDunnough, 1912)
- Protorthodes argentoppida McDunnough, 1943
- Protorthodes curtica (Smith, 1890)
- Protorthodes eureka (Barnes & Benjamin, 1927)
- Protorthodes incincta (Morrison, 1875)
- Protorthodes melanopis (Hampson, 1905)
- Protorthodes mexicana Lafontaine, 2014
- Protorthodes mulina (Schaus, 1894)
- Protorthodes orobia (Harvey, 1876)
- Protorthodes oviduca (Guenée, 1852)
- Protorthodes perforata (Grote, 1883)
- Protorthodes rufula (Grote, 1874)
- Protorthodes texicana Lafontaine, 2014
- Protorthodes ustulata Lafontaine, Walsh & Ferris, 2014

== Former species ==
- Protorthodes constans (Dyar, 1918)
- Protorthodes texana (Smith, 1900)
- Protorthodes variabilis (Barnes & McDunnough, 1912)
