= Molin =

Molin may refer to:

- Molin (surname)
- Xie Molin (born 1979), Chinese artist
- Molin, Banat, a former village in Vojvodina province, Serbia
  - Molin Forest, on the site of the former village
- Molin, Homalin, a village in Sagaing Region, Burma

== See also ==
- Molino (disambiguation)
- Molins (disambiguation)
