= Molino =

Molino or El Molino can refer to:

== Places ==
- Molino, several barangays (districts) within the city of Bacoor, Cavite, Philippines (soon to be transferred to Las Piñas along with San Nicolas and Queen's Row)
- Molino, Florida, a census-designated place in Escambia County
- El Molino, La Guajira, a town and municipality in the Colombian Department of La Guajira
- Molino (Messina), a frazione of the comune of Messina, Province of Messina, Sicily
- Molino, Missouri, an unincorporated place
- Molino, Pennsylvania, a village in West Brunswick Township, Pennsylvania
- Molino Canyon, a gorge in Arizona
- Molino de Flores Nezahualcóyotl National Park, Texcoco, Mexico
- Molino dei Torti, a comune in the Province of Alessandria in the Italian region of Piedmont
- Molino del Rey, a former royal windmill near Mexico City, now the site of Los Pinos, official residence of the President of Mexico
  - Battle of Molino del Rey, fought 1847 during the Mexican–American War
- Molino District, one of four districts of the province Pachitea in Peru
- Molino Nuovo, a quarter of the city of Lugano, in the Swiss canton of Ticino

== People ==
- Andrea Molino (born 1964), Italian composer and conductor
- Anthony Molino (born 1957), American translator, anthropologist, and psychoanalyst
- Antonio Molino Rojo (1926-2011), Spanish film actor
- Fernando García del Molino (1813–99), Chilean-born Argentine portrait painter, miniaturist and lithographer
- Francesco Molino (1775-1847), Italian guitarist and composer
- Jean Molino (active from 1990), French semiologist at the University of Lausanne
- Jorge Molino (Jorge Molino Baena, born 1988), Spanish footballer
- Kevin Molino (born 1990), Trinidadian footballer
- Lou Molino III (active from 1985), American drummer
- Mariel Molino (born 1992), American actress
- Walter Molino (1915–97), Italian comics artist and illustrator

== Other ==
- Molino Dam, a gravity dam on the Zapote River, Philippines
- Molino de Pérez, a windmill in Montevideo, Uruguay
- El Molino High School, Forestville, California
- El Molino River, two streams in El Salvador
- El Molino Viejo (AKA The Old Mill), a former grist mill in San Marino, California
- El Molino, a cabaret in Barcelona, Spain

== See also ==
- Archaeological Area of Poggio del Molino, Tuscany, Italy
- Confitería El Molino, an Art Nouveau style coffeehouse in Buenos Aires, Argentina
- Nudorthodes molino, a moth in the family Noctuidae
- Paso del Molino, a barrio (neighbourhood or district) in Montevideo, Uruguay
- Ponte Molino (Padua), a Roman segmental arch bridge across the Bacchiglione in Padua, Italy
- Rancho El Molino, a Mexican land grant in present-day Sonoma County, California
- University of Perpetual Help System DALTA – Molino Campus, Bacoor, Cavite, Philippines
- Los Molinos (disambiguation)
- Molinos (disambiguation)
