= Marco Chiesa =

Swiss politician (born 1974)

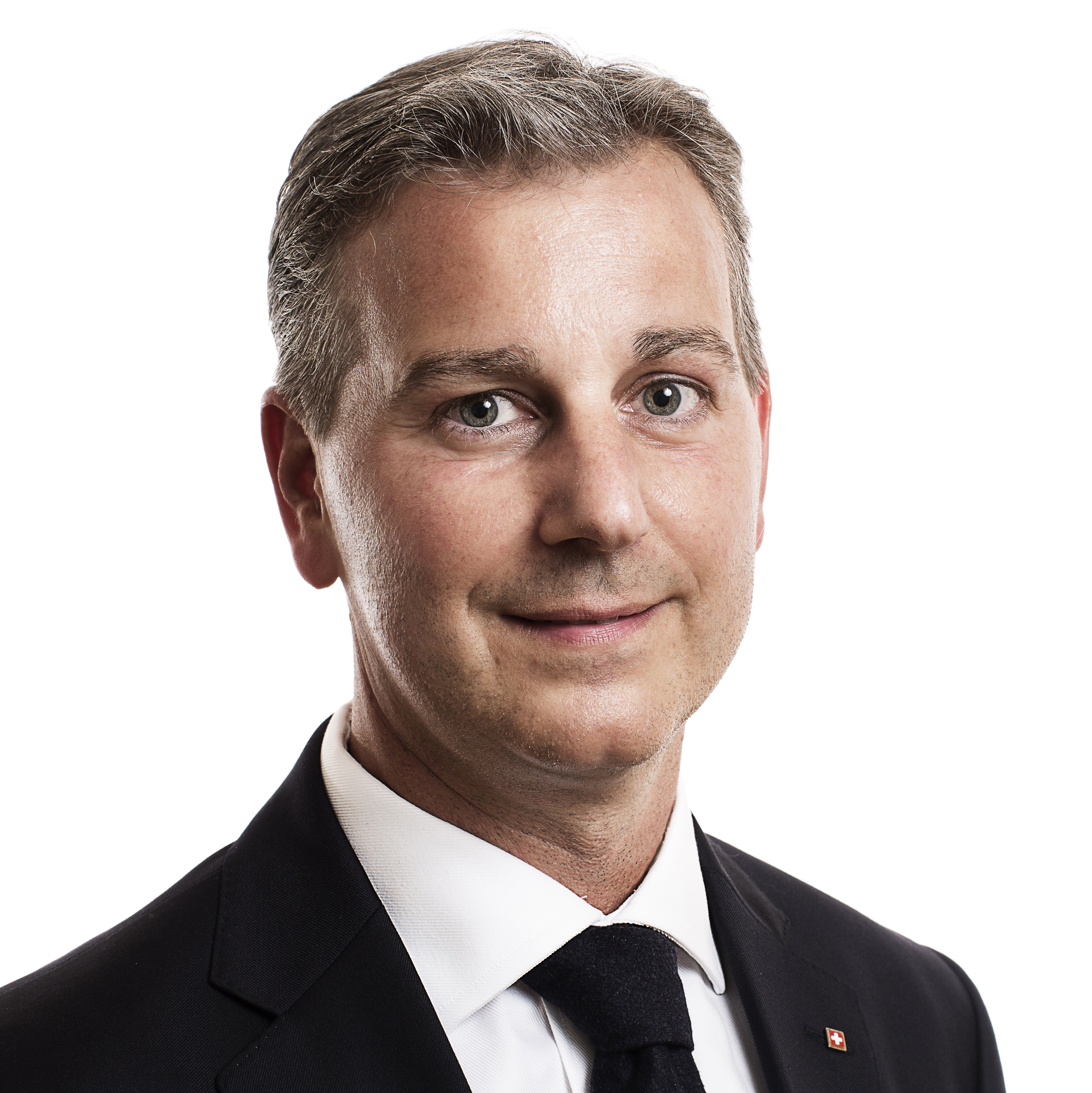

President of the Swiss People's Party
- In office 22 August 2020 – 23 March 2024
- Preceded by: Albert Rösti
- Succeeded by: Marcel Dettling

Member of the Council of States
- Incumbent
- Assumed office 2 December 2019
- Constituency: Ticino

Member of the National Council
- In office 30 November 2015 – 1 December 2019
- Constituency: Ticino

Member of the Grand Council of Ticino
- In office 2007–2015

Personal details
- Born: 10 October 1974 (age 51) Lugano, Switzerland
- Party: Swiss People's Party

Marco Chiesa (born 10 October 1974) is a Swiss politician who presided over the Swiss People's Party (SVP/UDC) from 2020 to 2024. He served as a member of the Grand Council of Ticino from 2007 to 2015 and National Council from 2015 to 2019. Chiesa has been a member of the Council of States since 2019.

== Biography ==
Chiesa was born in Lugano in 1974. His father was a street maintenance worker and he grew up in the Molino Nuovo section of the city. He graduated from the University of Fribourg with a degree in business administration.

After college, he worked as a tax advisor and banking expert. However, his career shifted when he became the manager of a retirement home in the Italian speaking region of Grisons. He entered politics as a member of the municipal council of Villa Luganese. In 2007, he was elected to the Grand Council of Ticino. He won a seat in the National Council in 2015 and served one term. In the 2019, he finished second in the first round of voting behind incumbent Filippo Lombardi. With no candidates taking an absolute majority in the first round, the election went to a second round where Chiesa and Marina Carobbio Guscetti surprised with a win over, Lombardi and Giovanni Merlini (politician). Chiesa became the first member of the SVP to represent Ticino in the Council of States and, with the defeat of Merlini, was the first time in more than a century that FDP.The Liberals and its predecessor, the FDP, did not elect one of its members from Ticino.

Chiesa was elected to his party's vice presidency in 2018. In 2019, he was mentioned as a possible successor to outgoing SVP president Albert Rösti; however, he initially rejected the overtures as his management of the retirement home did not allow him to take on another position. He later resigned from the center, which opened up the possibility of his nomination. In July 2020, a selection committee of the SVP tasked with nominating a new party president named Chiesa as its preferred candidate for the post. Andreas Glarner withdrew in favor of Chiesa. Before the election, Alfred Heer also withdrew. Chiesa was formally elected as the party president on 22 August 2020.

Chiesa has been described as being very close to former SVP power broker Christoph Blocher. He has supported changes to Switzerland's bilateral treaties with the European Union with regard to immigration. He has criticized immigration, claiming it to be responsible for traffic jams, higher housing costs and unfair competition for workers.

In December 2023, Chiesa announced he would not run for another term as SVP president, citing the party's gains in the 2023 Swiss federal election. In March 2024, he was succeeded as president of the SVP by Marcel Dettling.

In April 2024, Chiesa was elected to Lugano's city council.

He speaks Italian and French fluently and can speak German well.
