= Rancho Saucos =

Mexican land grant in California

Coordinates: 40.010°N 122.160°W

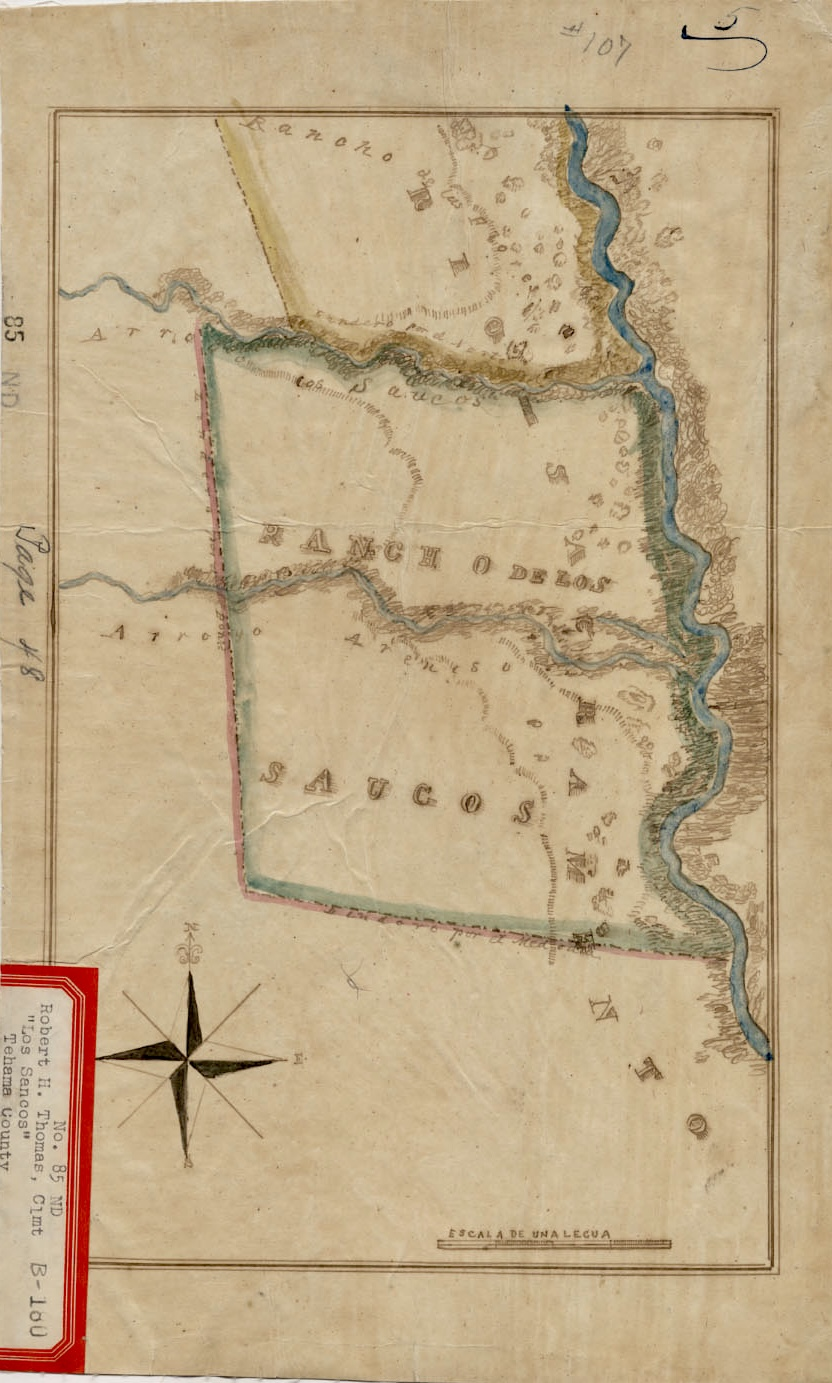
Diseño for Rancho de los Saucos along Río Sacramento (c. 1844)

Rancho Saucos was a 22,212-acre (89.89 km^{2}) Mexican land grant in present-day Tehama County, California given in 1844 by Governor Manuel Micheltorena to Robert H. Thomes. The name means "Ranch of the Elder trees". The grant extended along the west side of the Sacramento River from Elder Creek and Rancho Las Flores on the north to Thomes Creek on the south, and encompassed present-day Tehama.

== History ==
Robert Hasty Thomes (1817–1878), was born in Cumberland County, Maine and came to California in 1841 with the Bartleson-Bidwell Party.

Thomes and Albert G. Toomes became partners in a carpentry business in Monterey. They built a house in Monterey for Governor pro tem Manuel Jimeno. Thomes arrived in the Tehama area in the company of Albert G. Toomes (Rancho Rio de los Molinos), William Chard (Rancho Las Flores), and Job Francis Dye (Rancho Primer Cañon o Rio de Los Berrendos). Thomes five square league grant was directly across the Sacramento River from the five square league Rancho Rio de los Molinos grant of Toomes. In 1850, Thomes mapped out on the land grant what would become the city of Tehama. It was the last stop for the riverboats for a few years, and the first county seat. When the boats started going further up the river, Red Bluff became the center of trade and the county seat.

With the cession of California to the United States following the Mexican-American War, the 1848 Treaty of Guadalupe Hidalgo provided that the land grants would be honored. As required by the Land Act of 1851, a claim for Rancho Saucos, sometimes called Rancho Thomes, was filed with the Public Land Commission in 1852, and the grant was patented to Robert H. Thomes in 1857.

In January 1862, some 2,000 head of cattle were expected to perish at the ranch, presumably due to Great Flood of 1862. Thomes died in Tehama March 26, 1878, unmarried.

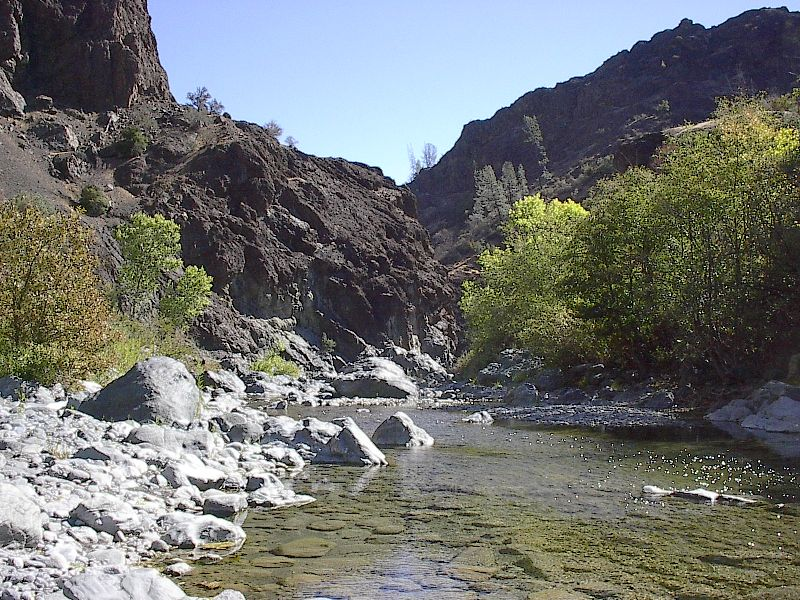
Thomes Creek

By 1887, about 19,000 acres of the Thomes grant were owned by the John Finnell family, with balance owned by "Messrs. Tyler, Mooney & Schultz". The land was most used for growing wheat, as well as some orchard fruit production. The land was said to be host to 50 artesian springs. John Finnell, and his sons Simpson Finnell, Simpson Finnell, and Thompson Finnell, each took about a quarter of the land, "in the order names, beginning from the north" and established their own farmsteads. The lands of Mooney and J. C. Tyler lay northwest of John Finnell's property. Elder Creek ran through Tyler's farm.

== See also ==
- Finnell Ranch
- List of ranchos of California
