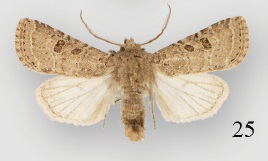
- Male
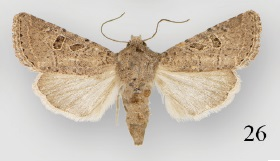
- Female

Scientific classification
- Kingdom: Animalia
- Phylum: Arthropoda
- Class: Insecta
- Order: Lepidoptera
- Superfamily: Noctuoidea
- Family: Noctuidae
- Genus: Protorthodes
- Species: P. melanopis

Binomial name
- Protorthodes melanopis (Hampson, 1905)

Synonyms
- Eriopyga melanopis Hampson, 1905; Eutelia melanopis (Hampson, 1905)

= Protorthodes melanopis =

Species of moth

Protorthodes melanopis is a moth in the family Noctuidae. It is found across the southern United States, from western Texas to southern California. Its range extends as far north as southern Utah and as far south as northern Mexico.

The length of the forewings is 11–14 mm. The ground colour of the forewings is pale grey-brown which emphasizes the contrast between the reniform spot, orbicular spot and the ground color. The pale hindwings of the males contrast with the forewings. In males the hindwing is white and translucent, with some fuscous shading on the veins and wing margin. In females, the hindwing is covered with a fuscous sheen, darker on the veins and wing margin. Adults are on wing from late February to early May and again from mid-August to late September.
