= Toni Brunner =

Swiss politician

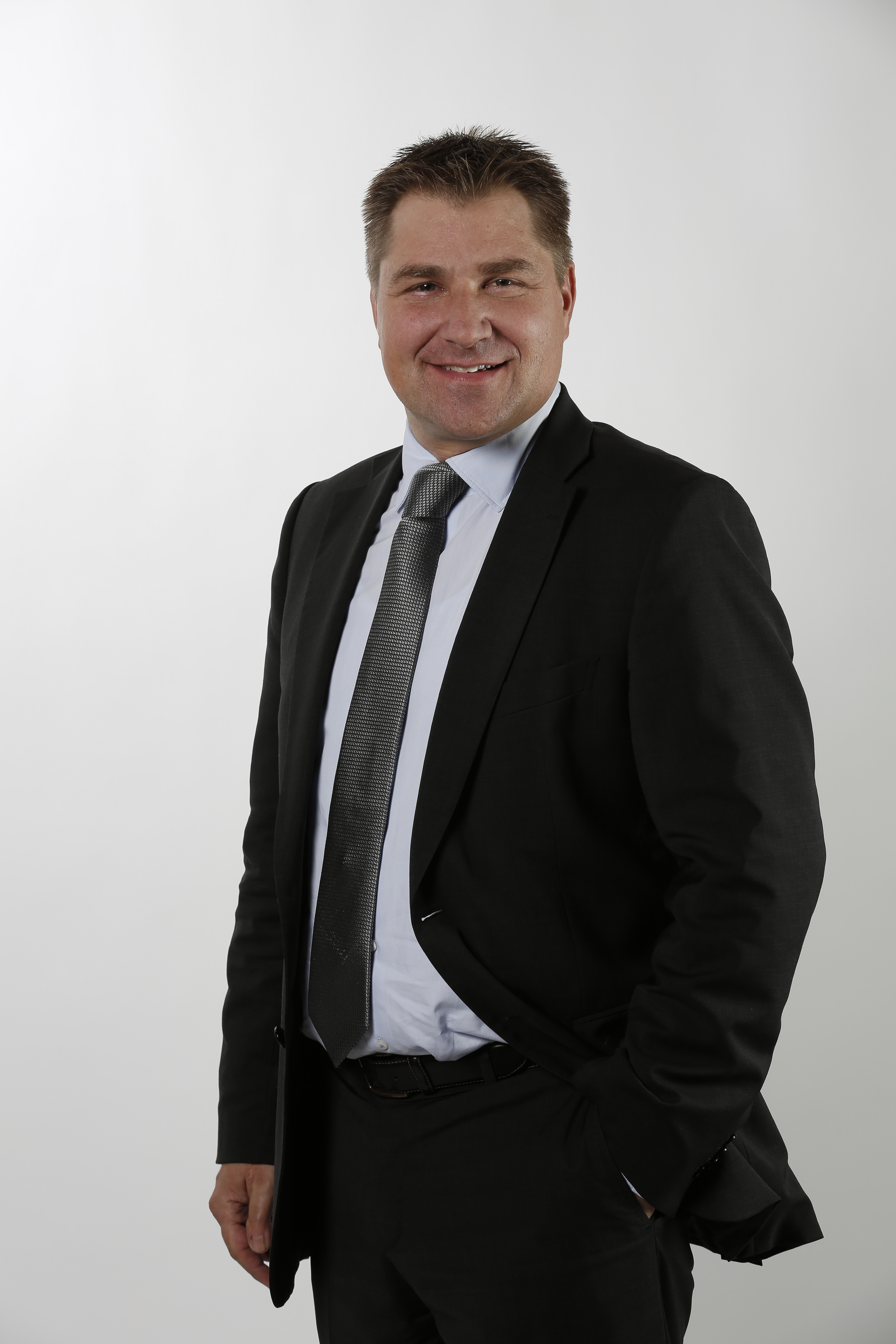

President of the Swiss People's Party
- In office 1 March 2008 – 23 April 2016
- Preceded by: Ueli Maurer
- Succeeded by: Albert Rösti

Member of the National Council
- In office 4 December 1995 – 31 December 2018
- Constituency: St. Gallen

Personal details
- Born: Anton Brunner; 23 August 1974 (age 51) Wattwil, Switzerland
- Party: Swiss People's Party
- Profession: Farmer

Anton "Toni" Brunner (born 23 August 1974) is a Swiss farmer and politician who presided over the Swiss People's Party (SVP/UDC) from 2008 to 2016. He was a member of the National Council from 1995 to 2018.

== Biography ==
Born in Wattwil (St. Gallen), Brunner was first elected to the federal parliament in 1995 at the age of 21, as the youngest member ever. In addition to working on his farm, he operated an internet radio station aimed at farmers, and chaired the St. Gallen section of his party.

On 1 March 2008, Brunner succeeded Ueli Maurer as chairman of the national party. Brunner is close to the party's figurehead, Christoph Blocher, who serves as one of several vice chairmen.

In January 2016, soon after the 2015 federal election, where the Swiss People's Party received record gains, Brunner announced that he would step down as the president of the SVP in April. He was succeeded by Albert Rösti on 23 April 2016.

Brunner is a member of the Campaign for an Independent and Neutral Switzerland.
