= Rancho Las Flores =

Former Mexican land grant in present-day Tehama County, California

Coordinates: 40.090°N 122.200°W

Rancho Las Flores was a 13,316-acre (53.89 km^{2}) Mexican land grant in present-day Tehama County, California given in 1844 by Governor Manuel Micheltorena to William Chard. The name means "ranch of the flowers". The grant was on the west side of the Sacramento River and was bounded by Rancho Barranca Colorado and Coyote Creek on the north and by Rancho Saucos and Elder Creek on the south, and encompassed present-day Gerber and Proberta.

== History ==
William George Chard (1812–1877) was born in New York and came to California via New Mexico about 1832. Chard lived in Los Angeles for four years, before he moved to the Monterey area. Chard married Maria Esteven Robles (1823-1871) in 1837. In 1843, Chard was a business partner of Josiah Belden in Monterey. Chard was granted three square leagues and arrived in the area in the company of Albert G. Toomes (Rancho Rio de los Molinos), Robert Hasty Thomes (Rancho Saucos) and Job Francis Dye (Rancho Primer Cañon o Rio de Los Berrendos). Chard was superintendent of the New Almaden quicksilver mine south of San Jose until 1846.

With the cession of California to the United States following the Mexican-American War, the 1848 Treaty of Guadalupe Hidalgo provided that the land grants would be honored. As required by the Land Act of 1851, a claim for Rancho Las Flores was filed with the Public Land Commission in 1852, and the grant was patented to William George Chard in 1859.
