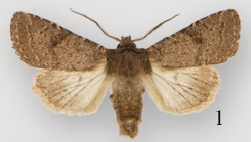
- Male
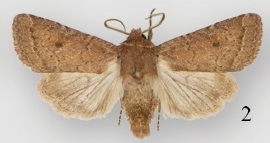
- Female

Scientific classification
- Domain: Eukaryota
- Kingdom: Animalia
- Phylum: Arthropoda
- Class: Insecta
- Order: Lepidoptera
- Superfamily: Noctuoidea
- Family: Noctuidae
- Genus: Protorthodes
- Species: P. curtica

Binomial name
- Protorthodes curtica (Smith, 1890)

Synonyms
- Taeniocampa curtica Smith, 1890; Taeniocampa bostura Smith, 1908

= Protorthodes curtica =

Species of moth

Protorthodes curtica is a moth in the family Noctuidae first described by Smith in 1890. It is found in North America from the interior of southern British Columbia southward in the West Coast states, mainly to the east of the Cascades and Coastal ranges, to southern California. It occurs in the Rocky Mountains in Idaho and Montana and in the Ruby Mountains of Nevada. The habitat consists of dry forested areas.

The length of the forewings is 12–16 mm. The forewings have a dark reddish tint and a pale, curved subterminal line that follows the wing margin. There is an even band of dark shading along the inner edge of the subterminal line and the reniform is faintly outlined by a pale line. Adults are on wing from late June to mid-October.

The larvae feed on various herbaceous plants, including Asteraceae (including Ericameria species), Scrophulariaceae and Rosaceae and species.
