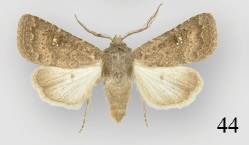
- Male
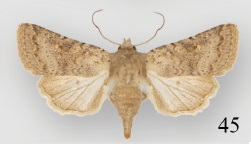
- Female

Scientific classification
- Kingdom: Animalia
- Phylum: Arthropoda
- Class: Insecta
- Order: Lepidoptera
- Superfamily: Noctuoidea
- Family: Noctuidae
- Genus: Protorthodes
- Species: P. antennata

Binomial name
- Protorthodes antennata (Barnes & McDunnough, 1912)

Synonyms
- Eriopyga antennata Barnes & McDunnough, 1912

= Protorthodes antennata =

Species of moth

Protorthodes antennata is a moth in the family Noctuidae first described by William Barnes and James Halliday McDunnough in 1912.

== Distribution ==
It has a small distribution in North America, extending from central Arizona to northernmost Mexico.

== Description ==
The length of the forewings is 10–14 mm. The reniform spot on the forewings is not outlined like in other Protorthodes species. There is a series of tiny white dots that partially define the reniform spot, and a series of tiny yellow dots that form a partial outer border of the spot. Adults have been recorded on wing from mid-May to mid-June and in October.
