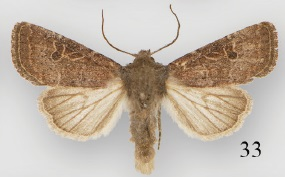
- Male
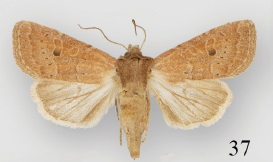
- Female

Scientific classification
- Domain: Eukaryota
- Kingdom: Animalia
- Phylum: Arthropoda
- Class: Insecta
- Order: Lepidoptera
- Superfamily: Noctuoidea
- Family: Noctuidae
- Genus: Protorthodes
- Species: P. rufula

Binomial name
- Protorthodes rufula (Grote, 1874)

Synonyms
- Dianthoecia rufula Grote, 1874

= Protorthodes rufula =

Species of moth

Protorthodes rufula, the rufous Quaker moth, is a moth in the family Noctuidae. The species was first described by Augustus Radcliffe Grote in 1874. It is found in western North America along the Pacific Coast, and the coastal mountain ranges from northern Washington to southern California.

The length of the forewings is 13–16 mm. The forewing ground color varies from pale whitish buff, through various shades of red and orange, to brown. Almost all specimens show some areas or patches of rufous shading. Adults have been recorded on wing from mid-April to mid-June in the north (from mid-February in southern California) and again from early August to late October.

The larvae feed on various hardwoods in the family Rosaceae, including Prunus and Malus species.
