= Rancho Rio de los Molinos =

Mexican land grant in California

Coordinates: 40.060°N 122.070°W

Rancho Rio de los Molinos was a 22,172-acre (89.73 km^{2}) Mexican land grant in present-day Tehama County, California given in 1844 by Governor Manuel Micheltorena to Albert Gallatin Toomes. "Rio de los Molinos" means "River of the Mills". The long narrow grant extended along the east side of the Sacramento River from Dye Creek on the north, to Toomes Creek on the south, and encompassed present-day Los Molinos.

== History ==
Albert Gallatin Toomes (1817–1872) was born in Missouri and came to California via New Mexico with the Workman-Rowland Party in 1841. He moved to Monterey where he married Maria Isabel Lorenzana (1822–1878) in 1844. Toomes and Robert Hasty Thomes became partners in a carpentry business in Monterey. They built a house in Monterey for Governor pro tem Manuel Jimeno. Toomes arrived in the area in the company of Thomes (Rancho Saucos), William Chard (Rancho Las Flores), and Job Francis Dye (Rancho Primer Cañon o Rio de Los Berrendos). Toomes five square league grant was directly across the Sacramento River from the five square league grant Rancho Saucos of Thomes.

With the cession of California to the United States following the Mexican-American War, the 1848 Treaty of Guadalupe Hidalgo provided that the land grants would be honored. As required by the Land Act of 1851, a claim for Rancho Rio de los Molinos was filed with the Public Land Commission in 1855, and the grant was patented to Albert Gallatin Toomes in 1858.
