= Nacaugna, California =

Former Tongva-Gabrieleño settlement

Nacaugna (also Nakaugna and Nicaugna) is a former Tongva-Gabrieleño settlement located in Downey, California at what was once Rancho Santa Gertrudes or Carpenter's Ranch. The village was referred to in San Gabriel Mission records after villagers were brought to the mission to be baptized and used for their labor to work the mission grounds. It was located in close proximity to the mission and likely declined quickly after it was founded. The village was located downstream from the village of Sejat.

== See also ==
- Toviscagna
- Category: Tongva populated places
  - Tongva language
- California mission clash of cultures
- Ranchos in California
