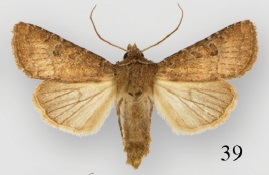
- Male
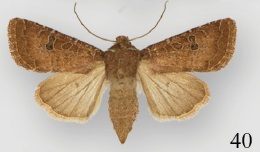
- Female

Scientific classification
- Domain: Eukaryota
- Kingdom: Animalia
- Phylum: Arthropoda
- Class: Insecta
- Order: Lepidoptera
- Superfamily: Noctuoidea
- Family: Noctuidae
- Genus: Protorthodes
- Species: P. ustulata

Binomial name
- Protorthodes ustulata Lafontaine, Walsh & Ferris, 2014

= Protorthodes ustulata =

Species of moth

Protorthodes ustulata is a moth in the family Noctuidae first described by J. Donald Lafontaine, J. Bruce Walsh and Clifford D. Ferris in 2014. It is found in North America from south-eastern Wyoming southward to the Guadalupe Mountains in western Texas and westward to central and south-eastern Arizona and northern Mexico.

The length of the forewings is 12–15 mm. The forewings are burnt orange color, tending to be darker toward the costal and outer edge. The subbasal, antemedial, postmedial and subterminal lines are whitish gray, partially bordered by dark-brown scales. The reniform spot has the shape of an eight. The upper part is gray brown and the lower part is blackish gray. It has a contrasting whitish-gray outline. The orbicular spot is slightly darker than the ground color and is outlined in whitish gray. The terminal line is dark brown. The hindwings are pale fuscous basally with darker fuscous on the discal spot, veins and marginal area. Adults have been recorded on wing from early April to mid-May and again from early August to early October.

== Etymology ==
The species name refers to the burnt-orange color of the body and forewings and is derived from Latin ustulata.
