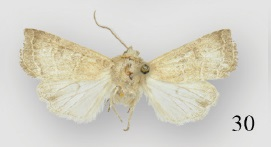
- Male

Scientific classification
- Domain: Eukaryota
- Kingdom: Animalia
- Phylum: Arthropoda
- Class: Insecta
- Order: Lepidoptera
- Superfamily: Noctuoidea
- Family: Noctuidae
- Genus: Protorthodes
- Species: P. mexicana

Binomial name
- Protorthodes mexicana Lafontaine, 2014

= Protorthodes mexicana =

Species of moth

Protorthodes mexicana is a moth in the family Noctuidae first described by J. Donald Lafontaine in 2014. It is found in Xalapa, Mexico.

The length of the forewings is about 12 mm. The forewings are pale whitish buff brown with a dusting of pale-brown scales. The subbasal, antemedial and postmedial lines are very faint and indicated by paler lines bordered on each side by scattered pale-brown scales. The subterminal line is more distinct because of darker shading in the terminal area and the outer part of the subterminal area adjacent to it. The reniform and orbicular spots are slightly darker than the ground color and are outlined in white. The terminal area is darker than the remainder of the forewing because of more numerous gray-brown scales. The hindwings are white with a trace of darker scaling on the veins and the wing margin. Adults have been recorded on wing in late April.

== Etymology ==
The species name is derived from Mexico, where it is found.
