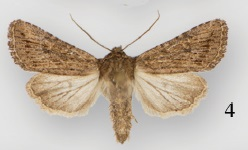
- Male
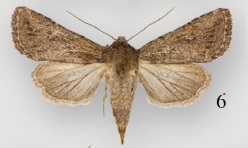
- Female

Scientific classification
- Domain: Eukaryota
- Kingdom: Animalia
- Phylum: Arthropoda
- Class: Insecta
- Order: Lepidoptera
- Superfamily: Noctuoidea
- Family: Noctuidae
- Genus: Protorthodes
- Species: P. eureka

Binomial name
- Protorthodes eureka (Barnes & Benjamin, 1927)

Synonyms
- Eriopyga eureka Barnes & Benjamin, 1927

= Protorthodes eureka =

Species of moth

Protorthodes eureka is a moth in the family Noctuidae first described by William Barnes and Foster Hendrickson Benjamin in 1927. It is found in North America from southern Alberta southward in the western Great Plains to Colorado and in the Great Basin to east-central California and south-western Colorado. The habitat consists of open xeric habitats, especially sagebrush prairie and open pinyon-juniper woodlands.

The length of the forewings is 11–13 mm. The forewings are reddish brown with a longitudinally-streaked pattern resulting from dark-colored veins and lighter-brown color between the veins. There is a series of black sagittate (arrowhead-shaped) spots on the inner side of the almost straight subterminal line. The hindwings are pale whitish gray with a gray marginal band with an indistinct medial margin. The veins are dark. Adults are on wing from early August to late September.
