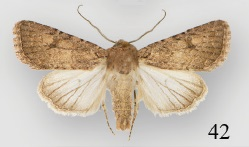
- Male
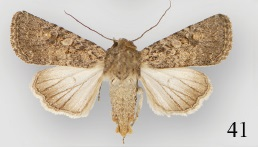
- Female

Scientific classification
- Kingdom: Animalia
- Phylum: Arthropoda
- Class: Insecta
- Order: Lepidoptera
- Superfamily: Noctuoidea
- Family: Noctuidae
- Genus: Protorthodes
- Species: P. alfkenii

Binomial name
- Protorthodes alfkenii (Grote, 1895)

Synonyms
- Perigea alfkenii Grote, 1895; Perigea latens Smith, 1908; Taeniocampa occluna Smith, 1909; Perigea perplexa Smith, 1893 [manuscript name]

= Protorthodes alfkenii =

Species of moth

Protorthodes alfkenii is a moth in the family Noctuidae first described by Augustus Radcliffe Grote in 1895. It is found in North America from central Oregon, southern Idaho, central Wyoming and north-western Texas southward to southern Mexico. The habitat consists of open arid woodlands.

The length of the forewings is 11–14 mm. It is an extremely variable species in terms of size, ground color and pattern, yet is easily identified by a combination of features. The orbicular spot is usually rounded, surrounded by a thin black line, and the spot itself usually is paler than the ground color. The reniform spot is oblique, with the lower part of the spot projecting toward the anal angle of the wing. The light and dark marks on the forewing, and the tendency for longitudinal streaks on the wing, give the forewing a busy appearance. The hindwings in males are white, often with a slight pearly sheen and with fuscous shading confined to the veins and outer part of the wing. Some females have more extensive fuscous shading on the hindwings, but usually a pearly sheen is still evident. Adults have been recorded on wing in the south from April to late June and again from early September to early November. In the Pacific Northwest they fly from mid-July to late September.

The larvae feed on various herbaceous plants.
