= Chokishgna =

Chokishgna (also, Chokisgna and alternatively referenced as Chibugna) is a former Tongva village located at what is now Bell Gardens, California. The village declined with the growth of Mission San Gabriel, which was located at the site of the nearby village of Toviscanga in 1776. The original village site was located at the later site of a jabonería established in 1832 by Lemuel Carpenter, which is currently the site of the city of Bell Gardens.
