= Albert Rösti =

Swiss Federal Councillor since 2023

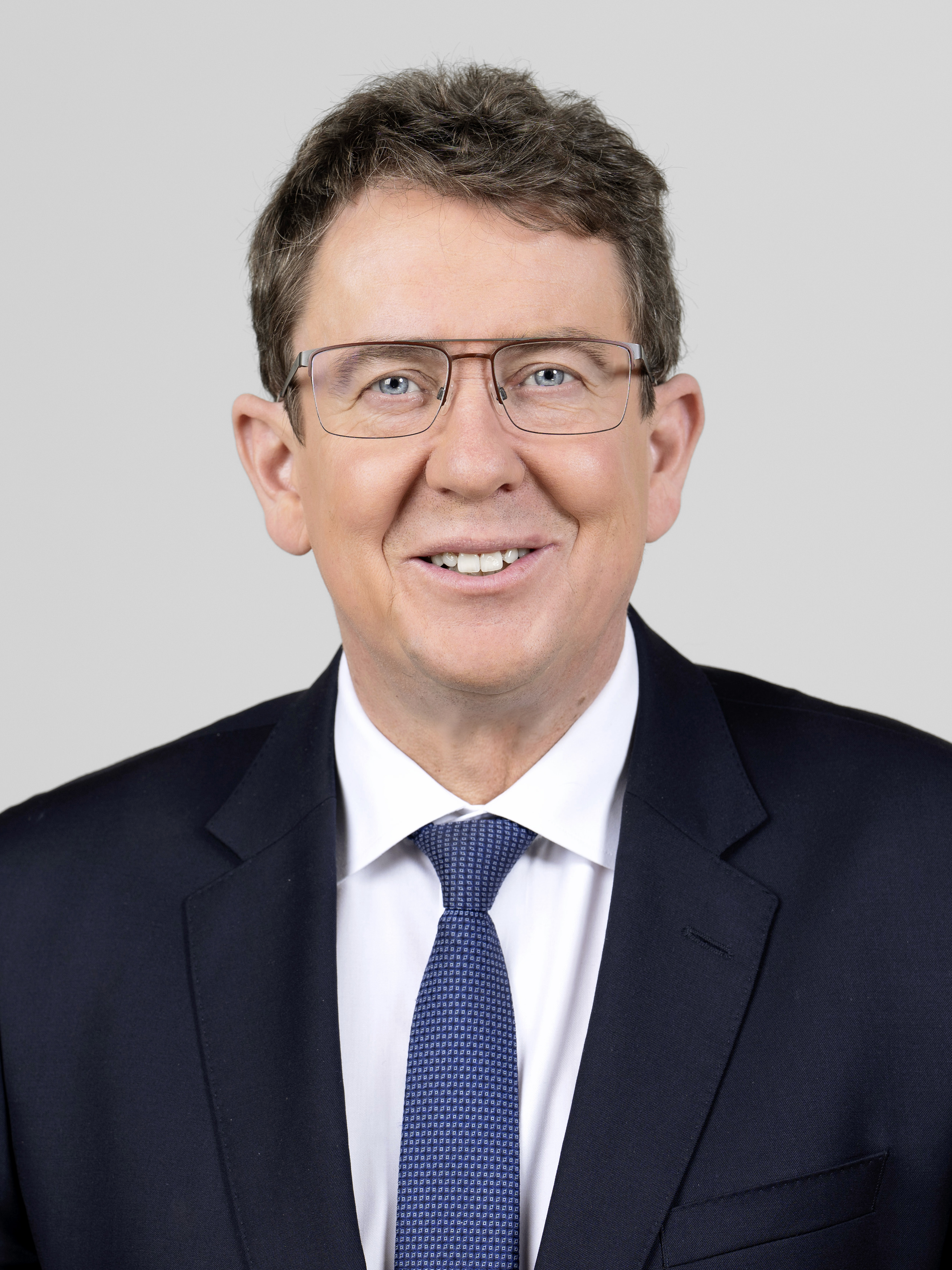
- Official portrait, 2026

Swiss Federal Councillor
- Incumbent
- Assumed office 1 January 2023
- Department: Environment, Transport, Energy and Communications (2023–present)
- Preceded by: Ueli Maurer

President of the Swiss People's Party
- In office 23 April 2016 – 22 August 2020
- Preceded by: Toni Brunner
- Succeeded by: Marco Chiesa

Member of the National Council
- In office 5 December 2011 – 31 December 2022
- Constituency: Bern

Personal details
- Born: Albert Rösti; 7 August 1967 (age 59) Frutigen, Bern, Switzerland
- Party: Swiss People's Party
- Spouse: Theres Neuenschwander (m. 1994)
- Children: 2
- Education: ETH Zurich; University of Rochester
- Occupation: Businessman, lobbyist and politician
- Website: Parliament website

Albert Rösti (Swiss Standard German: [ˈalbɛrt ˈrøːsti]; born 7 August 1967) is a Swiss businessman, lobbyist and politician who has been a Member of the Swiss Federal Council since 1 January 2023. He previously presided over the Swiss People's Party (SVP/UDC) from 2016 to 2020 and served as a member of the National Council for the canton of Bern from 2011 until 2022. Rösti resides in Uetendorf near Thun.

== Early life and education ==
Rösti was born 7 August 1967 in Kandersteg, Switzerland, the youngest of four children, to Hans Rösti (1925–2010), a mountain farmer, and Hanny Rösti (née Steeb), into a Protestant family.

The Rösti family has their place of origin in Frutigen in the Bernese Alps. His maternal grandfather was originally from Bodelshausen, Baden-Württemberg, and settled in Kandersteg, with the trade of painter in the 1920s. Roestis mother was born a German citizen and was only automatically naturalized by marriage. Hence Rösti is of partial German descent.

He attended primary and secondary schools in Kandersteg before completing his Matura at Gymnasium Thun in 1987. He graduated with a degree in agricultural engineering at ETH Zurich in 1994. Additionally, he completed a federal teaching license to lecture at vocational schools and technical universities. In 1997, Rösti completed his PhD in technical science. In 2002, he also completed an MBA program between the University of Bern and University of Rochester.

== Professional career ==
Rösti entered the Bern Department of Economic Affairs in 1998, and he served as Deputy Secretary General from 2001 to 2003 and as Secretary General from 2003 to 2006. He then became the director of Swiss Milk Producers. Since 2013 he is owner and manager of the business and politics consulting firm Büro Dr. Rösti GmbH.

From 2007 to 2014, Rösti was president of the Agricultural Information Service (LID). In May 2014, he was elected as the president of Action for a Sensible Energy Policy Switzerland (AVES). In May 2015, Rösti replaced Caspar Baader as the president of Swiss Oil, the Swiss association of fuel traders.

Rösti lives in Uetendorf, is married, and has two children.

== Political career ==
From 2000 to 2007, Rösti served as the president of Uetendorf chapter of the SVP. Since January 2008 he was a member of the local council of Uetendorf, and in 2014 he became the mayor of Uetendorf, replacing Hannes Zaugg-Graf.

Rösti ran unsuccessfully in 2010 in the Bernese Government elections. He was first elected in the 2011 Swiss federal election to the National Council. For the 2015 Swiss federal election, Rösti was the SVP's campaign manager, and he ran unsuccessfully for the Council of States for Bern. Rösti served in the National Council until 31 December 2022.

In November 2015, the Bern chapter of the SVP nominated Rösti as a candidate for the Swiss Federal Council for the 2015 elections, but he withdrew his candidacy for the Council two weeks later.

On 23 April 2016, Rösti was unanimously elected as the Chairman of the SVP, replacing retiring Chairman Toni Brunner. He resigned from the party leadership in 2020 after the election of Marco Chiesa.

On 7 December 2022, Rösti was elected to the Federal Council in the 2022 Swiss Federal Council election, replacing Ueli Maurer. He assumed office on 1 January 2023.

== Personal life ==
Since 1994, Rösti has been married to Theres Neuenschwander, a flight attendant with Swiss International Air Lines. They have two children;

- André Rösti (born 1995), an alum of University of California, Irvine, married to Markelle Kelly, a native of Washington state, who was also pursuing a PhD.
- Sarina Rösti (born 2000), a former flight attendant.

Rösti resides in Uetendorf near Thun.

Political offices
Preceded by Ueli Maurer	Member of the Swiss Federal Council; 2023–present	Incumbent
Preceded by Simonetta Sommaruga	Head of the Department of Environment, Transport, Energy and Communications; 2023–present	Incumbent
