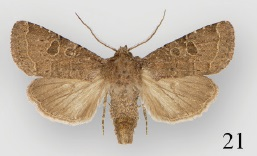
- Male
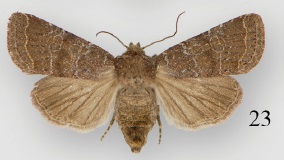
- Female

Scientific classification
- Kingdom: Animalia
- Phylum: Arthropoda
- Class: Insecta
- Order: Lepidoptera
- Superfamily: Noctuoidea
- Family: Noctuidae
- Genus: Protorthodes
- Species: P. oviduca

Binomial name
- Protorthodes oviduca (Guenée, 1852)

Synonyms
- Taeniocampa oviduca Guenée, 1852; Taeniocampa capsella Grote, 1874; Protorthodes lindrothi Krogerus, 1954

= Protorthodes oviduca =

Species of moth

Protorthodes oviduca, the ruddy Quaker moth, is a moth in the family Noctuidae. It is found across boreal and temperate areas of Canada and the northern United States with extensions in the eastern United States, ranging to central Florida and southern Alabama, and in the mountains in the West as far south as Colorado and Utah. In some areas (such as Ohio and Michigan) it is found only in sandy habitats. The species was first described by Achille Guenée in 1852.

The length of the forewings is 11–14 mm. The ground color of the forewings is reddish brown. The reniform spot is usually entirely filled with dark shading and is outlined by contrastingly pale. Adults are on wing from mid-May to early July.

The larvae feed on various herbs and grasses.
