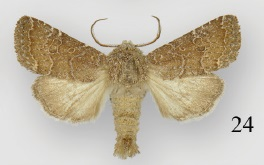
- Male

Scientific classification
- Domain: Eukaryota
- Kingdom: Animalia
- Phylum: Arthropoda
- Class: Insecta
- Order: Lepidoptera
- Superfamily: Noctuoidea
- Family: Noctuidae
- Genus: Protorthodes
- Species: P. orobia

Binomial name
- Protorthodes orobia (Harvey, 1876)

Synonyms
- Mamestra orobia Harvey, 1876; Eriopyga orobia (Harvey, 1876)

= Protorthodes orobia =

Species of moth

Protorthodes orobia is a moth in the family Noctuidae first described by Leon F. Harvey in 1876 and originally named Mamestra orobia. It is known only from the eastern part of the US state of Texas, where it is most common along the Gulf Coast.

The length of the forewings is 11–14 mm. The ground color of the forewings is gray brown with a dusting of white scales. The maculation (spots) is defined by thin white lines with the transverse lines represented on the costa by seven wider white spots. Adults are on wing in October.
