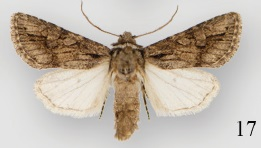

Scientific classification
- Domain: Eukaryota
- Kingdom: Animalia
- Phylum: Arthropoda
- Class: Insecta
- Order: Lepidoptera
- Superfamily: Noctuoidea
- Family: Noctuidae
- Genus: Protorthodes
- Species: P. argentoppida

Binomial name
- Protorthodes argentoppida McDunnough, 1943

= Protorthodes argentoppida =

Species of moth

Protorthodes argentoppida is a moth in the family Noctuidae first described by James Halliday McDunnough in 1943. It has a limited range within North America, occurring in xeric forested areas of various mountain ranges in New Mexico and in the White Mountains in east-central Arizona.

The length of the forewings is 13–16 mm. The ground of the forewings is silvery gray with a prominent black basal dash. The hindwings are white, with a pale smoky tint in females. Adults are on wing from mid-May to early July.
