= Marcel Dettling =

Swiss politician (born 1981)

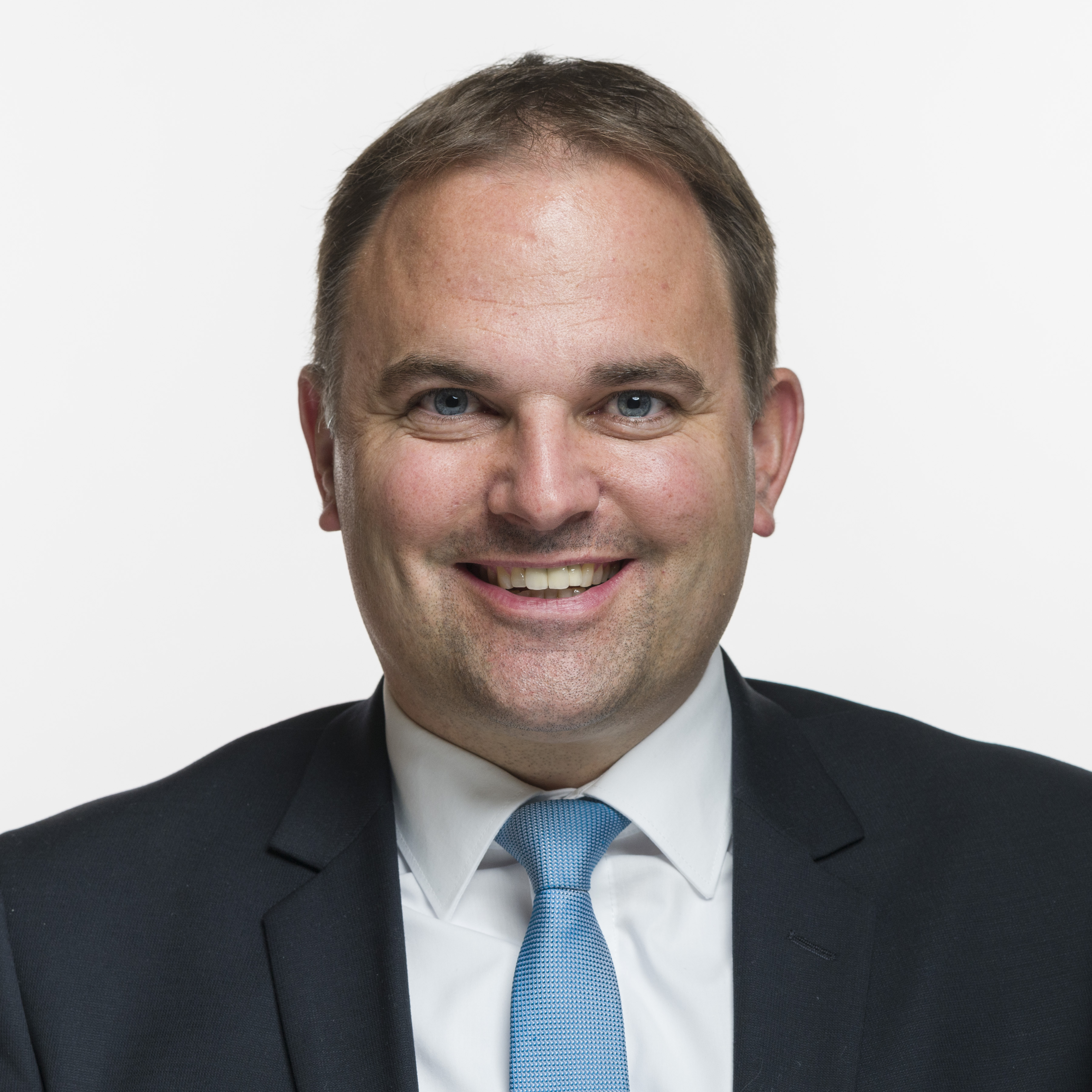
- Official portrait, 2019

President of the Swiss People's Party
- Incumbent
- Assumed office 23 March 2024
- Preceded by: Marco Chiesa

Member of the National Council (Switzerland)
- Incumbent
- Assumed office 30 November 2015
- Constituency: Canton of Schwyz

Personal details
- Born: 1 February 1981 (age 45) Einsiedeln, Switzerland
- Party: Swiss People's Party
- Occupation: Farmer; politician

Marcel Dettling (born 1 February 1981) is a Swiss farmer and politician. He currently serves as a member of the Swiss National Council for the Swiss People's Party since 2015. He currently also serves as the vice president of the Swiss People's Party on the federal level. Dettling previously served on the Cantonal Council of Schwyz from 2008 to 2015.

In March 2024, he was unanimously elected as president of the Swiss People's Party.

Dettling is part of the conservative wing of the SVP, and emphasizes opposition to migration and the European Union as political issues.
