= Lemuel Carpenter =

- Born: c. 1808; Kentucky, U.S.
- Died: 5 November 1859; Los Angeles, California
- Occupations: Entrepreneur, rancher
- Known for: Early California pioneer
- Parent(s): Jonathan and Nancy (née Shouse) Carpenter

Lemuel Carpenter (c. 1808 in Kentucky – November 5, 1859 in California) was one of the first Anglo-American settlers of what is now the Los Angeles, California metropolitan area.

== Early life ==
Lemuel Carpenter was born c. 1808 in Kentucky. He migrated to Missouri about 1828, where he served in Searcy's Company of Missouri Militia in 1829.

== Southern California Pioneer ==
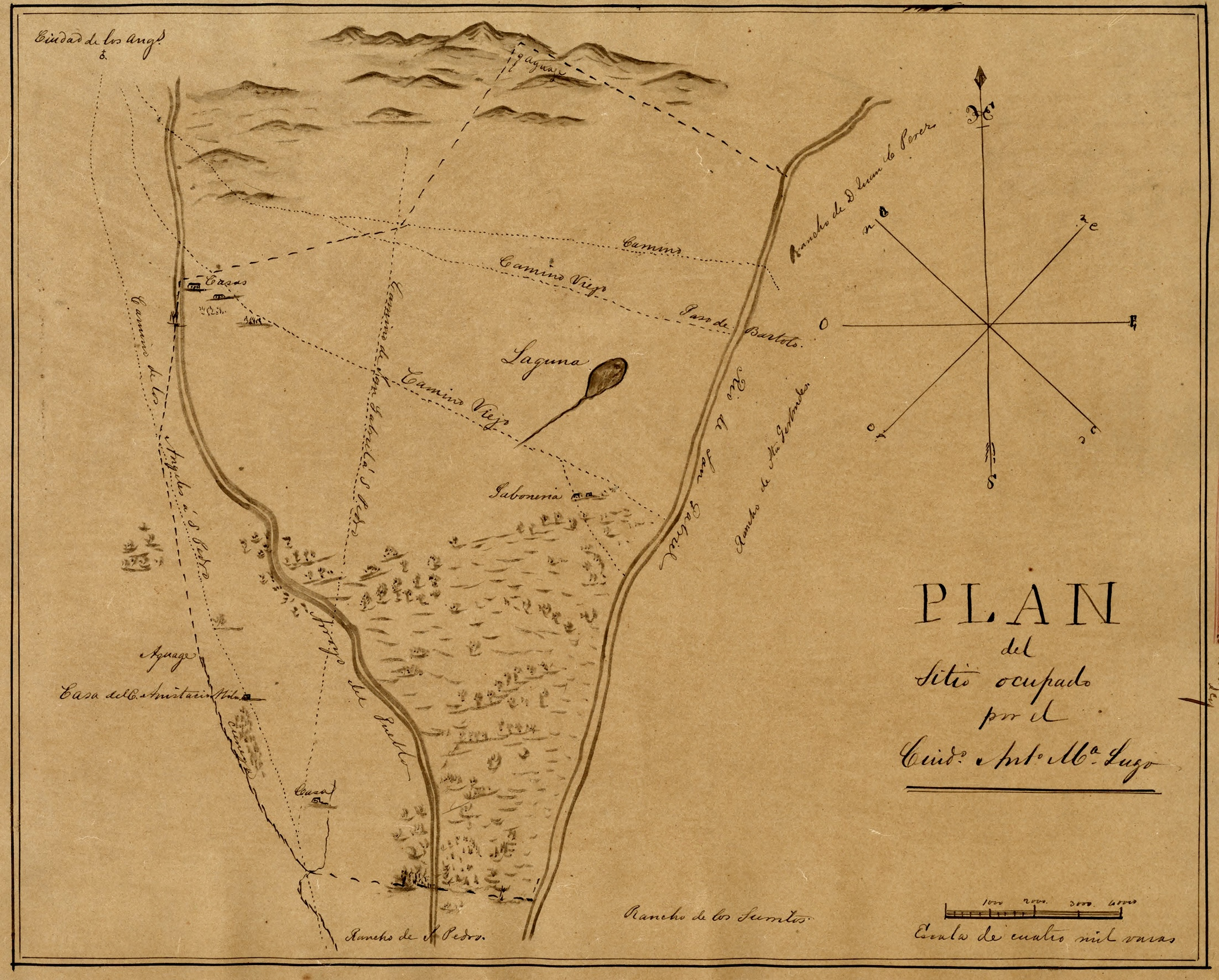
1852 diseño of Rancho San Antonio showing Carpenter's jabonería. (South of the laguna.)

Carpenter was in the Alta California Territory of Mexico by January 1833, arriving in the company of trappers Cyrus Alexander, William Chard, Joseph Paulding, and Albert Toomes. He later arrived in the Pueblo de Los Ángeles with the Ewing Young party of trappers along with Isaac "Julián" Williams and Moses Carson.

Upon his arrival, Carpenter started a soap manufacturing business and set up his jabonería (soap factory) at Chokishgna, a Tongva-Gabrieleño village west of the San Gabriel River, in Rancho San Antonio. The location of the jabonería was near the present-day crossing of the Interstate 5 and the Río Hondo in Bell Gardens. He followed the practice of the California missions' indigenous people and used the abundant native amole plant as an alkali to produce hard soap. The Historical Society of Southern California would later credit him as the first commercial soap manufacturer in Southern California. His business profited sufficiently for him to purchase Rancho Santa Gertrudes, which included the Tongva village of Nacaugna, now Downey, California, southeast of what is now downtown Los Angeles.

By the late 1830s, was among the first of the Americans to plant a vineyard for the making of wine.

In the 1836 padrón or census of Los Angeles, he was listed as Samuel Carpenter and was one of fifty foreigners living in the pueblo. Early California settler John Bidwell first saw the Pueblo de Los Ángeles in March 1845 and, years later, would list Lemuel Carpenter as one of the settlers of the pueblo who he recalled out of about 250 residents.

His original settlement was known as "Carpenter's Farm" from 1837 until it was destroyed by a flood in 1867. He tried gold mining, and in general prospered in his new home. A popular travel guide notes: "Rancho Santa Gertrudes…was sold to Lemuel Carpenter, a Kentuckian, who married the beautiful María de los Angeles Domínguez. ... The Carpenters [were] happy and prosperous under Mexican rule".

Carpenter was active in revolutionary activities and sided with the Americans during the Mexican–American War. He was held as a prisoner of war and on September 30, 1846, he was received by American forces during a prisoner exchange between Californio forces and detachments of Companies B and D of the California Battalion and Los Angeles volunteers under the command of Archibald H. Gillespe.

Rancho Santa Gertrudes was owned by Lemuel Carpenter until 1859. In 1859 the rancho was sold at sheriff's auction to John G. Downey and James P. McFarland. "Samuel", actually "Lemuel" but misspelled by the recorder, Carpenter was recorded as the legal possessor as late as 1862.

== Family ==
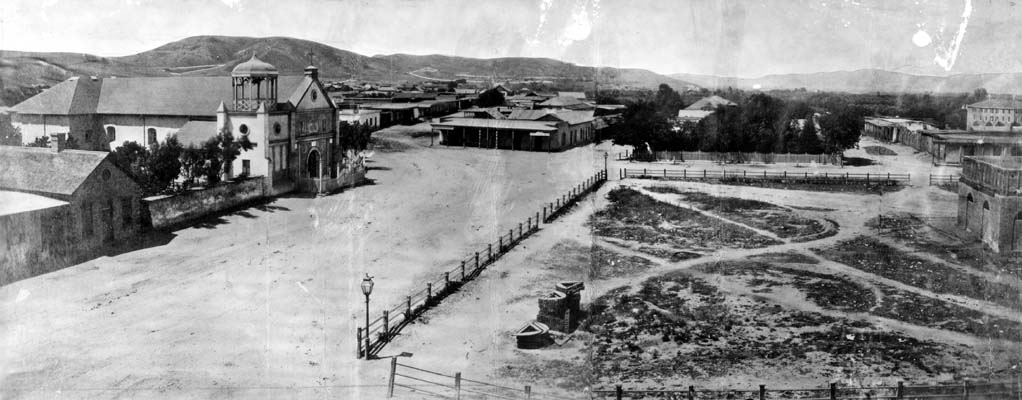
Dating from the era of the Pueblo de Los Ángeles, The Plaza and "Old Plaza Church" (Mission Nuestra Señora Reina de los Angeles) in 1869.

Lemuel's father is believed to be Jonathan Carpenter (c. 1785 Virginia-c. 1853 Missouri) and grandson of Matthew Carpenter (c. 1761 Virginia-c. 1798 Virginia).

In the 1850 census, Lemuel Carpenter is listed as age 42, with a real estate value of $8,000, a farmer. His wife, Maria, is listed as age 22 — she was his second wife. His children, all born in California, are listed as:

- Susana Carpenter, age 11.
- José Antonio Carpenter, age 9 (born November 20, 1837; descendants still live in Los Angeles)
- Refugio Carpenter, age 6.
- Francisco Carpenter, age 3.

== Misfortune and Death ==
Carpenter's prosperity took a precipitous downturn when a $5,000 loan from John G. Downey taken out in 1852 ballooned into a $104,000 debt by 1859. Unable to repay the debt, he eventually killed himself.

The diary of Lemuel Carpenter's daughter Mary Refugio Carpenter includes this entry written on January 2, 1861: "I have been thinking so much of my father tonight. It made me weep."
