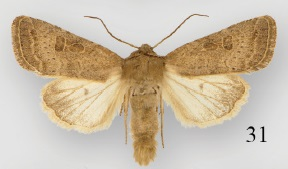
- Male
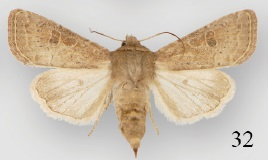
- Female

Scientific classification
- Domain: Eukaryota
- Kingdom: Animalia
- Phylum: Arthropoda
- Class: Insecta
- Order: Lepidoptera
- Superfamily: Noctuoidea
- Family: Noctuidae
- Genus: Protorthodes
- Species: P. perforata

Binomial name
- Protorthodes perforata (Grote, 1883)

Synonyms
- Taeniocampa perforata Grote, 1883; Eriopyga constans Dyar, 1918; Protorthodes constans

= Protorthodes perforata =

Species of moth

Protorthodes perforata is a moth in the family Noctuidae first described by Augustus Radcliffe Grote in 1883. It is found across the southern United States, from western Texas to southern California and southward to central Mexico.

The length of the forewings is 12–14 mm. The forewings exhibit a pale, whitish gray to buffy gray coloration, adorned with darker gray reniform and orbicular spots, each distinguished by their outline accentuated by a contrasting pale line. The hindwings are dirty white with fuscous shading on the margins and veins in both sexes. Adults have been recorded on wing from early April to early July and again from mid-August to late October.
