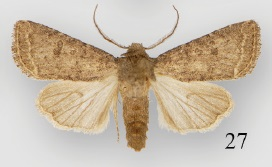
- Male
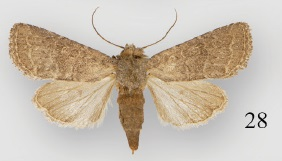
- Female

Scientific classification
- Domain: Eukaryota
- Kingdom: Animalia
- Phylum: Arthropoda
- Class: Insecta
- Order: Lepidoptera
- Superfamily: Noctuoidea
- Family: Noctuidae
- Genus: Protorthodes
- Species: P. texicana

Binomial name
- Protorthodes texicana Lafontaine, 2014

= Protorthodes texicana =

Species of moth

Protorthodes texicana is a moth in the family Noctuidae first described by J. Donald Lafontaine in 2014. It is known from west-central Texas and southern Mexico.

The length of the forewings is 12–14 mm. The forewings are pale brown with a dusting of darker-brown scales. The subbasal, antemedial, postmedial and subterminal lines are buff, partially bordered by darker-brown scales. The reniform spot is gray brown, darker than the forewing and with a pale-buff outline, as well as a slight constriction on the anterior and posterior margin. The orbicular spot is similar in color. The hindwings are pale fuscous, basally with darker fuscous on the discal spot, the veins and the marginal area. Adults are on wing from late March to late May and in early October.

== Etymology ==
The species name is derived from Texas and Mexico, the two areas from which it has been recorded.
