= Swiss People's Party =

Swiss political party

Swiss People's Party / Democratic Union of the Centre: Schweizerische Volkspartei (German); Union démocratique du centre (French); Unione Democratica di Centro (Italian); Partida populara Svizra (Romansh)
- German-language logo
- Abbreviation: SVP; PPS; UDC
- President: Marcel Dettling
- Members in Federal Council: Albert Rösti; Guy Parmelin
- Founded: 22 September 1971
- Merger of: BGB; Democratic Party
- Headquarters: Brückfeldstrasse 18, 3001 Bern
- Youth wing: Young SVP
- Membership (2015): 90,000
- Ideology: National conservatism; Economic liberalism; Right-wing populism; Historical: Agrarianism
- Political position: Right-wing to far-right
- European affiliation: None (Note: The party is not an official member of any European political party, but its three members in the Parliamentary Assembly of the Council of Europe sit with ALDE-PACE, and its youth wing is a member of the European Young Conservatives.)
- Colours: Green
- Slogan: Swiss quality, the party of the middle class.
- Federal Council: 2 / 7
- National Council: 62 / 200
- Council of States: 6 / 46
- Cantonal executives: 27 / 154
- Cantonal legislatures: 574 / 2,544

Website
- svp.ch (in German)

The Swiss People's Party (German: Schweizerische Volkspartei, SVP; Romansh: Partida populara Svizra, PPS), called in French and Italian the Democratic Union of the Centre (French: Union démocratique du centre, UDC; Italian: Unione Democratica di Centro, UDC), is a national-conservative and right-wing populist political party in Switzerland. Chaired by Marcel Dettling, it is the largest party in the Federal Assembly, with 62 members of the National Council and 6 of the Council of States.

The SVP originated in 1971 as a merger of the Party of Farmers, Traders and Independents (BGB) and the Democratic Party, while the BGB, in turn, had been founded in the context of the emerging local farmers' parties in the late 1910s. The SVP initially did not enjoy any increased support beyond that of the BGB, retaining around 11% of the vote through the 1970s and 1980s. This changed however during the 1990s, when the party underwent deep structural and ideological changes under the influence of Christoph Blocher, and had become the strongest party in Switzerland by the 2000s.

In line with the changes fostered by Blocher, the party started to focus increasingly on issues such as Euroscepticism and opposition to mass immigration. Its vote share of 28.9% in the 2007 federal election was the highest vote ever recorded for a single party in Switzerland until 2015, when it surpassed its own record with 29.4%. Blocher's failure to win re-election as a Federal Councillor led to moderates within the party splitting to form the Conservative Democratic Party (BDP), which later merged with the Christian Democratic People's Party into The Centre. As of 2024, the party is the largest in the National Council with 62 seats. It has six seats in the Council of States.

== History ==
=== Background, farmers' parties ===
The early origins of the SVP go back to the late 1910s, when numerous cantonal farmers' parties were founded in agrarian, Protestant, German-speaking parts of Switzerland. While the Free Democratic Party had earlier been a popular party for farmers, this changed during World War I when the party had mainly defended the interests of industrialists and consumer circles. When proportional representation was introduced in 1919, the new farmers' parties won significant electoral support, especially in Zürich and Bern, and eventually also gained representation in parliament and government. By 1929, the coalition of farmers' parties had gained enough influence to get one of their leaders, Rudolf Minger, elected to the Federal Council.

In 1936, a representative party was founded on the national level, called the Party of Farmers, Traders and Independents (BGB). During the 1930s, the BGB entered the mainstream of Swiss politics as a right-wing conservative party in the bourgeois bloc. While the party opposed any kind of socialist ideas such as internationalism and anti-militarism, it sought to represent local Swiss traders and farmers against big business and international capital.

The BGB contributed strongly to the establishment of the Swiss national ideology known as the Geistige Landesverteidigung (Spiritual Defence of the Nation), which was largely responsible for the growing Swiss sociocultural and political cohesion from the 1930s. In the party's fight against left-wing ideologies, sections of party officials and farmers voiced sympathy with, or failed to distance themselves from, emerging fascist movements. After World War II, the BGB contributed to the establishment of the characteristic Swiss post-war consensual politics, social agreements and economic growth policies. The party continued to be a reliable political partner with the Swiss Conservative People's Party and the Free Democratic Party.

=== Early years (1971–1980s) ===
In 1971, the BGB changed its name to the Swiss People's Party (SVP) after it merged with the Democratic Party from Glarus and Grisons. The Democratic Party had been supported particularly by workers, and the SVP sought to expand its electoral base towards these, as the traditional BGB base in the rural population had started to lose its importance in the post-war era. As the Democratic Party had represented centrist, social-liberal positions, the course of the SVP shifted towards the political centre following internal debates. The new party however continued to see its level of support at around 11%, the same as the former BGB throughout the post-war era. Internal debates continued, and the 1980s saw growing conflicts between the Bern and Zürich cantonal branches, where the former branch represented the centrist faction, and the latter looked to put new issues on the political agenda.

When the young entrepreneur Christoph Blocher was elected president of the Zürich SVP in 1977, he declared his intent to oversee significant change in the political line of the Zürich SVP, bringing an end to debates that aimed to open the party up to a wide array of opinions. Blocher soon consolidated his power in Zürich, and began to renew the organisational structures, activities, campaigning style and political agenda of the local branch. The young members of the party was boosted with the establishment of a cantonal Young SVP (JSVP) in 1977, as well as political training courses. The ideology of the Zürich branch was also reinforced, and the rhetoric hardened, which resulted in the best election result for the Zürich branch in fifty years in the 1979 federal election, with an increase from 11.3% to 14.5%. This was contrasted with the stable level in the other cantons, although the support also stagnated in Zürich through the 1980s.

=== Rise of the new SVP (1990s–present) ===
The struggle between the SVP's largest branches of Bern and Zürich continued into the early 1990s. While the Bern-oriented faction represented the old moderate style, the Zürich-oriented wing led by Christoph Blocher represented a new radical right-wing populist agenda. The Zürich wing began to politicise asylum issues, and the question of European integration started to dominate Swiss political debates. They also adopted more confrontational methods. The Zürich wing subsequently started to gain ground in the party at the expense of the Bern wing, and the party became increasingly centralised as a national party, in contrast to the traditional Swiss system of parties with loose organisational structures and weak central powers. During the 1990s, the party also doubled its number of cantonal branches (to eventually be represented in all cantons), which strengthened the power of the Zürich wing, since most new sections supported their agenda.

In 1991, the party for the first time became the strongest party in Zürich, with 20.2% of the vote. The party broke through in the early 1990s in both Zürich and Switzerland as a whole, and experienced dramatically increasing results in elections. From being the smallest of the four governing parties at the start of the 1990s, the party by the end of the decade emerged as the strongest party in Switzerland. At the same time, the party expanded its electoral base towards new voter demographics. The SVP in general won its best results in cantons where the cantonal branches adopted the agenda of the Zürich wing. In the 1999 federal election, the SVP for the first time became the strongest party in Switzerland with 22.5% of the vote, a 12.6% share increase. This was the biggest increase of votes for any party in the entire history of the Swiss proportional electoral system, which was introduced in 1919.

As a result of the remarkable increase in the SVP's popularity, the party gained a second ministerial position in the Federal Council in 2003, which was taken by Christoph Blocher. Before this, the only SVP Federal Councillor had always been from the moderate Bern wing. (Note: The Swiss Federal Council is based on a consensus model called the magic formula, whereby seats in the seven-member Federal Council are assigned according to each of the four major parties' shares of the latest general election.) The 2007 federal election still confirmed the SVP as the strongest party in Switzerland with 28.9% of the vote and 62 seats in the National Council, the largest share of the vote for any single party ever in Switzerland. However, the Federal Council refused to re-elect Blocher, who was replaced by Eveline Widmer-Schlumpf of the moderate Graubünden branch. In response, the national SVP withdrew its support from Widmer-Schlumpf and its other Federal Councillor, fellow SVP moderate Samuel Schmid, from the party, along with Widmer-Schlumpf's whole cantonal section. The SVP thus formed the first opposition group in Switzerland since the 1950s.

In 2008, the SVP demanded that Widmer-Schlumpf resign from the Federal Council and leave the party. When she refused, the SVP demanded that its Grisons branch expel her. Since Swiss parties are legally federations of cantonal parties, the federal SVP could not expel her itself. The Grisons branch stood by Widmer-Schlumpf, leading the SVP to expel it from the party. Shortly afterward, the Grisons branch reorganised itself as the Conservative Democratic Party (BDP). Soon afterward, virtually all of the SVP's Bern branch, including Schmid, defected to the new party. The SVP regained its position in government in late 2008, when Schmid was forced to resign due to a political scandal, and was replaced with Ueli Maurer.

The 2011 federal election put an end to the continuous progression of the SVP since 1987. The party drew 26.6% percent of the vote, a 2.3-point decrease from the previous elections in 2007. This loss could be partly attributed to the split of the BDP, which gained 5.4% of the vote in 2011. However the SVP rebounded strongly in the 2015 federal election, gathering a record 29.4% of the national vote and 65 seats in parliament. Media attributed the rise to concerns over the European migrant crisis. The party received the highest proportion of votes of any Swiss political party since 1919, when proportional representation was first introduced, and it received more seats in the National Council than any other political party since 1963, when the number of seats was set at 200. The SVP gained a second member in the Federal Council again, with Guy Parmelin replacing Eveline Widmer-Schlumpf after the party's election gains.

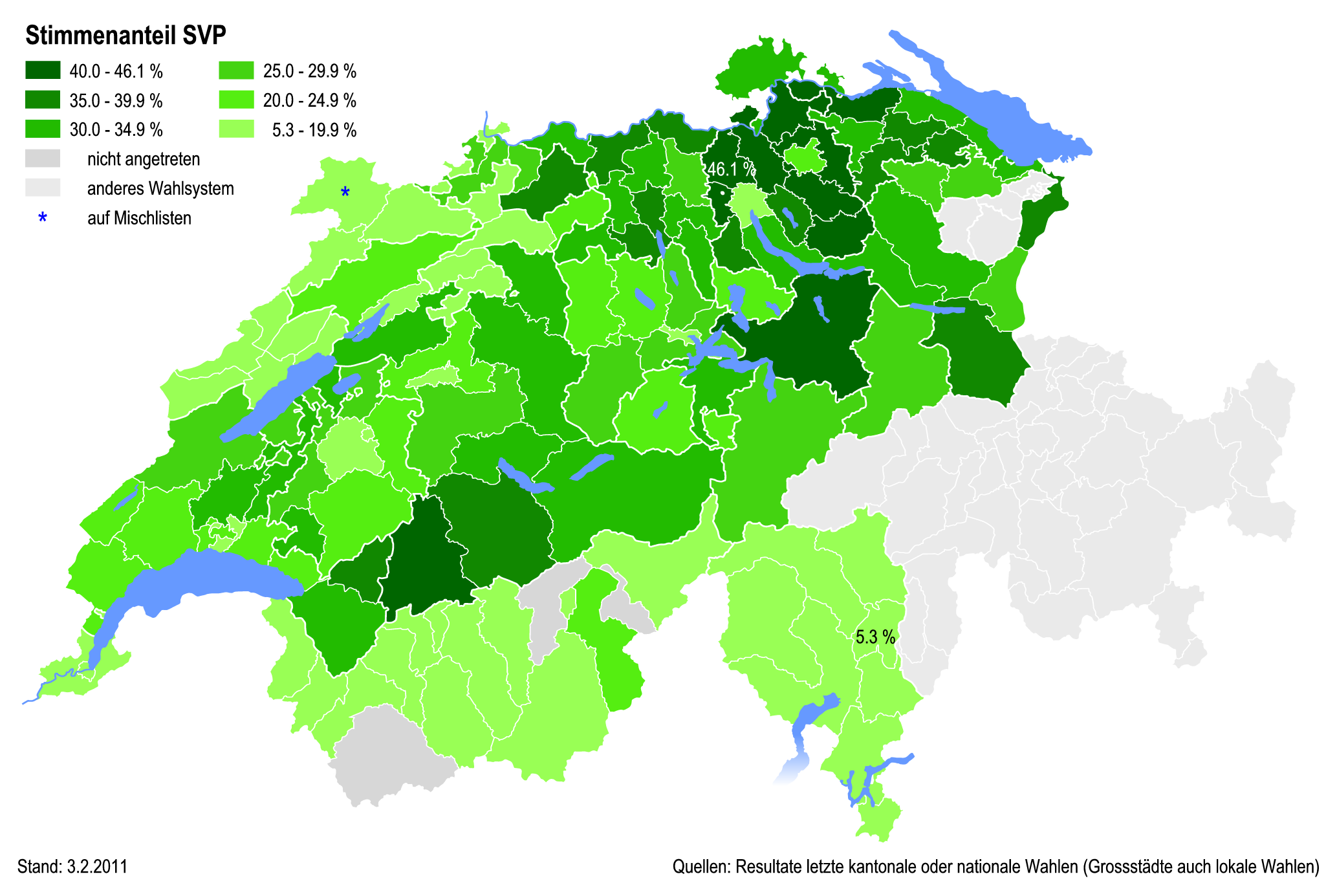
Percentages of the SVP at district level in 2011

== Ideology ==
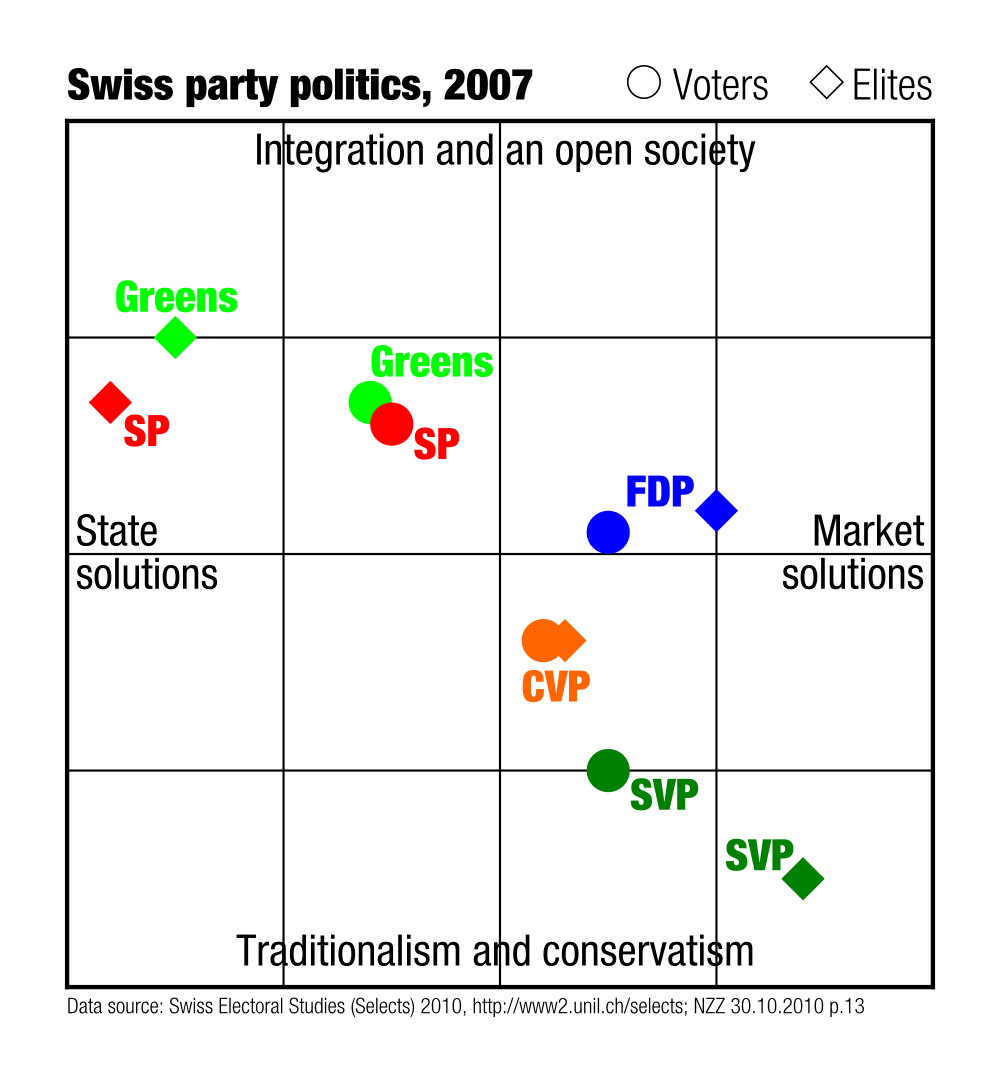
The SVP's positions in the Swiss political spectrum (2007)

The SVP adheres to national conservatism, aiming at the preservation of Switzerland's political sovereignty and a conservative society. Furthermore, the party promotes the principle of individual responsibility and is skeptical toward any expansion of governmental services. This stance is most evident in the rejection of an accession of Switzerland to the European Union, the rejection of military involvement abroad, and the rejection of increases in government spending on social welfare and education. The SVP "does not reject either democracy or the liberal order," and according to some observers the terms "right-wing populist" or "far-right" are rarely used to describe it in Switzerland.

The emphasis of the party's policies lies in foreign policy, immigration and homeland security policy as well as tax and social welfare policy. Among political opponents, the SVP has gained a reputation as a party that maintains a hard-line stance.

=== Foreign policy ===
In its foreign policy the SVP opposes the growing involvement of Switzerland in intergovernmental and especially supranational organisations, including the UN, EEA, EU, Schengen and Dublin treaties, and closer ties with NATO. The party stands for a strict neutrality of the country and the preservation of the strong role of the Swiss Armed Forces as the institution responsible for national defense. They believe that the army should remain a militia force and should never become involved in interventions abroad.

In June and July 2010, the party used the silly season for floating the notion of a "Greater Switzerland", where instead of Switzerland joining the EU, the border regions of Switzerland's neighbours would join Switzerland, submitted in July in the form of a motion to the Federal Council by Dominique Baettig, signed by 26 SVP Councillors. Some, such as newspaper Die Welt, have also speculated that the initiative could be a response to the suggestion by Muammar al-Gaddafi to dissolve Switzerland and divide its territory among its neighbouring countries.

Another key concern of the SVP is what it alleges is an increasing influence of the judiciary on politics. According to the SVP, this influence, especially through international law, increasingly puts the Swiss direct democracy in question. Public law which is legitimate by direct democracy standards should be agreed upon by the federal court. The European law, which according to the SVP is not democratically legitimate, shall always be subordinate to the Swiss law. The SVP also criticises the judiciary as undemocratic because the courts have made decisions against the will of the majority.

=== Immigration and Islam ===
Poster, with the slogan "To Create Security", derived from the SVP's 2007 proposal of a new law which would authorise the deportation of criminal foreigners

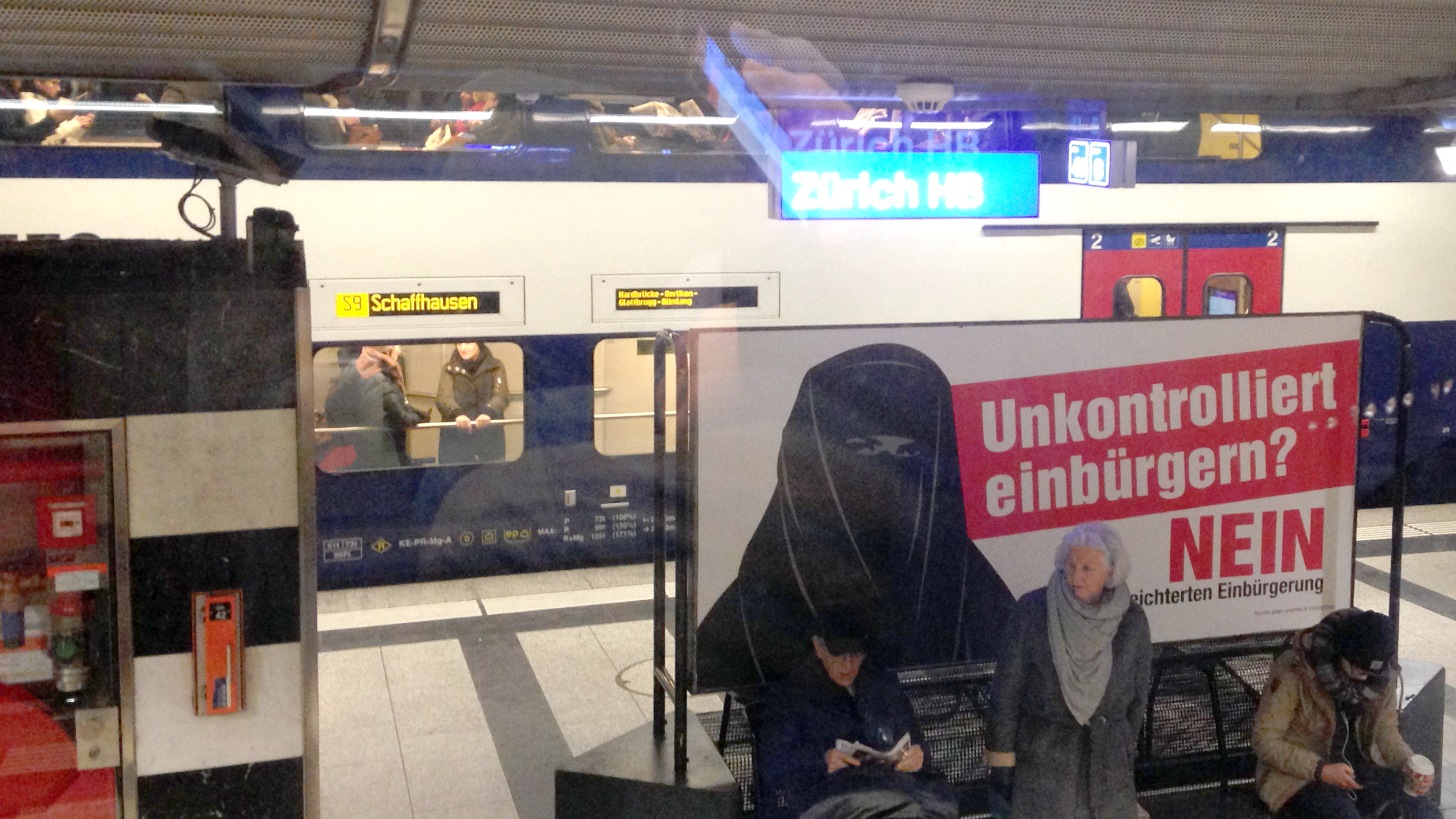
SVP poster against "uncontrolled" Muslim immigration

In its immigration policy, the party commits itself to make asylum laws stricter and to reduce immigration. The SVP warns of immigration into the social welfare system and criticises the high proportion of foreigners among the public insurance benefit recipients and other social welfare programs. It addresses fears of a loss of prosperity in Switzerland due to immigrants. According to the opinion of the party, such benefits amount to waste of taxpayers' money. Numerous SVP members have shown themselves to be critical of Islam by having participated in the minaret controversy, during which they pushed for an initiative to ban the construction of minarets. In November 2009, this ban won the majority vote (57.5%) and became an amendment to the Swiss Constitution. However, the four existing minarets are not affected by the new legislation. The party has been active in the counter-jihad movement, participating in the 2010 international counter-jihad conference. Other recent victories of the SVP in regards to immigration policy include the federal popular initiatives "for the expulsion of criminal foreigners" (52.3%), and "Against mass immigration" (50.3%) in 2010 and 2014 respectively, all injecting counter-jihad policies into the political mainstream.

The 2014 referendum resulted in a narrow victory for the SVP. Following the vote, the Swiss government entered into negotiations with the EU and, in 2016, concluded an agreement that would provide for preferences for Swiss citizens in hiring. The SVP criticized the agreement as weak. In response, in 2020, the party placed the ballot a referendum called the "For Moderate Immigration" initiative, which would terminate the Free Movement of Persons bilateral agreement within one year of passage. It would also bar the government from concluding any agreements that would grant the free movement of people to foreign nationals. The initiative was opposed by the other major parties in Switzerland. Other parties were concerned that because of the "guillotine clause" in the bilateral agreements, this would terminate all of the Bilateral I agreements with the EU which include provisions on the reduction of trade barriers as well as barriers in agriculture, land transport and civil aviation. Swiss voters rejected the referendum with 61.7% against. Only four cantons voted in favor.

=== Economy ===
The SVP supports supply-side economics. It is a proponent of lower taxes and government spending. The SVP is not as liberal in terms of its agricultural policy since, in consideration of it being the most popular party among farmers, it refuses to reduce agricultural subsidies or curtail the current system of direct payments to farmers, to ensure larger farming businesses do not dominate the marketplace. The expansion of the Schengen Area eastward was looked at skeptically by the SVP, which it associated with economic immigration and higher crime rates.

=== Environment ===
In terms of the environment, transportation and energy policy the SVP opposes governmental measures for environmental protection. In its transportation policy, the party therefore endorses the expansion of the Swiss motorway network and is against the preference of public transportation over individual transportation. It supports the construction of megaprojects such as AlpTransit but criticizes the cost increases and demands more transparency. In the scope of environmentalism and energy policy, the SVP is against the carbon tax and supports the use of nuclear energy. In the context of reductions of CO_{2} emissions, the SVP cites the limited impact of Switzerland and instead supports globally, and legally binding agreements to address global climate change.

=== Social policy ===
In social welfare policy the SVP rejects expansion of the welfare state, and stands for a conservative society. It opposes the public financing of maternity leave and nursery schools. In its education policy, it opposes tendencies to shift the responsibility of the upbringing of children from families to public institutions. The party claims an excessive influence of anti-authoritarian ideas originating from the protests of 1968. In general, the party supports strengthening crime prevention measures against social crimes and, especially in the areas of social welfare policy and education policy, a return to meritocracy.

The SVP is skeptical toward governmental support of gender equality, and the SVP has the smallest proportion of women among parties represented in the Federal Assembly of Switzerland. It was the only major party represented in the Assembly to oppose the legalisation of same-sex marriage.

== Election results ==
=== National Council ===
Popular vote, 1919–2023. The SVP (until 1971 BGB, in dark green) in 1999 reduced to insignificance the right-wing Swiss Democrats and Freedom Party, which had reached their apex in 1991.

The Swiss People's Party is the largest party in the northeast of the country, including Zürich and Bern, and is the largest party in ten cantonal legislatures (coloured green above, as of 2022).

Map of Swiss cantons shaded by the party that won the most votes in elections to the National Council in 2015. The Swiss People's Party received the most votes in 16 of the 26 Swiss cantons (coloured green above).

Election	Votes	%	Seats	+/–
1971	217,908	11.1 (#4)	23 / 200	New
1975	190,445	9.9 (#4)	21 / 200	▼2
1979	210,425	11.6 (#4)	23 / 200	▲2
1983	215,457	11.1 (#4)	23 / 200	Steady
1987	211,535	11.0 (#4)	25 / 200	▲2
1991	240,353	11.9 (#4)	25 / 200	Steady
1995	280,420	14.9 (#4)	29 / 200	▲4
1999	440,159	22.5 (#1)	44 / 200	▲15
2003	561,817	26.6 (#1)	55 / 200	▲11
2007	672,562	28.9 (#1)	62 / 200	▲7
2011	641,106	26.6 (#1)	54 / 200	▼8
2015	740,954	29.4 (#1)	65 / 200	▲11
2019	620,343	25.59 (#1)	53 / 200	▼12
2023	713,471	27.93 (#1)	62 / 200	▲9

=== Party strength over time ===
Percentage of the total vote for the Swiss People's Party in Federal Elections 1971–2019
Canton	1971	1975	1979	1983	1987	1991	1995	1999	2003	2007	2011	2015	2019	2023
Switzerland	11.1	9.9	11.6	11.1	11.0	11.9	14.9	22.5	26.7	28.9	26.6	29.4	25.6	27.9
Zürich	12.2	11.3	14.5	13.8	15.2	20.2	25.5	32.5	33.4	33.9	29.8	30.7	26.7	27.4
Bern	29.2	27.1	31.5	29.0	27.8	26.3	26.0	28.6	29.6	33.6	29.0	33.1	30.0	30.9
Lucerne	*^{a}	*	*	*	*	*	14.1	22.8	22.9	25.3	25.1	28.5	24.7	25.8
Uri	*	*	*	*	*	*	*	*	31.3	*	*	44.1	36.3	35.3
Schwyz	*	3.0	*	6.5	7.6	9.2	21.5	35.9	43.6	45.0	38.0	42.6	36.9	35.9
Obwalden	*	*	*	*	*	*	*	*	33.6	32.9	43.1	34.5	37.3	52.3
Nidwalden	*	*	*	*	*	*	*	*	*	*	45.2	82.8	64.2	40.0
Glarus	*	*	81.8	92.3	85.6	42.8	*	*	*	35.1	*	*	*	42.6
Zug	*	*	*	*	*	*	15.2	21.4	27.7	29.1	28.3	30.5	26.6	30.2
Fribourg	8.7	4.3	6.4	8.8	8.9	9.7	8.3	11.4	21.4	22.0	21.4	25.9	20.2	25.8
Solothurn	*	*	*	*	*	*	6.7	18.6	22.5	27.1	24.3	28.8	25.9	28.7
Basel-Stadt	*	*	*	*	*	2.0	*	13.6	18.6	18.5	16.5	17.6	12.4	13.6
Basel-Landschaft	11.8	10.7	10.6	11.2	12.0	12.3	10.8	18.0	26.5	28.5	26.9	29.8	25.1	28.9
Schaffhausen	*	*	21.1	22.6	23.5	19.2	20.4	26.0	28.5	39.1	39.9	45.3	39.5	39.1
Appenzell A.Rh.	*	*	*	*	*	*	22.0	37.5	38.3	*	30.5	36.1	49.5	47.7
Appenzell I.Rh.	*	*	*	*	*	*	*	25.7	*	*	*	*	29.1	2.4
St. Gallen	*	*	*	1.9	*	*	8.4	27.6	33.1	35.8	31.5	35.8	31.3	34.5
Graubünden	34.0	26.9	21.1	22.0	20.0	19.5	26.9	27.0	33.8	34.7	24.5	29.7	29.9	30.6
Aargau	12.5	12.8	13.9	14.1	15.7	17.9	19.8	31.8	34.6	36.2	34.7	38.0	31.5	35.5
Thurgau	26.0	25.1	26.4	22.8	21.7	23.7	27.0	33.2	41.0	42.3	38.7	39.9	36.7	40.3
Ticino	2.4	*	2.3	2.1	1.3	1.0	1.5	5.3	7.6	8.7	9.7	11.3	11.7	15.1
Vaud	7.7	8.0	6.8	6.2	6.2	7.3	7.8	10.7	20.3	22.4	22.9	22.6	17.4	19.2
Valais	*	*	*	*	*	*	*	9.0	13.4	16.6	19.7	22.1	19.8	24.5
Neuchâtel	*	*	*	*	*	*	*	*	22.5	23.2	21.4	20.4	12.7	17.3
Genève	*	*	*	*	*	1.1	*	7.5	18.3	21.1	16.0	17.6	13.7	15.3
Jura	^{b}	^{b}	*	2.0	*	*	*	7.2	8.3	13.7	15.5	12.8	14.5	19.1

1.^a* Indicates that the party was not on the ballot in this canton
2.^bPart of the Canton of Bern until 1979

== Leadership ==
- Hans Conzett (1971–1976)
- Fritz Hofmann (1976–1984)
- Adolf Ogi (1984–1988)
- Hans Uhlmann (1988–1995)
- Ueli Maurer (1996–2008)
- Toni Brunner (2008–2016)
- Albert Rösti (2016–2020)
- Marco Chiesa (2020–2024)
- Marcel Dettling (2024–present)

== See also ==
- Campaign for an Independent and Neutral Switzerland
- List of political parties in Switzerland
- Swiss Democrats

== Bibliography ==
- Geden, Oliver (2006). Diskursstrategien im Rechtspopulismus: Freiheitliche Partei Österreichs und Schweizerische Volkspartei zwischen Opposition und Regierungsbeteiligung. VS Verlag. ISBN 978-3-531-15127-4.
- Skenderovic, Damir (2009). The radical right in Switzerland: continuity and change, 1945-2000. Berghahn Books. ISBN 978-1-84545-580-4.
- Cormon, Pierre (2014). Swiss Politics for Complete Beginners. Editions Slatkine. ISBN 978-2-8321-0607-5. Archived from the original on 4 November 2014.
