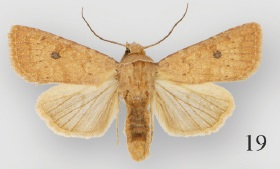
- Male
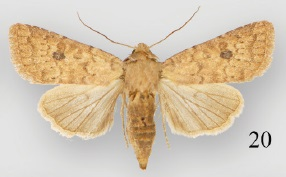
- Female

Scientific classification
- Domain: Eukaryota
- Kingdom: Animalia
- Phylum: Arthropoda
- Class: Insecta
- Order: Lepidoptera
- Superfamily: Noctuoidea
- Family: Noctuidae
- Genus: Protorthodes
- Species: P. mulina

Binomial name
- Protorthodes mulina (Schaus, 1894)

Synonyms
- Taeniocampa mulina Schaus, 1894; Hyssia pseudochroma Dyar, 1913

= Protorthodes mulina =

Species of moth

Protorthodes mulina is a moth in the family Noctuidae first described by William Schaus in 1894. It probably has a wide range in Mexico, occurring as far south as the state of Chiapas, but is known from very few localities. In the United States it occurs from western Texas to southeastern Arizona.

The length of the forewings is 13–17 mm. The ground color of the forewings is orange or yellow orange with darker orange-brown lines. Adults are on wing in May and June and again from mid-August to early November, probably in two generations.
