= Payne's Creek =

River in California, United States

Coordinates: 40°15′37″N 122°11′15″W

Payne's Creek is a 33.7-mile-long (54.2 km) natural watercourse in Tehama County, California. The creek was apparently originally called Paines Creek according to an 1879 land survey map of the area. The town of Paynes Creek was named after the creek. The creek most likely was named after James S. Payne, the proprietor of a local sawmill.

The Payne's Creek watershed contains forested reaches, and also provides habitat for numerous understory flora and fauna. An example wildflower found in the watershed is the poppy Calochortus luteus, which is at its northern limit at the location of the Payne's Creek watershed.

== See also ==
- Dye Creek
- List of rivers of California
