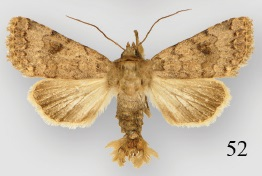
- Nudorthodes

Scientific classification
- Kingdom: Animalia
- Phylum: Arthropoda
- Class: Insecta
- Order: Lepidoptera
- Superfamily: Noctuoidea
- Family: Noctuidae
- Subfamily: Noctuinae
- Genus: Nudorthodes; Lafontaine, Walsh & Ferris, 2014

= Nudorthodes =

Genus of moths

Nudorthodes is the genus of moths of the family Noctuidae erected by three lepidopterologists, J. Donald Lafontaine, J. Bruce Walsh and Clifford D. Ferris in 2014.

== Species ==
- Nudorthodes molino Lafontaine, Walsh & Ferris, 2014
- Nudorthodes texana (Smith, 1900)
- Nudorthodes variabilis (Barnes & McDunnough, 1912)

== Etymology ==
The generic name refers to the fact that the species in the genus are removed from the other members of the Orthodes-group of genera by the lack of hairs on the surface of the eye. It is derived from Latin nudus (meaning bare) plus the genus name Orthodes.
