= Molino de Pérez =

Coordinates: 34°53′46.4″S 56°5′43.13″W

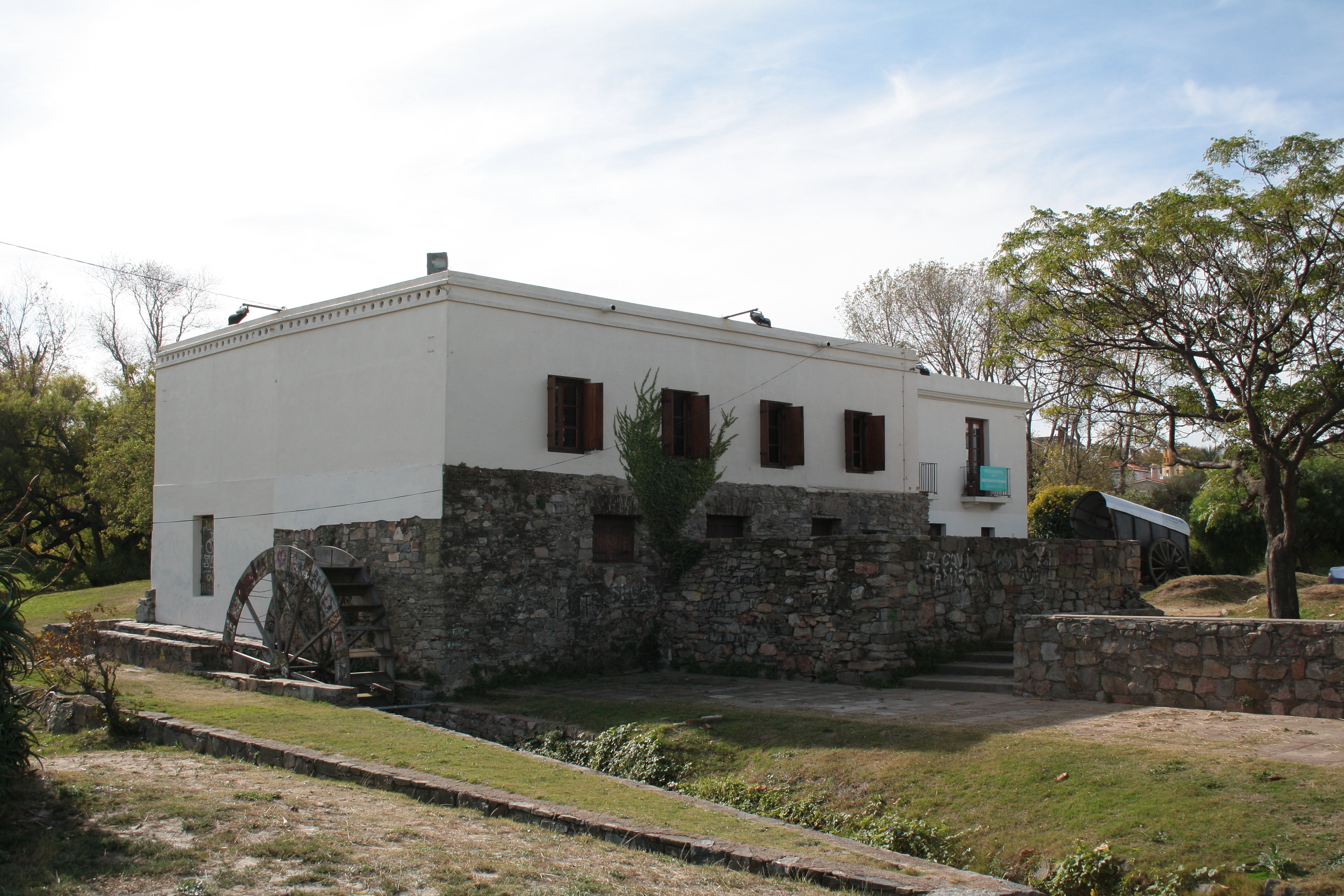
Molino de Perez

The Molino de Pérez is a watermill which was built by the Uruguayan merchant Juan María Pérez in 1840. It's located in what nowadays is known as the Veltroni Passage, near Rambla O´Higgins (the promenade of Montevideo) and Alejandro Gallinal. It became a national historical heritage in 1975.

== Location ==
It is located in the Parque Baroffio (in English: Baroffio Park) between the barrios (neighborhoods) of Malvín and Punta Gorda, in the department of Montevideo.

== History ==
The building was constructed by Juan María Pérez in 1840. It was originally a milling industry, due to the fact that Pérez grew wheat along his own surrounding lands. It had a running watermill which worked due to the Malvin stream that flowed nearby, but it suffered damage over the years and in 1950 a reconstruction of the wheel was planned in “Abra del Perdomo”, Maldonado Department. Horacio Arredondo was in charge of this construction. The stone walls remain from the original building, but the most touristic feature of the watermill is its mechanism inside. The structure has 2 levels. It was constructed with stone and in some original parts with brick. The floor is wood. In the 1950 restoration large windows were added to the sides of the building so that the machinery could be seen from outside.
