= Molinos de viento =

Molinos de viento may refer to:

- "Molinos de viento" (Mägo de Oz song), 1998
- Molinos de viento (zarzuela), by Spanish composer Pablo Luna
