= Los Molinos, Chile =

Los Molinos
- List of towns in Chile
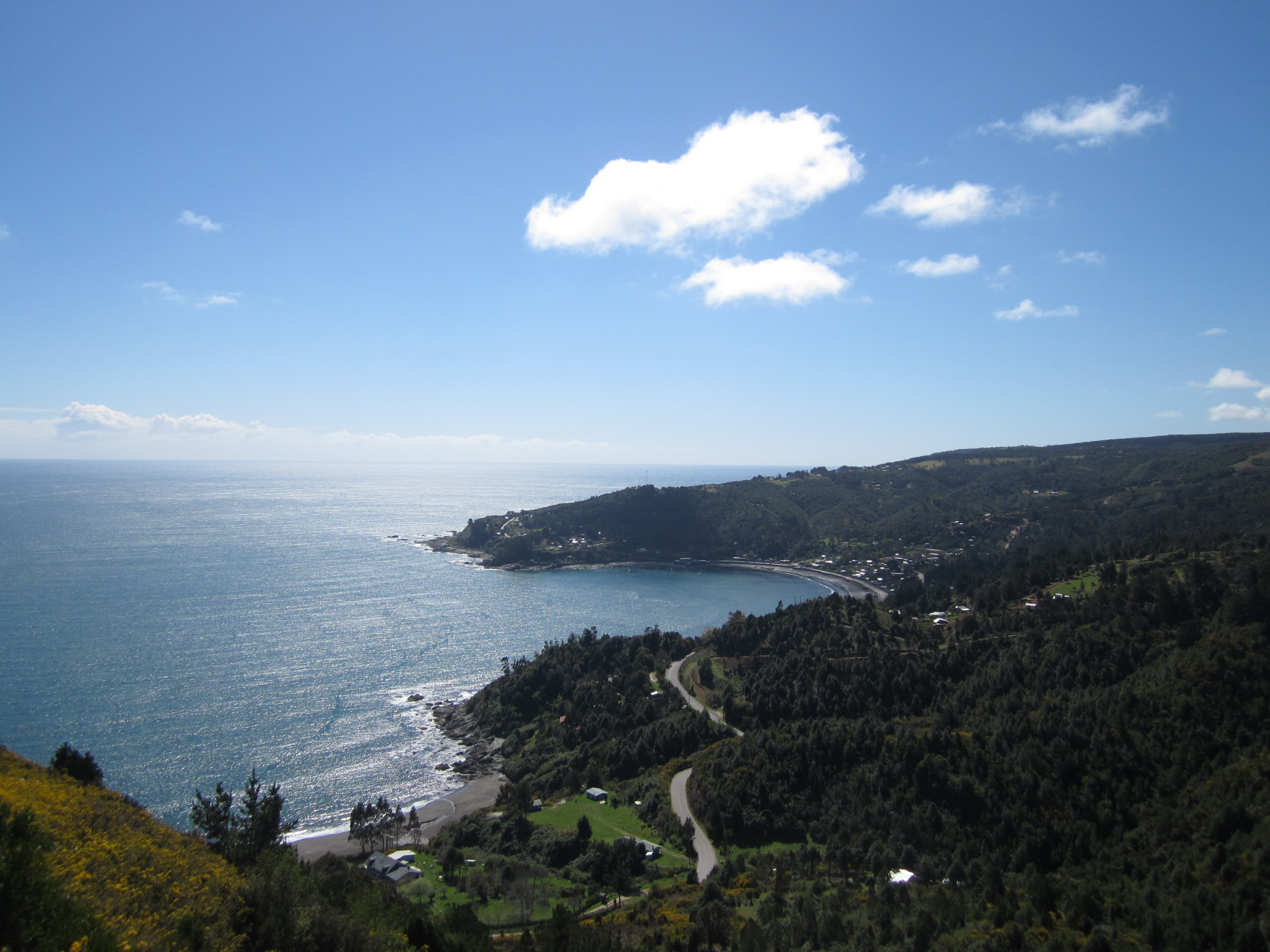
- Los Molinos village and cove as seen in January 2014.

- Location in Chile
- Coordinates: 39°50′46″S 73°23′36″W
- Country: Chile
- Admin. division: Los Ríos Region
- Province: Valdivia Province
- Commune: Valdivia

Los Molinos is a Chilean village and harbour in the commune of Valdivia in Valdivia Province, Los Ríos Region. It is located just north of Niebla and a few kilometers south of Curiñanco.

== See also ==
- List of towns in Chile
