= Los Molinos, La Rioja =

Coordinates: 28°44′S 66°56′W

Los Molinos
- Municipality and village
- Interactive map of Los Molinos
- Country: Argentina
- Province: La Rioja Province
- Time zone: UTC−3 (ART)

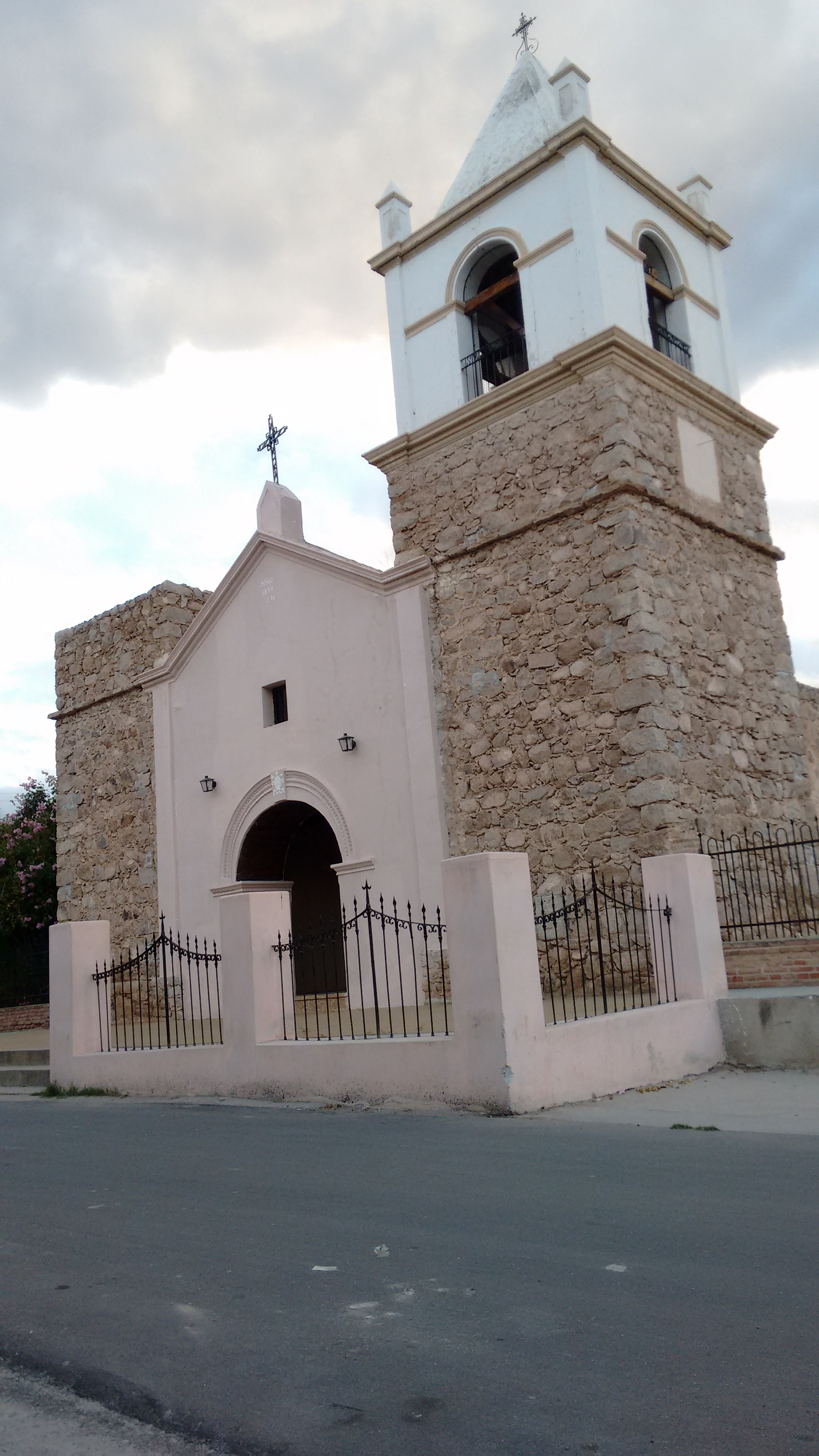
Church of Los Molinos, Argentina

Los Molinos is a municipality and village in La Rioja Province in northwestern Argentina.
