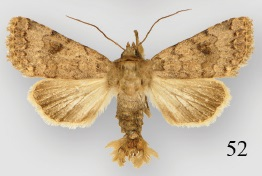
- Male
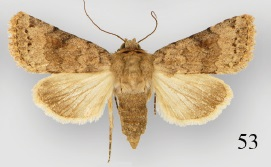
- Female

Scientific classification
- Domain: Eukaryota
- Kingdom: Animalia
- Phylum: Arthropoda
- Class: Insecta
- Order: Lepidoptera
- Superfamily: Noctuoidea
- Family: Noctuidae
- Genus: Nudorthodes
- Species: N. molino

Binomial name
- Nudorthodes molino Lafontaine, Walsh & Ferris, 2014

= Nudorthodes molino =

Species of moth

Nudorthodes molino is a moth in the family Noctuidae first described by J. Donald Lafontaine, J. Bruce Walsh and Clifford D. Ferris in 2014. It is found in the western US in southeastern Arizona and southwestern New Mexico.

The length of the forewings is 13–15 mm. The forewing ground color is pale brown with a dusting of darker brown scales, especially in the outer part of the medial area, the outer part of subterminal area and usually in the terminal area. The subbasal, antemedial and postmedial lines are dark brown and there is a subterminal line consisting of a series of pale-buff dots with dark brown shading proximally that highlights the line. The reniform spot is kidney shaped, infuscated with dark-brown shading from the medial line. The orbicular spot is rounded and generally paler than the ground color and outlined by a thin dark-brown line. The hindwings are pale fuscous basally with darker fuscous toward the margin. Adults have been recorded on wing from late May to late June and from late August to early November.

== Etymology ==
The species is named after the Molino Basin on Mount Lemmon where most of the type series was collected.
