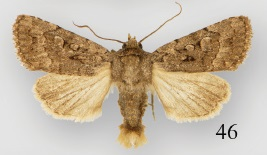
- Male

Scientific classification
- Domain: Eukaryota
- Kingdom: Animalia
- Phylum: Arthropoda
- Class: Insecta
- Order: Lepidoptera
- Superfamily: Noctuoidea
- Family: Noctuidae
- Genus: Nudorthodes
- Species: N. texana

Binomial name
- Nudorthodes texana (Smith, 1900)

Synonyms
- Perigea texana Smith, 1900; Protorthodes texana; Perigea consors Smith, 1900

= Nudorthodes texana =

Species of moth

Nudorthodes texana is a moth in the family Noctuidae first described by Smith in 1900. It is found in the US from the intermontane region of Washington, Oregon, Nevada and Utah southward to southern California and Arizona and southeastward to the Gulf Coast of Texas. The habitat consists of steppe regions, wet meadows and alfalfa fields.

The length of the forewings is 12–14 mm. The forewings are pale buffy brown or gray brown with darker shading around the reniform and orbicular spots and in the outer part of the subterminal area. Adults have been recorded on wing in March and again from mid-August to mid-November in two generations per year.

The larvae probably feed on various herbaceous plants, possibly including alfalfa.
