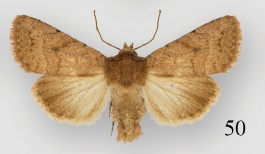
- Male

Scientific classification
- Domain: Eukaryota
- Kingdom: Animalia
- Phylum: Arthropoda
- Class: Insecta
- Order: Lepidoptera
- Superfamily: Noctuoidea
- Family: Noctuidae
- Genus: Nudorthodes
- Species: N. variabilis

Binomial name
- Nudorthodes variabilis (Barnes & McDunnough, 1912)

Synonyms
- Namangana variabilis Barnes & McDunnough, 1912; Protorthodes variabilis

= Nudorthodes variabilis =

Species of moth

Nudorthodes variabilis is a moth in the family Noctuidae first described by William Barnes and James Halliday McDunnough in 1912. It is found in the US along the coast of southern California, from Santa Barbara County to San Diego County.

The length of the forewings is 13–14 mm. The forewing ground color is usually even gray brown, sometimes with a slight reddish tint. The medial line is usually prominent, extending obliquely from the costa to the reniform spot and as a straight line from there to the hind margin. The lower third of the reniform spot is filled with a well-defined dark blue-gray patch. Adults have been recorded on wing from late August to mid-September.
