= Louis Sala-Molins =

Louis Sala-Molins (born 1935) is an essayist and political philosophy professor at Paris-I and Toulouse-II universities.

He took part in UNESCO Headquarters to events dedicated to the International Day for the Abolition of Slavery (December 2004). His field of work have been the works by Ramon Llull.

== Political and philosophical work (in French) ==
- Le racisme, Philippe Godard and Louis Sala-Molins, 2008
- Du crime d'être "noir". Un milliard de "Noirs" dans la prison identitaire, Homnisphères, 2006.
- Le livre rouge de Yahvé, La Dispute, 2004.
- La Loi, de quel droit ?, Flammarion, 1993.
- Louis Sala-Molins - L'Afrique aux Amériques. Le Code noir espagnol, Presses Universitaires de France, 1992.
- Les misères des Lumières. Sous la raison, l'outrage, Homnisphères, 1992.
- Sodome - Exergue à la philosophie du droit, Albin Michel, 1991.
- Le code noir, Presses Universitaires de France, 1987.
- Le Dictionnaire des inquisiteurs, Valence, 1494, Galilée, 1981.

== English translated work ==
- Dark Side of the Light: Slavery and the French Enlightenment, translated by John Conteh-Morgan, University of Minnesota Press, 2006.
