= Dye Creek =

River in California, United States

Coordinates: 40°4′4″N 122°6′43″W

Dye Creek is an 18.2-mile-long (29.3 km) watercourse in Tehama County, California, United States, that is a tributary to the Sacramento River. Dye Creek's watershed is situated in north-central California. The Dye Creek watershed contains rugged terrain areas of oak-studded forest, and also provides habitat for numerous understory flora and fauna. An example forb found in the watershed is the poppy Calochortus luteus, which is at its northern limit around the Dye Creek watershed.

Dye Creek was named for Job Dye, an early landowner.

Dye Creek Preserve is a large state holding managed by The Nature Conservancy that encompasses much of the Dye Creek watershed.

== See also ==
- Payne's Creek

== See also ==
- List of rivers of California
