= San José de los Molinos District =

Coordinates: 13.9329°S 75.6709°W

San José de los Molinos
- District
- Interactive map of San José de los Molinos
- Country: Peru
- Region: Ica
- Province: Ica
- Founded: June 14, 1876
- Capital: San José de los Molinos

Government
  - Mayor: Felix Benancio Escobar Huamancayo

Area
  - Total: 363.2 km^{2} (140.2 sq mi)
- Elevation: 535 m (1,755 ft)

Population (2005 census)
  - Total: 5,734
  - Density: 15.79/km^{2} (40.89/sq mi)
- Time zone: UTC-5 (PET)
- UBIGEO: 110109

San José de los Molinos District is one of fourteen districts of the province Ica in Peru.

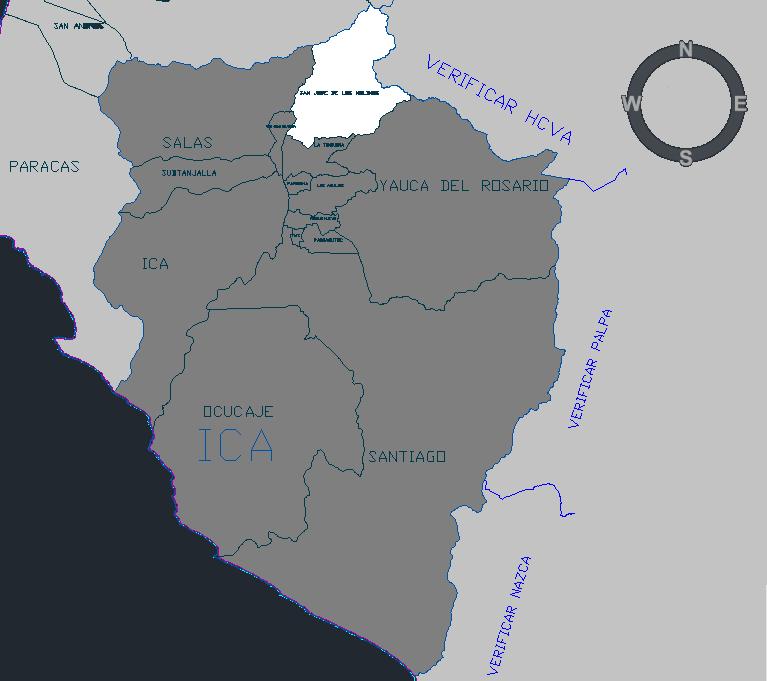
File:San Jose de los Molinos district within Ica province of Ica region, Peru.

== Climate ==
Climate data for Huamani, elevation 794 m (2,605 ft), (1991–2020)
Month	Jan	Feb	Mar	Apr	May	Jun	Jul	Aug	Sep	Oct	Nov	Dec	Year
Mean daily maximum °C (°F)	28.5 (83.3)	29.2 (84.6)	29.7 (85.5)	28.8 (83.8)	26.5 (79.7)	24.0 (75.2)	23.3 (73.9)	24.2 (75.6)	26.0 (78.8)	27.2 (81.0)	27.8 (82.0)	28.1 (82.6)	26.9 (80.5)
Mean daily minimum °C (°F)	16.8 (62.2)	17.9 (64.2)	18.0 (64.4)	16.6 (61.9)	13.8 (56.8)	11.1 (52.0)	9.8 (49.6)	9.8 (49.6)	11.1 (52.0)	12.4 (54.3)	13.4 (56.1)	15.3 (59.5)	13.8 (56.9)
Average precipitation mm (inches)	5.4 (0.21)	4.6 (0.18)	1.9 (0.07)	0.2 (0.01)	0 (0)	0 (0)	0 (0)	0 (0)	0 (0)	0 (0)	0.2 (0.01)	0.1 (0.00)	12.4 (0.48)
Source: National Meteorology and Hydrology Service of Peru
