= Calzada de los Molinos =

Coordinates: 42°20′N 4°39′W

- municipality
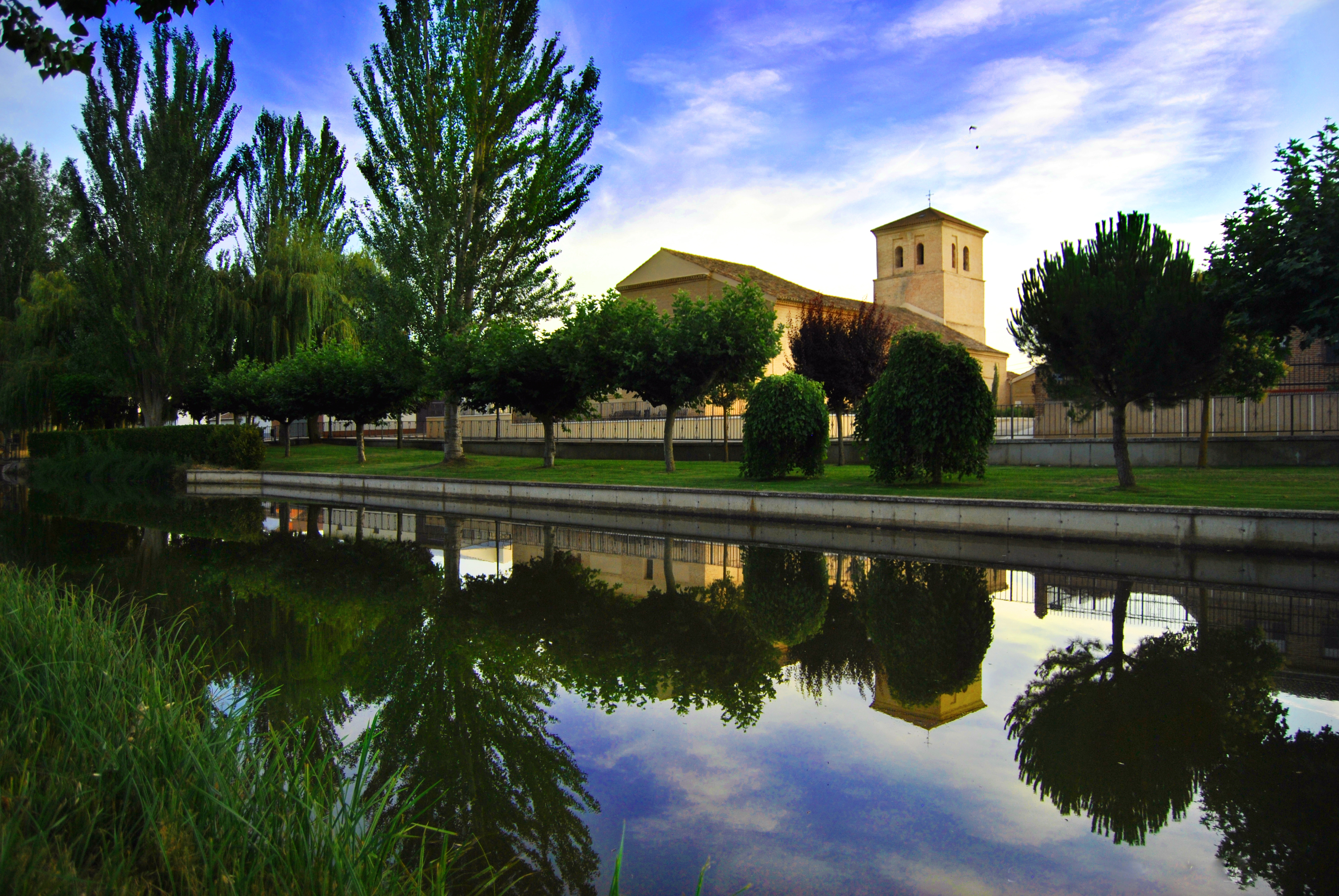

- Flag Coat of arms
- Interactive map of Calzada de los Molinos
- Country: Spain
- Autonomous community: Castile and León
- Province: Palencia
- Municipality: Calzada de los Molinos

Area
  - Total: 25 km^{2} (9.7 sq mi)

Population (2025-01-01)
  - Total: 305
  - Density: 12/km^{2} (32/sq mi)
- Time zone: UTC+1 (CET)
  - Summer (DST): UTC+2 (CEST)
- Website: Official website

Calzada de los Molinos is a municipality located in the province of Palencia, Castile and León, Spain. According to the 2004 census (INE), the municipality has a population of 378 inhabitants.
