= Molino Nuovo =

Coordinates: 46.017767°N 8.957119°E

- Quarter
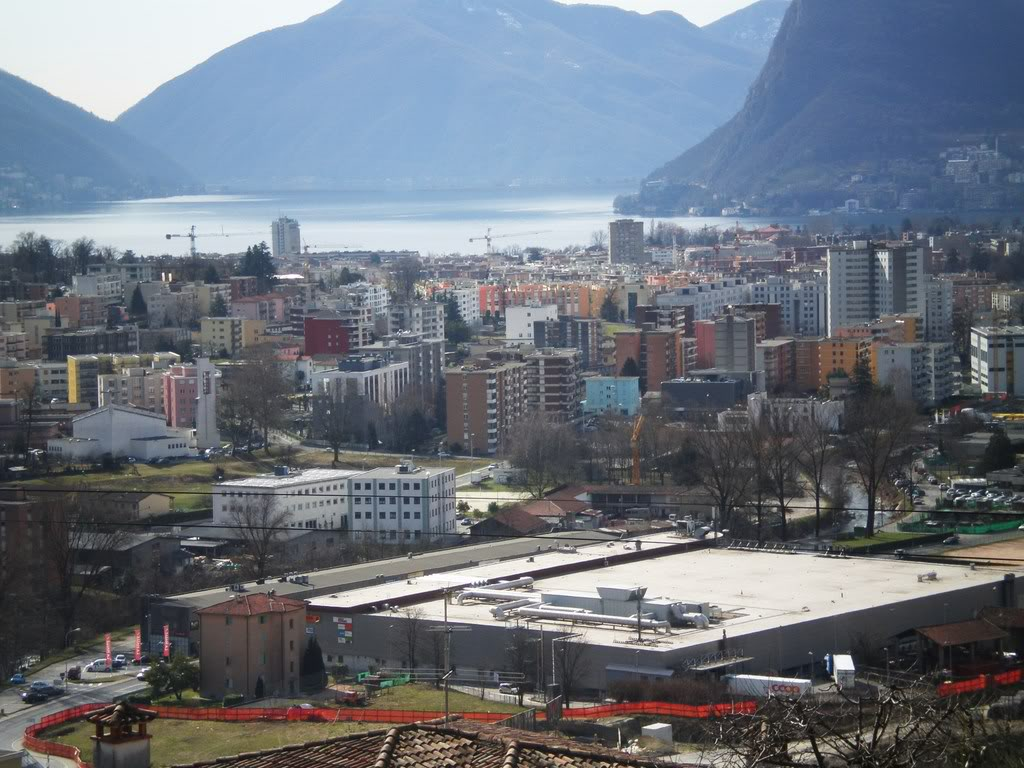
- Country: Switzerland
- Canton: Ticino
- District: Lugano
- City: Lugano

Population (2012-12-31)
  - Total: 9,258

Molino Nuovo is a quarter of the city of Lugano, in the Swiss canton of Ticino. It lies to the north of the city center, and is the most populous quarter of the city. In 2012, it had a population of 9,258.
