= William Chard =

William George Chard (1812 - September 19, 1877) was a California pioneer.

== Life ==
William George Chard was born in Columbia County, New York in 1812. He came to California via New Mexico with trappers Cyrus Alexander and Lemuel Carpenter, arriving in Los Angeles in 1832. He travelled to Santa Barbara, and Monterey. Chard married Maria Esteven Robles (1823–1871) in 1837. In 1844, he was granted the Rancho Las Flores Mexican land grant in present-day Tehama County, California. Chard was Superintendent of the New Almaden quicksilver mine south of San Jose until 1846.

He died September 19, 1877.
