= Ferguson Fire =

2018 wildfire in Central California

- Part of the 2018 California wildfires
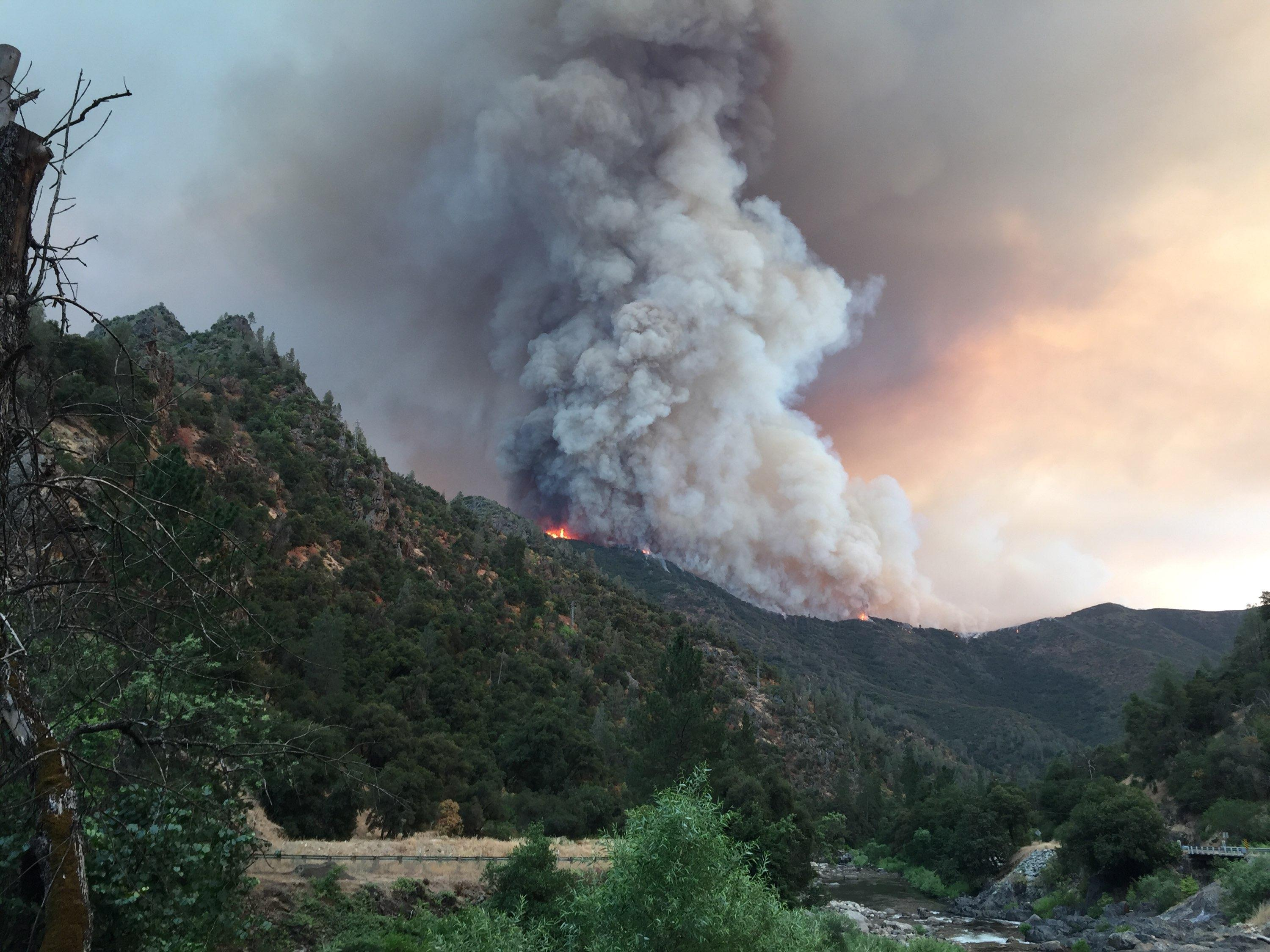
- The Ferguson Fire on July 14, 2018
- Date: July 13, 2018 –; August 19, 2018
- Location: Sierra National Forest, Stanislaus National Forest and Yosemite National Park, California, United States
- Coordinates: 37.652°N 119.881°W

Statistics
- Burned area: 96,901 acres (39,214 ha)
- Land use: National forest

Impacts
- Deaths: 2 firefighters
- Injuries: 19 firefighters
- Structures destroyed: 10
- Cost: $171.2 million (2018 USD)

Ignition
- Cause: Faulty vehicle catalytic converter

Map
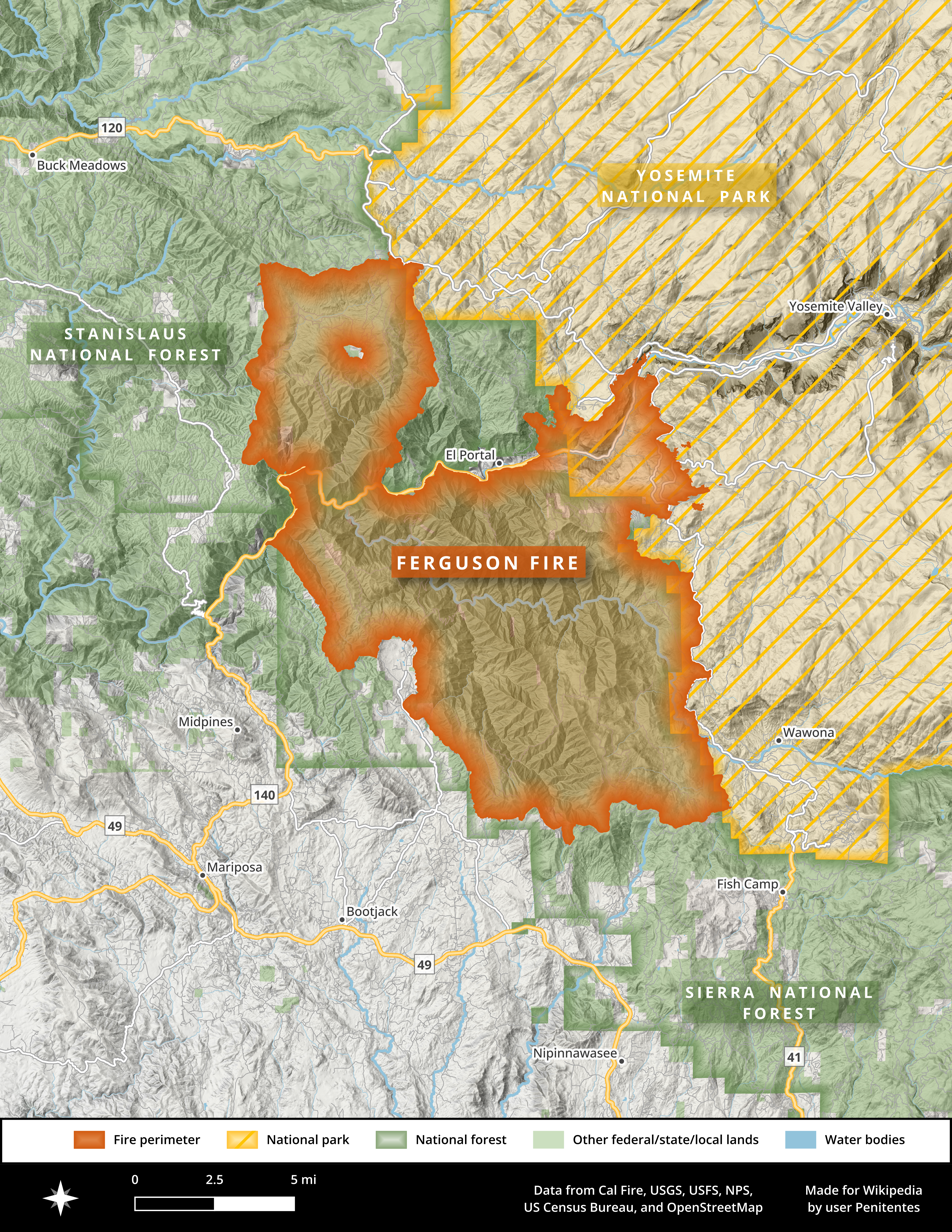
- A map of the footprint of the Ferguson Fire

- Location of the fire in California

Location of Ferguson Fire

The Ferguson Fire was a major wildfire in the Sierra National Forest, Stanislaus National Forest and Yosemite National Park in California in the United States. The fire was reported on July 13, 2018, burning 96,901 acres (39,214 ha), before it was 100% contained on August 19, 2018. Interior areas of the fire continued to smolder and burn until September 19, 2018, when InciWeb declared the fire to be inactive. The Ferguson Fire was caused by the superheated fragments of a faulty vehicle catalytic converter igniting vegetation. The fire, which burned mostly in inaccessible wildland areas of the national forest, impacted recreational activities in the area, including in Yosemite National Park, where Yosemite Valley and Wawona were closed. The Ferguson Fire caused at least $171.2 million (2018 USD) in damages, with a suppression cost of $118.5 million and economic losses measuring $52.7 million. Two firefighters were killed and nineteen others were injured in the fire.

== Progression ==
=== July ===
The Ferguson Fire was first reported on July 13, 2018, around 8:30 p.m. PDT in the Savage Trading Post area, in the Sierra National Forest in California. Investigators determined that the fire started when the superheated fragments of a vehicle's catalytic converter lit vegetation on fire. Burning in an inaccessible area that was extremely steep and hazardous, the fire grew to 4,000 acres (1,619 ha) by the morning of July 15. Crews focused on securing a fire line and protecting structures along Highway 140 and in Hite's Cove and Cedar Lodge. The first evacuations were put in place for communities of Jerseydale, Mariposa Pines and Yosemite West. By the evening, 108 structures were reported threatened, and the fire was two percent contained and had grown 300 acres (121 ha). Two more communities were put on evacuation, as well as additional road closures along Highway 140 and select roads in the forest.

By the morning of July 16, the fire had grown to 9,266 acres (3,750 ha), with most of the fire growth being in the Nutmeg and Devils Gulch areas. New containment lines were put in place near Sweetwater Ridge, which was also placed under mandatory evacuation. Electricity went out in eastern areas impacted by the fire, including portions of Yosemite National Park. A Red Cross shelter was opened at a church in Mariposa for evacuees. By the morning of July 17, the western entrance to Yosemite National Park was closed. Power was restored for a portion of fire impacted areas near the National Park.

Low-level smoke hampered visibility on July 18, grounding aircraft fighting the fire while the fire grew southeasterly. Crews continued to build handlines off the southeast portion of the Merced River to protect Yosemite West and crews completed firelines west of Indian Flat to west of Cedar Lodge. The next day, the fire moved towards Highway 140, Sweetwater Creek, Jerseydale, and Ferguson Ridge. Crews focused on improving indirect lines along Sweetwater Ridge and from Highway 140 southeast to Wawona Road. The fire continued to remain on the south side of the Merced River and mandatory evacuations were put in place for El Portal Trailer Court.

On July 20, the fire jumped the Merced River, creating two spot fires north of the river in the Stanislaus National Forest near Miller Gulch and Ned Gulch. The spot fires burned an estimated total of 600 acres (243 ha). New mandatory evacuations were put in place for Rancheria Government Housing, Old El Portal, Foresta and the Yosemite View Lodge. A new evacuation center was opened at Yosemite Valley Elementary School in Yosemite National Park.

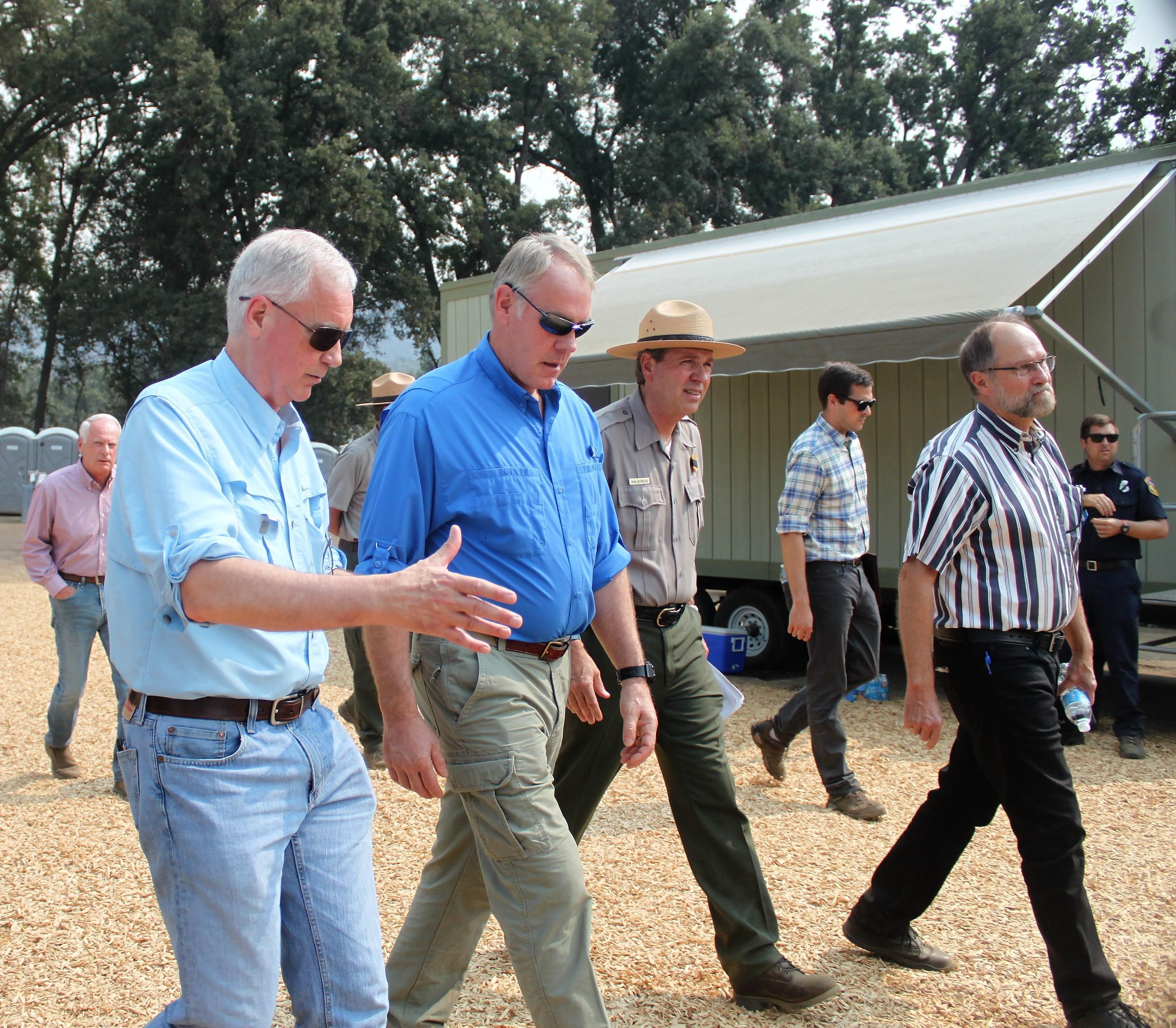
Ryan Zinke visited the Ferguson Fire on July 21, 2018

The fire continued to burn in Ned's Gulch overnight and into July 21. Air and ground crews made concerted efforts only to make minimal impact on the fire's growth, which was estimated at 2,000 acres (809 ha) in this specific area. In the afternoon on July 21, U.S. Secretary of the Interior Ryan Zinke visited the fire. Fire restrictions were put in place in the Sierra National Forest. The community of Yosemite West was put back under mandatory evacuation and Anderson Valley was added to the mandatory evacuation list.

By the evening of July 21, the inversion layer had lifted and the Ferguson Fire had grown over 1,900 acres (769 ha), mainly in the fire's northern region, north of Highway 140 near Ned's Gulch. The rugged terrain remained a challenge for fire crews both on foot and in the air, and little progress to contain the fire was made. Two more firefighters suffered back injuries and were hospitalized. Overnight, the fire continued to grow and containment progress was made in the Jerseydale area. Crews were called away from fighting a portion of the fire in the Stanislaus National Forest due to safety hazards. The fire continued to grow by the end of the day on July 22 and Old Yosemite Road was placed under mandatory evacuation and closed.

The next morning, the fire was 33,743 acres (13,655 ha) and was reported a thirteen percent contained with one structure being destroyed. Crews used hand and heavy equipment to build lines in Montgomery Gulch and areas of Eagle Peak and Buena Vista in the north, while the fire continued to burn in the Chowchilla Mountains in the south. Crews had success at protecting Jerseydale and mopping up began in that area. The fire was reported as being an estimated two miles from Yosemite National Park's boundary.

On July 24, portions of Yosemite National Park were declared to close by noon on July 25, specifically Yosemite Valley and Wawona. Park visitors and residents in the closed areas are being asked to leave and evacuated. Mariposa Grove has been closed. In the evening, evacuation orders for Mariposa Pines were lifted. Firefighters had a productive day, with indirect containment lines being completed up Soapstone Ridge in the Stanislaus National Forest. Containment lines were also finalized from Jerseydale to Wawona Campground.

Lushmeadows Estate was put under mandatory evacuation on July 25. Additional road closures were put in place in Wawona and Yosemite Falls. Warm and dry weather during the afternoon caused the fire to grow 3,054 acres (1,236 ha). Small gusts of wind in the early morning caused small spot fires.

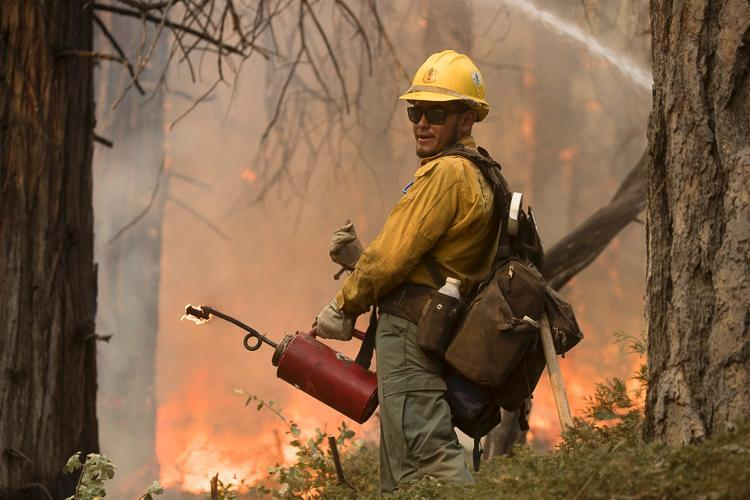
This Spring Valley Hotshot was one of many firefighters brought in to fight the Ferguson Fire

In the early evening, evacuations were lifted for Jerseydale and Sweetwater Ridge Road. Overnight, crews had worked to strengthen containment lines, especially near Magoon Creek, where crews focused on isolating the spread of a fire that had gone over the containment line. A containment line was finished from Five Corners to Pilot Peak on the northside of the fire, as well as another finished around Wanona and the lines around El Porto were expanded. In the evening, on July 26, additional vegetation was burned from containment lines to further protect El Portal and Yosemite West. A three-acre spot fire crossed the containment line near Jerseysdale and was quickly suppressed.

On Friday, July 27, Yosemite National Park announced that Yosemite Valley would reopen on August 3, with Wawona Road and Mariposa Grove of Giant Sequoias remaining closed. That evening, almost 4,000 personnel continued to fight the fire, with containment growing to 29 percent due to favorable conditions. Hot spots were extinguished on the west side of the fire and on the east side, crews completed firing operations from Henness Ridge to the Merced River. Aircraft burned pockets of vegetation between containment lines and the fire's perimeter. Additionally, crews strengthened and linked containment lines between burn scars from the 2017 Empire Fire and South Fork Fire. On the south side, additional containment line strengthening took place. That night, evacuation orders for the Lushmeadows subdivision were lifted. A small fire, the result of swirling winds, jumped the containment line about two miles southwest of El Portal along the fire's northeast perimeter. Overnight, fire crews focused on strengthening and extending containment lines. Crews worked the area from Henness Ridge southeast to Highway 41 to prepare it for a new containment line. On the northern area of the fire, crews strengthened the containment line to reduce fuel availability.

On July 29, a second firefighter was killed when he was struck by a tree. The repopulation of Monte Vista and Vista Lago began when evacuation orders were lifted in the afternoon. Crews focused on mopping up hot spots and containing a small fire that started over the containment line near Eagle Peak. Overnight, crews put out two spot fires around Roundtree Saddle and began tactical firing towards Chowchilla Mountain and Wawona Campground. Crews continued efforts to protect giant sequoias in the fire area and also focused on securing the southeast quadrant of the fire to stop it from spreading into Yosemite National Park. Specialists began evaluating the western side of the fire for repair and mitigation as a result of suppression efforts. Evacuation orders were lifted for the East Westfall Road area and the Highway 140 and Ponderosa Basin. Overnight, the fire's perimeter grew to within one mile of Wawona Campground. Containment lines around the southwest corner of Yosemite National Park total six miles. Crews continue to focus on containing a portion of the fire that went over the containment line near El Portal. The fire is in an area with excessive amounts of beetle-killed trees and is very hard to access. Fire retardant and water drops were used in the meantime while ground crews explore other options for containment. Smoke visibility increased due to tactical firing.

On the morning of July 31, Yosemite National Park stated that they would reopen the Yosemite Valley, Wawona Campground and sequoia groves on Sunday, August 5. Indirect fire lines were used to intercept the spot fire near El Portal and fire crews were sent to Foresta in case the fire moved northeastern. Air quality declined in the area due to firing operations. Evacuation orders were lifted for the Ponderosa Basin Area and East Westfall Road. By the evening of July 31, the fire had burned 58,074 acres (23,502 ha) and was 33 percent contained.

=== August ===
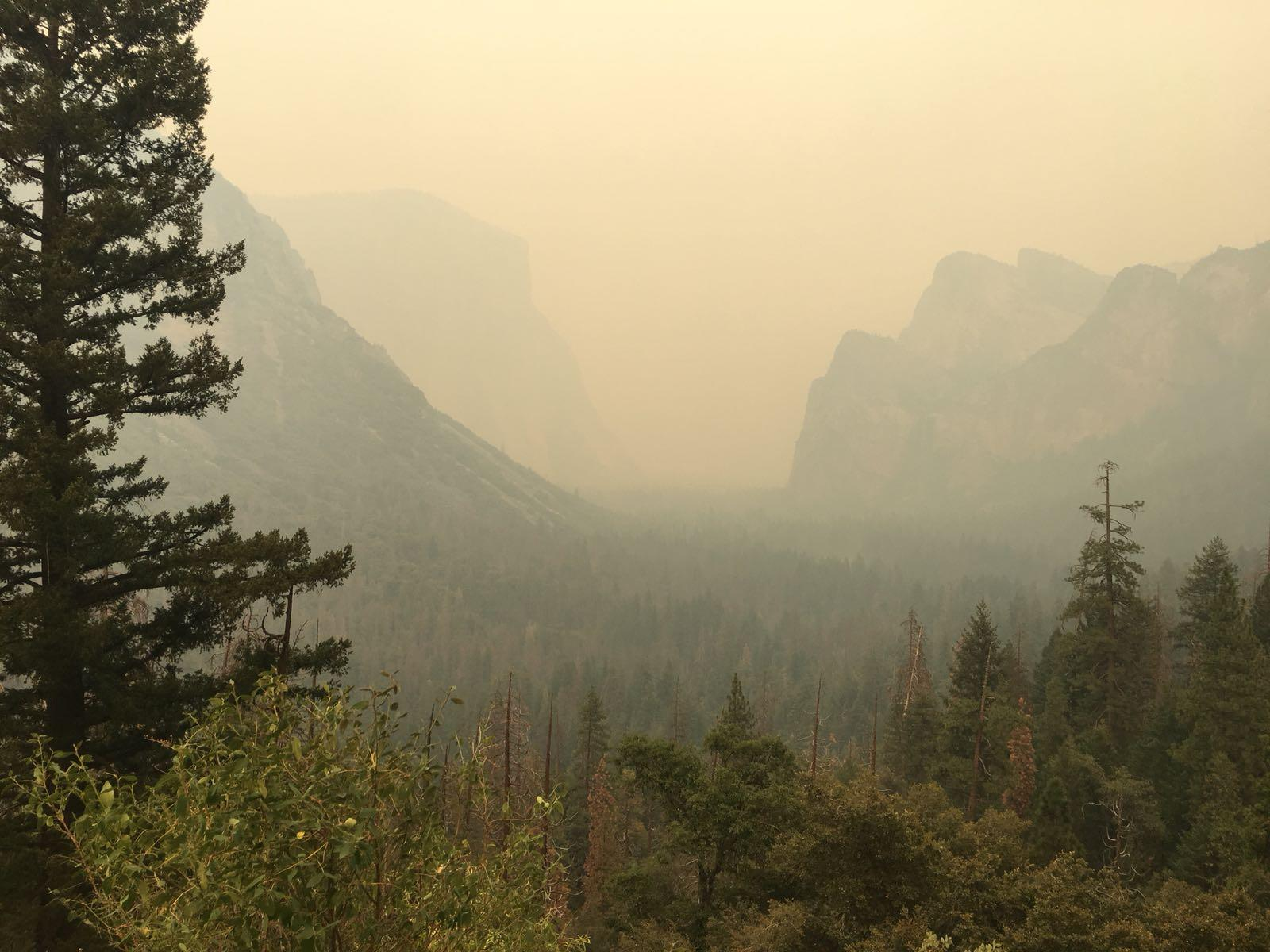
Half Dome and Yosemite Valley in heavy smoke, August 5

As the Ferguson Fire continued to burn into August, it had grown 4,809 acres (1,946 ha) overnight into August 1 totaling 62,883 acres (25,448 ha) at 39 percent containment. Tactical firing was focused around Highway 41 toward Wawona Campground, heading west from Crow Peak. Crews also focused on building containment lines around Merced Grove and the giant sequoias. The fire continued to spread southeast from El Portal, threatening Yosemite West. The fire was successfully slowed. Select roads and trails in Groveland Ranger District in Stanislaus National Forest were closed due to the fire's impacts. Two more firefighters were injured, totaling 11 in the Ferguson Fire. Wawona was evacuated out of concern of the fire expanding further into the area. Evacuation orders were lifted for El Portal Trailer Court.

Overnight, spot fires were contained near Wawona as the fire grew 5,727 acres (2,318 ha). Another spot fire appeared on the north end of the fire, which resulted in the closure of Highway 120 (Big Oak Flat Road) due to smoke and fire crew congestion. This made the only entrance into Yosemite National Park Crane Flat to Lee Vining (Highway 120). By the evening of August 6, the fire burned 94,331 acres (38,174 ha) and was 39 percent contained.

On August 19, the fire was declared to be 100% contained, after having grown to 96,901 acres (39,214 ha). Interior areas continued to ignite during the heat of the day, but did not pose a threat to the containment lines.

=== September ===
Throughout the first half of September, hotspots continued to smolder within the Ferguson Fire's perimeter. On September 19, 2018, InciWeb declared the Ferguson Fire to be inactive, after a lack of fire activity was detected within the containment lines.

== Effects ==
The Ferguson Fire affected areas of tourism and recreation in the Sierra National Forest and Yosemite National Park, specifically Yosemite Valley, Wawona and the giant sequoia groves of Mariposa and Merced. Additionally, residential areas were affected throughout the region.

=== Evacuations ===
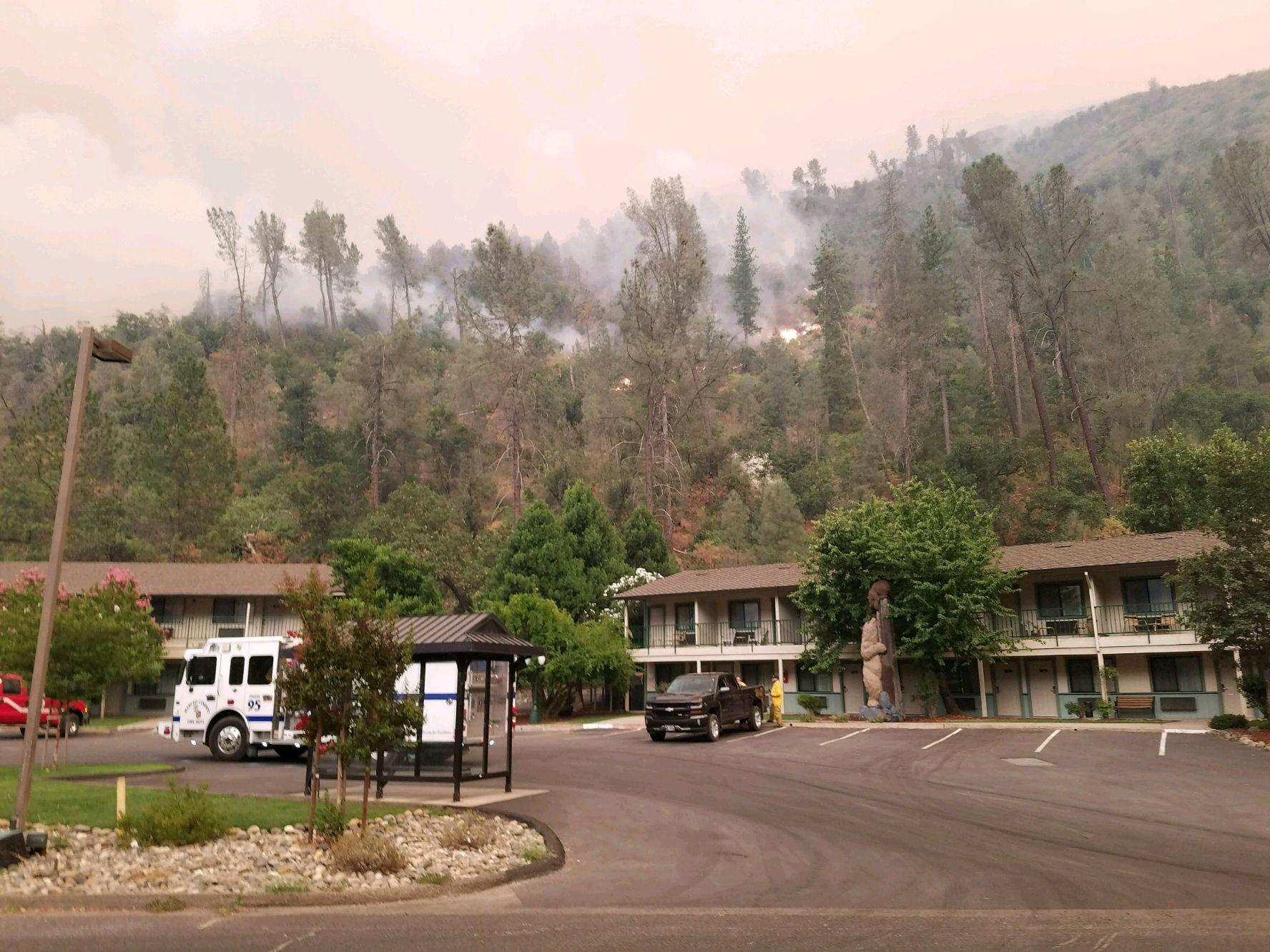
Cedar Lodge was evacuated due to the Ferguson Fire

The Red Cross at Mariposa Elementary School served as an evacuation center.

As of August 1, the following areas were under evacuation orders:

- Anderson Valley
- River Road from Briceburg to last BLM Campground
- Foresta
- Old El Portal
- Old Yosemite Road
- Wawona
- Yosemite View Lodge
- Yosemite West

As of August 14, all evacuation orders had been lifted and the areas reopened.

=== Closures ===
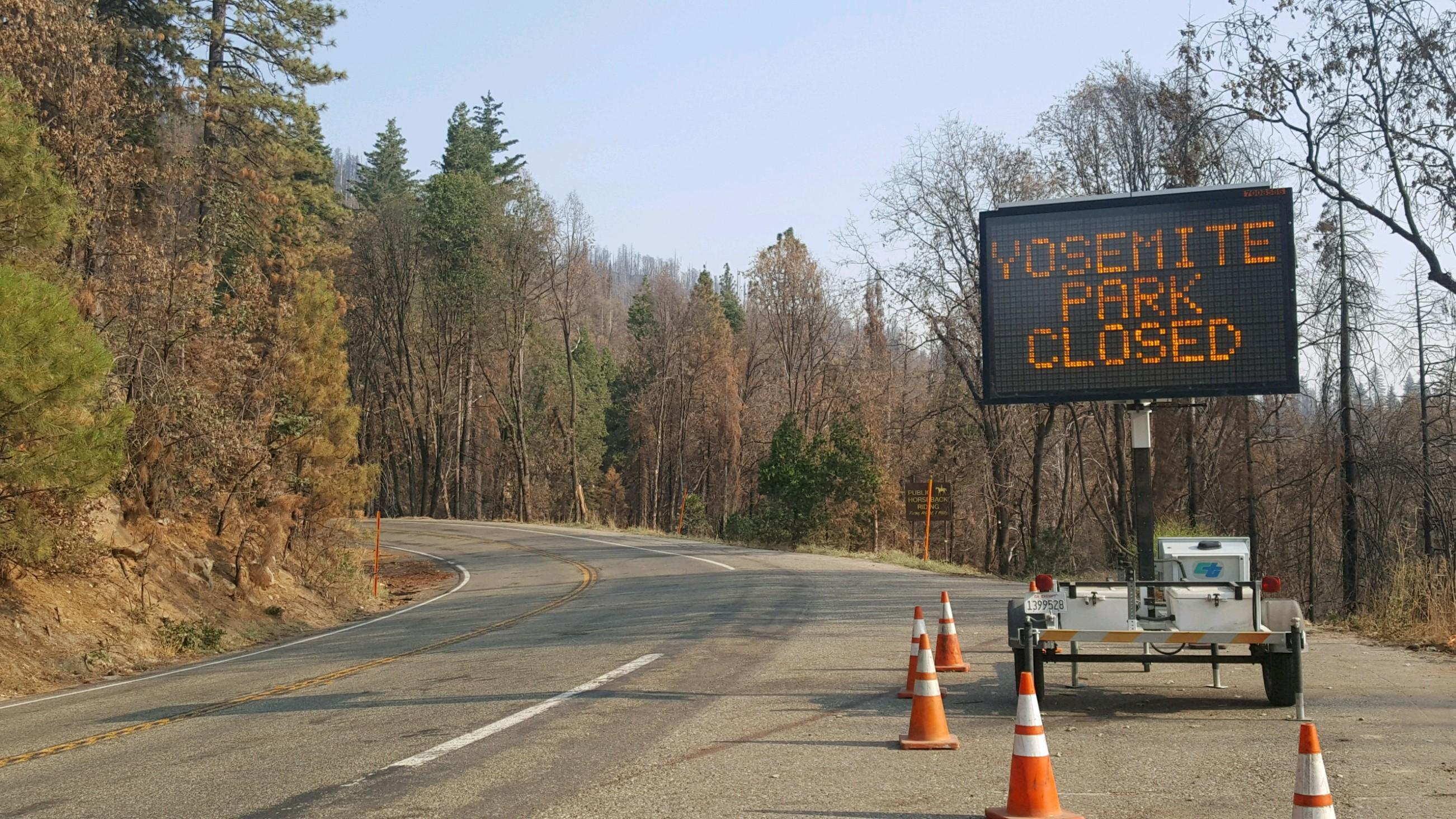
Access to Yosemite National Park was halted due to the fire.

As of August 1, the following roads were closed:

- Anderson Valley Road
- Foresta Road
- River Road from Briceburg to the gate at Railroad Flat and all campground areas along SR 140
- Summit Road
- Old Yosemite Road
- Wawona Road (SR 41) between Chilnualna Falls in Wawona and Bridalveil Road in Yosemite Valley

Additional closures included:

- Yosemite National Park's Yosemite Valley and Wawona
- Mariposa Grove

As of August 19, the roads had been reopened, with the exception of Wawona Road, scheduled to reopen on August 24.

=== Recreation ===
The Ferguson Fire seriously affected the recreational areas of the Sierra National Forest, Stanislaus National Forest and Yosemite National Forest.

Yosemite Valley was closed on July 25 due to smoke effects and to allow for firefighting operations on El Portal Road and Wawona Road. Additional closures included Glacier Point Road, Bridalveil Creek Campground, Wawona Campground and the Merced Grove of Giant Sequoias. In August, specific trails and roads in the Groveland Ranger District of Stanislaus National Forest were closed due to anticipated long-term fire effects.

=== Historic structures ===
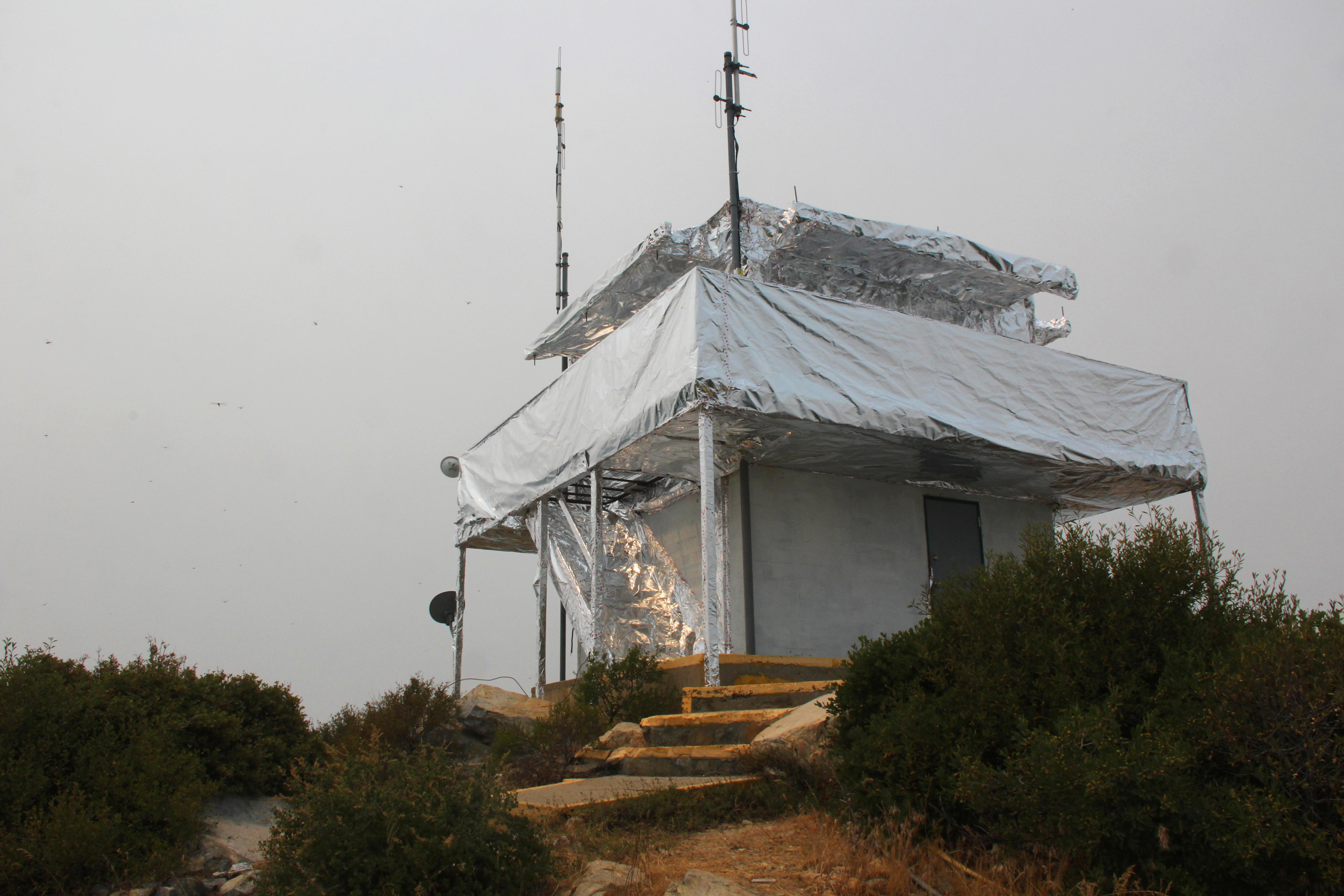
Signal Peak Lookout wrapped for structure protection during the Ferguson Fire

The Ferguson Fire threatened three fire lookout towers:, namely Henness Ridge, Signal Peak, and Trumbull Peak Lookout. All three are on the National Historic Lookout Register.

== Fatalities ==
A bulldozer operator from the California Department of Forestry and Fire Protection, Braden Varney, died when his vehicle rolled down a ravine. A second firefighter, Brian Hughes, died on July 29. Hughes, captain of the Arrowhead Interagency Hotshots, was killed when he was struck by a tree.

== Fire growth and containment progress ==
Fire containment status Gray: contained; Red: active; %: percent contained;
Date	Area burned acres (hectares)	Containment
Jul 15	4,310 (1,744)	
Jul 16	9,266 (3,750)	
Jul 17	13,082 (5,294)	
Jul 18	17,319 (7,009)	
Jul 19	21,541 (8,717)	
Jul 20	24,450 (9,895)	
Jul 21	29,045 (11,754)	
Jul 22	32,484 (13,146)	
Jul 23	36,102 (14,610)	
Jul 24	37,795 (15,295)	
Jul 25	41,576 (16,825)	
Jul 26	44,223 (17,896)	
Jul 27	46,675 (18,889)	
Jul 28	51,671 (20,911)	
Jul 29	53,646 (21,710)	
Jul 30	56,659 (22,929)	
Jul 31	57,856 (23,413)	
Aug 1	63,798 (25,818)	
Aug 2	68,601 (27,762)	
Aug 3	77,207 (31,245)	
Aug 5	89,633 (36,273)	
Aug 6	94,331 (38,174)	
Aug 8	94,992 (38,442)	
Aug 9	95,104 (38,487)	
Aug 10	95,544 (387)	
Aug 12	95,947 (388)	
Aug 13	96,457 (390)	
Aug 15	96,810 (392)	
Aug 19	96,901 (392)	

== See also ==
- 2018 California wildfires
