= Lane Fire =

2018 wildfire in Northern California

- Part of the 2018 California wildfires
- Date: June 23, 2018 –; July 4, 2018
- Location: Paynes Creek, California, United States
- Coordinates: 40.35068°N 121.77867°W

Statistics
- Burned area: 3,716 acres (15 km^{2})

Impacts
- Injuries: 1

Ignition
- Cause: Unknown

Map
- Location of fire in California.

The Lane Fire was a wildfire in Paynes Creek, California in the United States. The fire started on June 23, 2018, and burned a total of 3,716 acres (15 km^{2}), before it was contained on July 4. During its height, the fire threatened 200 structures.

== Progression ==
The Lane Fire was reported around 11:35 A.M. PDT on June 23, 2018, just off Highway 36 in Paynes Creek, California. By the next day, the fire had burned a total of 3,000 acres (12 km^{2}). Power was intentionally shut off by Pacific Gas & Electric. The evacuation center at Mineral Elementary School was moved to Red Bluff Community Center due to expanded evacuations, which in the evening totaled 200 individuals.

All evacuation orders were lifted on July 1. On July 2, the fire had burned 3,716 acres (15 km^{2}). Only July 4, the Lane Fire was fully contained, with no further increases in size.
