= Georges Fire =

2018 wildfire in Eastern California

- Part of the 2018 California wildfires
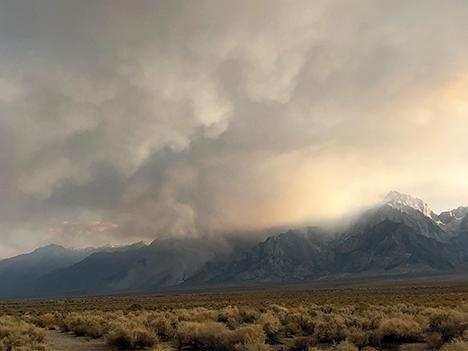
- The Georges Fire on July 8, 2018
- Date: July 8, 2018 –; July 18, 2018
- Location: Inyo County California, United States
- Coordinates: 36.646°N 118.221°W

Statistics
- Burned area: 2,883 acres (12 km^{2})

Impacts
- Deaths: None
- Injuries: None
- Structures destroyed: None

Ignition
- Cause: Lightning

Map
- Location of fire in California.

Location of Georges Fire

The Georges Fire was a wildfire in Inyo County, California in the United States. The fire was reported on July 8, 2018 in a rural area north of Lone Pine and west of Manzanar. The fire was started by a lightning strike and impacted recreational activities in the Inyo National Forest, as well as the habitat for Sierra Nevada bighorn sheep, an endangered species. The fire burned 2,883 acres (12 km^{2}), before burning out on July 18.

== Progression ==
The Georges Fire was reported on the afternoon of July 8, in a rural area north of Lone Pine and west of Manzanar. The fire was started by a lightning strike. The fire started near Georges Creek, which was named after a Paiute chief. By the evening, the fire had burned 750 acres (3 km^{2}). Roads accessing the area were closed, with nine crews and a DC-10 Air Tanker being assigned to the fire.

By the next day, July 9, the fire had grown 2,000 acres (8 km^{2}) thanks to high winds. Two additional roads were closed and campers and residents in Whitney Portal were put on evacuation warnings. Inyo National Forest closed the Whitney Portal and Shepherd Pass Trailheads. That afternoon, Whitney Portal was evacuated. That same evening, the fire was declared 10 percent contained, however, the fire continued to grow in the south and west and fire suppression efforts were focused on the south due to the fire's threats to Whitney Portal. The fire's growth on the western end was limited due to a rock face the fire would hit, quieting the fire due to lack of fuels.

On July 10, the National Recreation Trail was closed from Lone Pine Campground. That evening, thunderstorms provided precipitation to the fire, however the moisture was quickly dried up by warm weather and high winds. On July 11, evacuation orders were lifted for Whitney Portal and Whitney Portal Road, Mt. Whitney Trailhead and Shepherd Pass Trailhead were reopened. As of July 13, favorable weather improved fire conditions, including monsoonal moisture, decreasing the fire's growth and easing the ability of crew's to control it.

On July 18, the Georges Fire became inactive, with no new smoke or fire activity reported, with the burn area remaining at 2,883 acres (12 km^{2}).

== Effects ==
The fire primarily impacted areas in the Inyo National Forest, specifically hiking and campgrounds, including the closure of a portion of the National Recreation Trail. The community of Whitney Portal was evacuated and the main road accessing the community was closed during the fire's height. Two additional trails and roads were closed during the fire.

The Georges Fire burned wintering habitats used by the endangered Sierra Nevada bighorn sheep. The fire has helped clear pinyon and juniper canopy cover. This benefits the sheep, who are preyed upon by mountain lions and other predators who reside in the woodlands.
