= Milton, California =

Unincorporated community in California, United States

Milton
- Unincorporated community
- Location in California Milton (the United States)
- Coordinates: 38°01′55″N 120°51′08″W
- Country: United States
- State: California
- County: Calaveras
- Elevation: 390 ft (120 m)

California Historical Landmark
- Reference no.: 262

Milton is an unincorporated community in Calaveras County, California, United States. It lies at an elevation of 394 feet (120 m) and is located at 38°01′55″N 120°51′08″W. The community is served by ZIP code 95684 and area code 209.

Milton was established in 1871 when the Stockton and Copperopolis Railroad, later a Southern Pacific Railroad branch, was completed. The town was named for railroad engineer Milton Latham. As the terminus of the railroad, Milton was a staging point for travelers completing their journeys by wagon or stagecoach.

The town today is registered as California Historical Landmark #262.

A post office was established in 1871 and closed in 1942.

== Politics ==
In the state legislature, Milton is in the 8th senatorial district, represented by Democrat Angelique Ashby, and the 5th Assembly district, represented by Republican Joe Patterson. Federally, Milton is in California's 4th congressional district, represented by Democrat Mike Thompson.

== See also ==
- Waverly Fire
