= Natchez Fire =

2018 wildfire in Northern California

- Part of the 2018 California wildfires
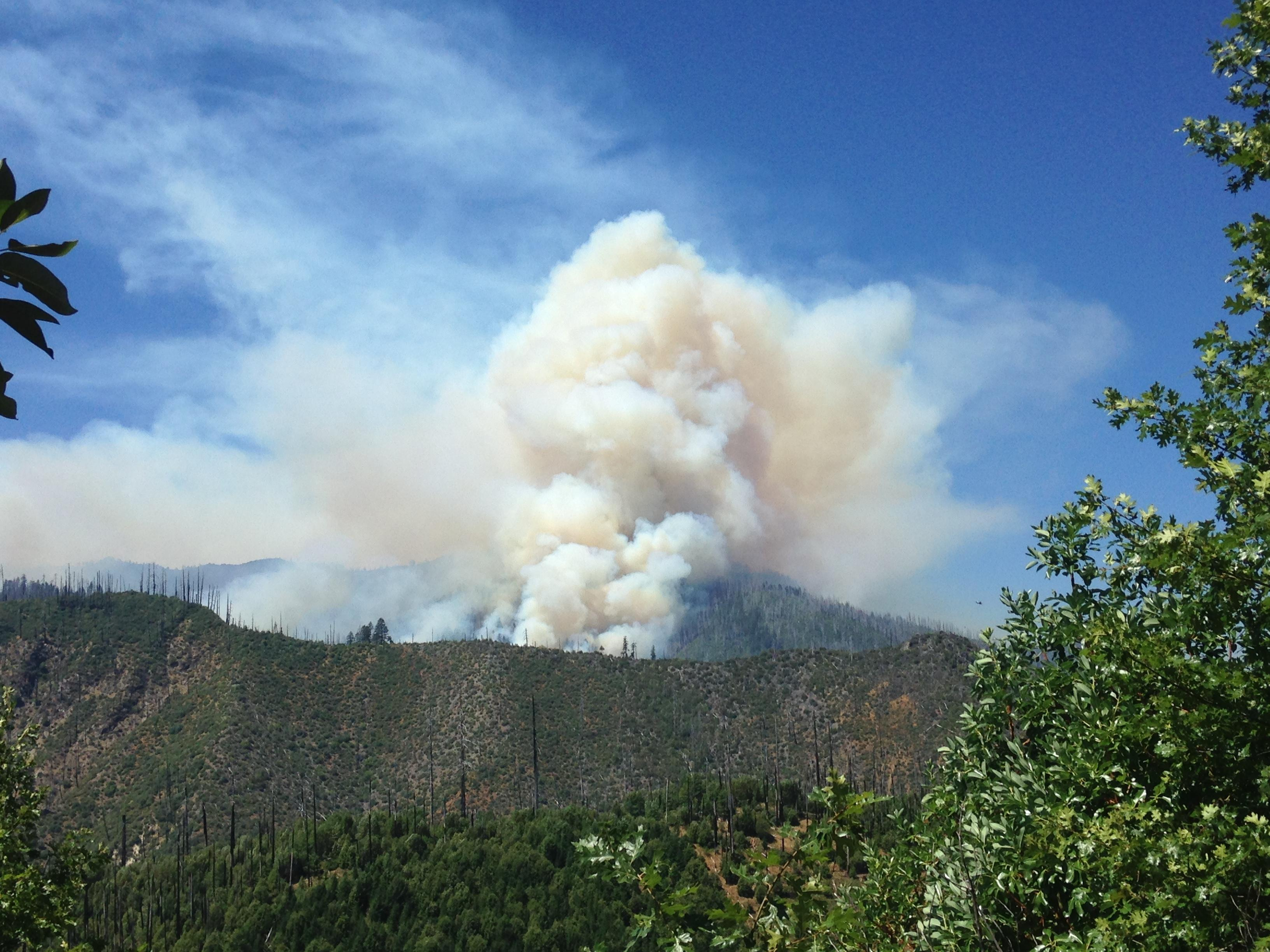
- Natchez Fire on July 20, 2018
- Date: July 15, 2018 –; October 30, 2018
- Location: Siskiyou County, California, United States, near the California–Oregon Border
- Coordinates: 41.956°N 123.551°W

Statistics
- Burned area: 38,134 acres (154 km^{2})

Impacts
- Deaths: None reported
- Injuries: None reported
- Cost: Unknown

Ignition
- Cause: Lightning

Map
- Location of fire in California

The Natchez Fire was a wildfire that burned near the California and Oregon border in Siskiyou County, California, in the United States. The Natchez Fire began on July 15, 2018, due to lightning, and the fire burned a total of 38,134 acres (154 km^{2}; 60 sq mi) before it was fully contained on October 30, 2018.

== Progression ==
The Natchez Fire ignited 8 miles north of Happy Camp on July 15, 2018, around 6:30 P.M. PDT, due to lightning. During the next couple of weeks, the Natchez Fire gradually expanded in size, reaching 6,174 acres (24.99 km^{2}) by July 31, with 15% containment.

The fire continued to burn into the month of August, while continuing to grow. On August 11, 2018, the fire had burned a total of 12,449 acres (50.38 km^{2}) and was 52% contained. By August 14, 2018, the fire had burned a total of 15,940 acres (64.5 km^{2}) and was 55% contained. The fire continued to grow in size during the next couple of weeks. On August 31, the Natchez Fire had burned 27,076 acres (109.57 km^{2}) and was 70% contained.

During the first week of September, the Natchez Fire quickly expanded in size, due to a heat wave and dry conditions, reaching 31,979 acres (129.41 km^{2}) by September 8, while containment increased only slightly to 74%. Afterward, the Natchez Fire grew at a much slower pace, while firefighters continued making progress on containing the fire. By September 19, the Natchez Fire had reached 33,340 acres (134.9 km^{2}), while containment increased to 84%. On September 25, the Natchez Fire grew to 35,037 acres (141.79 km^{2}), while containment dropped to 82%. On September 28, the Natchez Fire had expanded to 37,193 acres (150.51 km^{2}), while containment increased to 84%. By October 2, the Natchez Fire had grown to 38,134 acres (154.32 km^{2}), while containment remained at 84%. Afterward, the Natchez Fire stopped growing in size while firefighters gradually increased the containment of the wildfire, with containment reaching 89% by October 7. On October 30, 2018, the Natchez Fire was finally 100% contained.

== See also ==
- 2018 California wildfires
- 2018 Oregon wildfires
