= 2018 California wildfires =

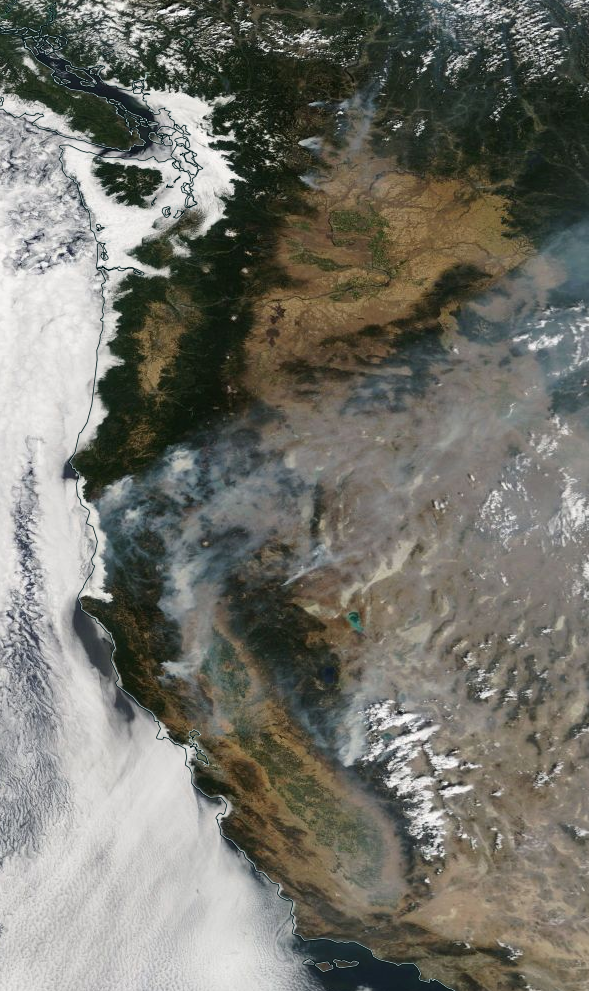
1	Garner Complex
2	Natchez Fire
3	Carr Fire
4	Mendocino Complex Fire
5	Ferguson Fire
An August 1, 2018, satellite image of the wildfires burning in Northern California and Southern Oregon; smoke can be seen trailing northeastward over Nevada, Oregon, Washington, and Idaho

Statistics
- Total fires: 8,527
- Total area: 1,975,086 acres (799,289 ha)

Impacts
- Deaths: 97 civilians and 6 firefighters
- Injuries: At least 80
- Structures destroyed: 24,226
- Cost: >$26.347 billion (2018 USD)

Map
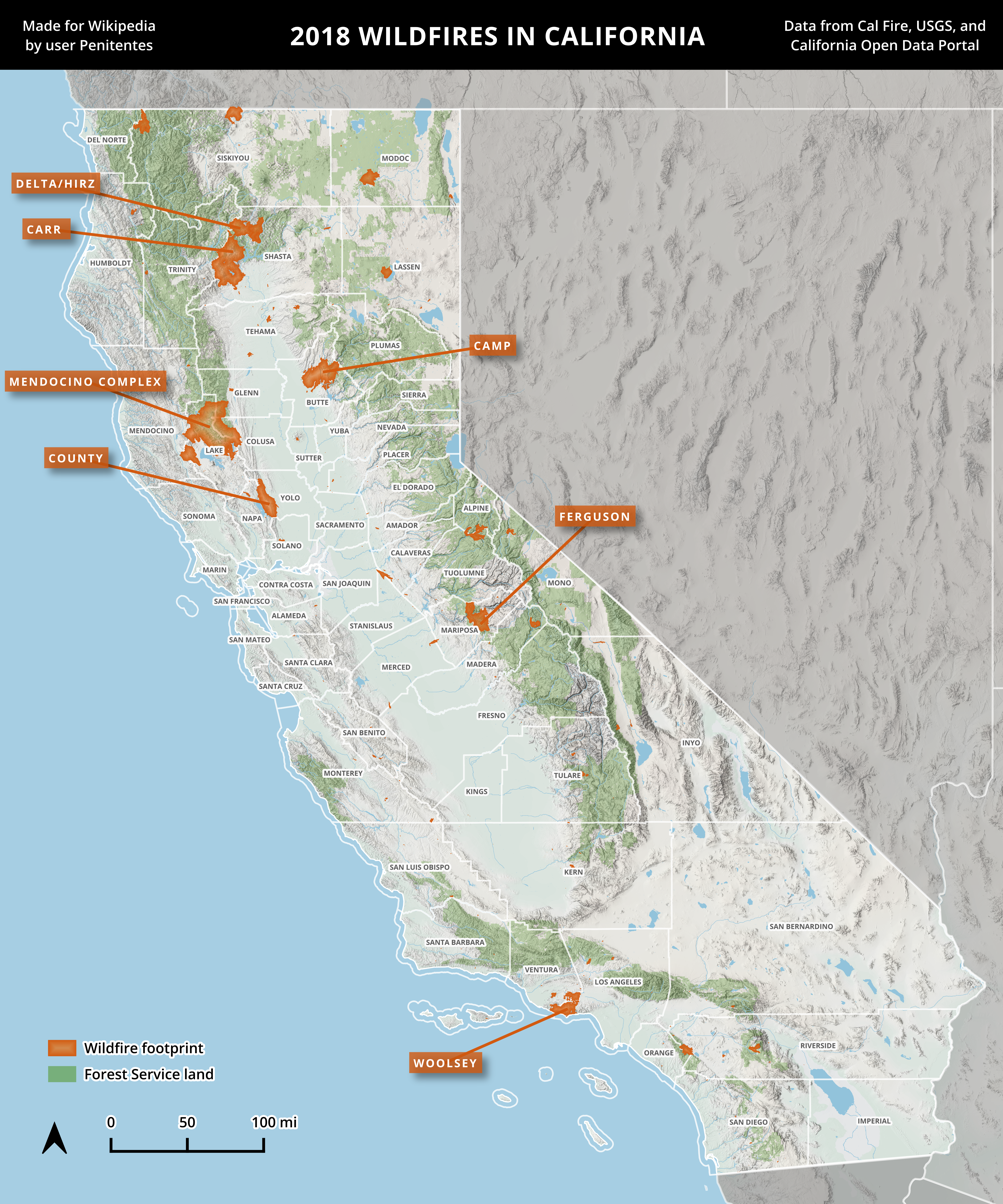
- A map of wildfires in California in 2018, using Cal Fire data

The 2018 wildfire season was the deadliest and most destructive wildfire season in the world. It was also the largest on record at the time, now third after the 2020 and 2021 California wildfire seasons. In 2018, there were a total of 103 confirmed fatalities, 24,226 structures damaged or destroyed, and 8,527 fires burning 1,975,086 acres (799,289 ha), about 2% of the state's 100 million acres of land. Through the end of August 2018, Cal Fire alone spent $432 million on operations. The catastrophic Camp Fire alone killed at least 85 people, destroyed 18,804 buildings and caused $16.5 billion in property damage, while overall the fires resulted in at least $26.347 billion in property damage and firefighting costs, including $25.4 billion in property damage and $947 million in fire suppression costs.

In mid-July to August 2018, a series of large wildfires erupted across California, mostly in the northern part of the state. On August 4, 2018, a national disaster was declared in Northern California, due to the extensive wildfires burning there.

The Carr Fire in July and August 2018 caused more than $1.5 billion (2018 USD) in property damage. The Mendocino Complex Fire burned more than 459,000 acres (186,000 ha), becoming the largest complex fire in the state's history at the time, with the complex's Ranch Fire surpassing the Thomas Fire and the Santiago Canyon Fire of 1889 to become California's single-largest recorded wildfire. In September 2020, the August Complex surpassed the Mendocino Complex to become California's single-largest recorded wildfire.

In November 2018, strong winds aggravated conditions in another round of large, destructive fires that occurred across the state. This new batch of wildfires included the Woolsey Fire and the Camp Fire. The Camp Fire destroyed the town of Paradise and killed at least 85 people, with 1 still unaccounted for as of August 2, 2019. The Camp Fire destroyed more than 18,000 structures, becoming both California's deadliest and most destructive wildfire on record. AccuWeather estimated the total economic cost of the 2018 wildfires at $400 billion (2018 USD), which includes property damage, firefighting costs, direct and indirect economic losses, as well as recovery expenditures. Another study, published two years after the fires, estimated the total damages at $148.5 billion, including capital losses, health costs and indirect losses.

== Background ==
The timing of "fire season" in California is variable, depending on the amount of prior winter and spring precipitation, the frequency and severity of weather such as heat waves and wind events, and moisture content in vegetation. Northern California typically sees wildfire activity between late spring and early fall, peaking in the summer with hotter and drier conditions. Occasional cold frontal passages can bring wind and lightning. The timing of fire season in Southern California is similar, peaking between late spring and fall. The severity and duration of peak activity in either part of the state is modulated in part by weather events: downslope/offshore wind events can lead to critical fire weather, while onshore flow and Pacific weather systems can bring conditions that hamper wildfire growth.

== Causes ==
Several factors led to the destructiveness of the 2018 California wildfire season. A combination of increased fuel loading and atmospheric conditions influenced by global warming led to a series of destructive fires. Primary causes of wildfire vary geographically based on many factors, such as topography. For example, characteristically dense forests in the Sierra Nevada Mountains harbor fuel-driven fires while the open central valley from the south Bay Area to San Diego County are more prone to wind-driven fire over dry grasslands.

=== Increase in fuel ===
A direct contributor to the 2018 California wildfires was an increase in dead tree fuel. By December 2017, there were a record 129 million dead trees in California. Tree mortality is linked to a period during the 2010s of "anomalously warm droughts" that were severe and long-lasting enough to stand out even amongst California's existing history of wildfires and exceptionally dry conditions. One study focused on the concentrated mortality of densely populated conifers of the Sierra Nevada "found that die-off was closely tied to multi-year deep-rooting-zone drying" and that severity of that dryness can be used to predict mortality. Such drought leaves trees stressed for water, which makes them susceptible to beetle infestation and exacerbates tree mortality further.

Drought intensity lessened in California by 2017, but the effects of tree mortality linger for years. One study expresses a lack of sufficient data to confidently determine the rate of coniferous tree decay in the Sierra Nevada. Nonetheless, it is a gradual process, and the remaining dead tree matter is an optimal fuel source for future wild fires.

=== Atmospheric conditions ===
Stanford Earth System Science Professor Noah Diffenbaugh stated that atmospheric conditions for California wildfires are expected to worsen in the future because of the effects of climate change in California and that "what we're seeing over the last few years in terms of the wildfire season in California [is] very consistent with the historical trends in terms of increasing temperatures, increasing dryness, and increasing wildfire risk." Other experts agreed, saying that global warming is to blame for these extreme weather conditions. Global warming has led to higher temperatures and longer summers, creating a drier landscape that gave fires more fuel to burn longer and stronger. Research published August 2018 predicted an increase in the number of wildfires in California as a consequence of climate change. However, from a historical perspective, it has been estimated that prior to 1850, about 4.5 million acres (17,000 km^{2}) burned yearly, in fires that lasted for months.

=== Residential construction in the wildland–urban interface ===
The wildland–urban interface (or WUI) refers to the zone of transition between unoccupied land and human development. Communities that are within 0.5 miles (0.80 km) of the zone may also be included. These lands and communities adjacent to and surrounded by wildlands are at risk of wildfires. Since the 1990s, over 43% of new residential buildings have been constructed in this area. In some areas, the amount of new residences in those areas is 80%. In the past, when these areas burned, no residences were lost, but now residences are present, which end up being destroyed. Furthermore, a "century of successful fire suppression" performed in an attempt to protect forests and those living in the WUI has also disrupted natural cycles of disturbance and renewed succession of an ecosystem by allowing fuel to reach abnormal density levels discussed above.

== Air quality ==
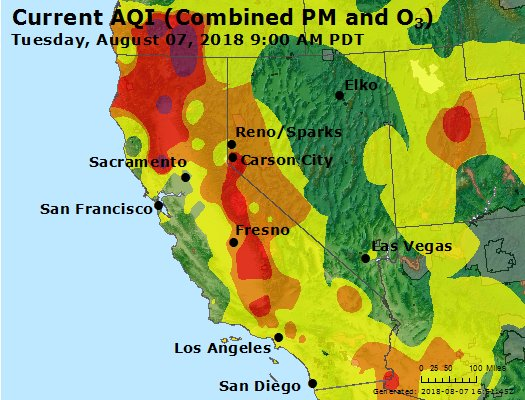
Air quality of California on August 7, 2018

Northern California and the Central Valley saw drastic increases in air pollutants during the height of the July and August fires, while Southern California also experienced an increase in air pollution in August. Air quality in Northern and Central California remained poor until mid-September 2018, when fire activity was drastically diminished. However, during the November Camp Fire, air quality diminished again, with the majority of the Bay Area being subjected to air quality indexes (AQIs) of 200 and above, in the "unhealthy" region.

== List of wildfires ==
The following is a list of fires that burned more than 1,000 acres (400 ha), or produced significant structural damage or loss of life.

Name	County	Acres	Start date	Containment date (Note: Containment means that fire crews have established and secured control lines around the fire's perimeter. These lines are artificial barriers, like trenches or cleared vegetation, designed to stop the fire's spread, or natural barriers like rivers. Containment reflects progress in managing the fire but does not necessarily mean the fire is starved of fuel, under control, or put out.)	Notes	Ref
Pleasant	Inyo	2,070	February 18, 2018	April 3, 2018	First significant wildfire of the year	
Moffat	Inyo	1,265	April 19, 2018	May 21, 2018		
Nees	Merced	1,756	May 2, 2018	May 17, 2018		
Patterson	Riverside	1,261	May 17, 2018	May 21, 2018		
Panoche	San Benito	64	June 4, 2018	June 7, 2018	3 civilians killed	
Stone	Los Angeles	1,352	June 4, 2018	June 13, 2018		
Airline	San Benito	1,314	June 4, 2018	June 14, 2018		
Apple	Tehama	2,956	June 9, 2018	June 14, 2018	3 residential structures and 2 outbuildings destroyed	
Chrome	Glenn	2,290	June 9, 2018	June 21, 2018	1 outbuilding destroyed	
Lions	Madera	13,347	June 11, 2018	October 1, 2018		
Planada	Merced	4,564	June 15, 2018	June 21, 2018		
Yankee	San Luis Obispo	1,500	June 20, 2018	July 1, 2018		
Lane	Tehama	3,716	June 23, 2018	July 4, 2018	1 injury	
Pawnee	Lake	15,185	June 23, 2018	July 8, 2018	22 structures destroyed, 1 injury	
Creek	Madera	1,678	June 24, 2018	July 5, 2018	4 residential structures and 7 minor structures destroyed	
Waverly	San Joaquin	12,300	June 29, 2018	July 2, 2018		
County	Lake, Napa, Yolo	90,288	June 30, 2018	July 14, 2018	20 structures destroyed; 1 firefighter injured	
Klamathon	Siskiyou	38,008	July 5, 2018	July 16, 2018	82 structures destroyed; 3 injuries, 1 civilian killed	
Valley	San Bernardino	1,350	July 6, 2018	October 22, 2018	5 injured	
Holiday	Santa Barbara	113	July 6, 2018	July 11, 2018	20 structures destroyed	
Pendleton Complex	San Diego	1,800	July 6, 2018	July 11, 2018	Originated as 3 separate fires; burned in Camp Pendleton	
West	San Diego	504	July 6, 2018	July 11, 2018	56 structures destroyed	
Georges	Inyo	2,883	July 8, 2018	July 18, 2018	This was about the time that the wildfire outbreak started and some of the worst wildfires of the season, including the Carr and Mendocino Complex, aka the Ranch Fire/River Fire, began.	
Ferguson	Mariposa	96,901	July 13, 2018	August 18, 2018	19 firefighters injured, 2 firefighters killed; 10 structures destroyed	
Eagle	Modoc	2,100	July 13, 2018	July 17, 2018		
Natchez	Del Norte, Siskiyou	38,134	July 15, 2018	October 30, 2018		
Carr	Shasta	229,651	July 23, 2018	August 30, 2018	1,079 residences, 22 commercial structures, 503 outbuildings destroyed 190 residences, 26 commercial structures, and 63 outbuildings damaged 3 firefighters and 5 civilians killed	
Cranston	Riverside	13,139	July 26, 2018	August 10, 2018	12 buildings destroyed	
Mendocino Complex	Mendocino, Lake, Colusa, Glenn	459,123	July 27, 2018	September 18, 2018	The Ranch and River Fires are collectively called the Mendocino Complex Fire; 157 residential buildings destroyed, 123 others destroyed 13 residential buildings and 24 other buildings damaged 1 firefighter killed, 4 firefighters injured	
Whaleback	Lassen	18,703	July 27, 2018	August 7, 2018		
Butte	Sutter	1,200	July 31, 2018	August 3, 2018		
Donnell	Tuolumne	36,450	August 1, 2018	October 1, 2018	135 structures destroyed; 9 civilians injured	
Tarina	Kern	2,950	August 3, 2018	August 6, 2018		
Pendleton	San Diego	1,000	August 5, 2018	August 6, 2018	Burned in Camp Pendleton	
Turkey	Monterey	2,225	August 6, 2018	August 6, 2018		
Holy	Orange, Riverside	23,136	August 6, 2018	September 13, 2018	18 structures destroyed; 3 firefighters injured	
Five	Kings	2,995	August 6, 2018	August 8, 2018		
Hirz	Shasta	46,150	August 9, 2018	September 12, 2018		
Hat	Shasta	1,900	August 9, 2018	August 16, 2018		
Nelson	Solano	2,162	August 10, 2018	August 12, 2018		
Stone	Modoc	39,387	August 15, 2018	August 29, 2018		
Mill Creek 1	Humboldt	3,674	August 16, 2018	August 30, 2018		
Front	San Luis Obispo, Santa Barbara	1,014	August 19, 2018	August 29, 2018		
North	Placer	1,120	September 3, 2018	September 16, 2018		
Boot	Mono	6,974	September 4, 2018	September 15, 2018		
Kerlin	Trinity	1,751	September 4, 2018	September 17, 2018		
Delta	Shasta	63,311	September 5, 2018	October 7, 2018	Merged into the Hirz Fire; 20 structures destroyed	
Snell	Napa	2,490	September 8, 2018	September 15, 2018		
Charlie	Los Angeles	3,380	September 22, 2018	October 1, 2018		
Alder	Tulare	4,653	October 4, 2018	December 7, 2018	Both of the Alder and Eden Fires, along with the Mountaineer, were the last fires to be put out. All three were 100% contained by the end of December 7.	
Eden	Tulare	1,777	October 4, 2018	December 7, 2018	Both of the Alder and Eden Fires, along with the Mountaineer, were the last fires to be put out. All three were 100% contained by the end of December 7.	
Branscombe	Solano	4,700	October 7, 2018	November 9, 2018	4 structures destroyed	
Sun	Tehama	3,889	October 7, 2018	October 12, 2018		
Mountaineer	Tulare	1,270	October 13, 2018	December 7, 2018	This fire, along with the Alder and Eden fires, were the last fires to be put out, marking the end of the fire season.	
Camp	Butte	153,336	November 8, 2018	November 25, 2018	5 firefighters injured, 85 civilian deaths, 12 civilians injured, 1 civilian missing; 18,804 structures destroyed, 564 structures damaged; destroyed the town of Paradise. Costliest wildfire recorded in the modern era, along with being the most deadly and destructive.	
Nurse	Solano	1,500	November 8, 2018	November 27, 2018		
Hill	Ventura	4,531	November 8, 2018	November 15, 2018	4 structures destroyed	
Woolsey	Los Angeles, Ventura	96,949	November 8, 2018	November 22, 2018	3 civilians killed, 1,643 structures destroyed, 364 damaged	

== Fatalities ==
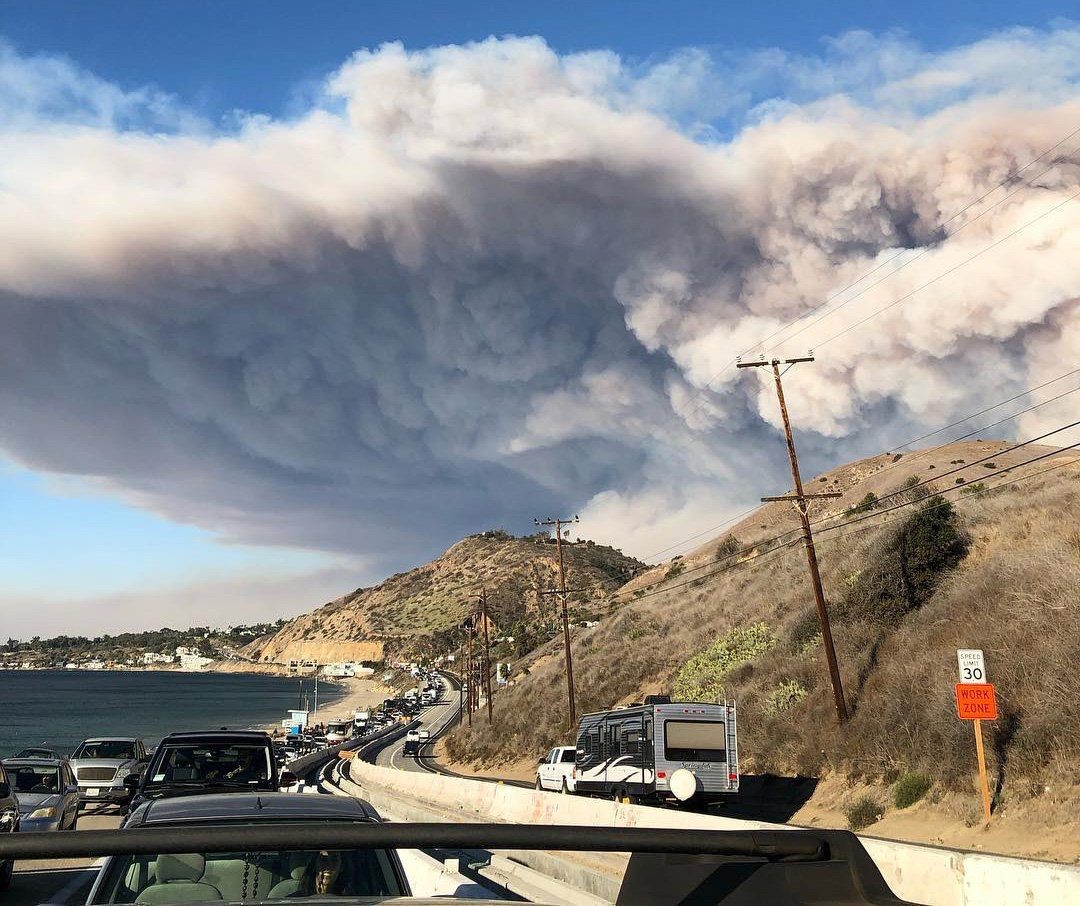
The Woolsey Fire encroaching on Malibu on November 9 2018

On June 4, the Panoche Fire broke out, in a series of three blazes that started in the San Benito County area. While the Panoche incident was the smallest of the three fires, burning only 64 acres (26 ha), the remains of three people were found in a destroyed camping trailer in the burn area. The remains were believed to belong to a mother, a toddler, and an infant.

On July 14, a Cal Fire bulldozer operator was killed while fighting the Ferguson Fire, becoming the first firefighter death of the season.

On July 23, the Carr Fire broke out after a vehicle malfunctioned. While the Carr Fire burned in rural areas of Shasta County for the first few days, it crossed the Sacramento River and entered the city limits of Redding, California on the evening of July 26. By the next morning, two firefighters and four civilians had been killed.

On July 29, a firefighter with the National Park Service was killed after a dead tree fell and struck him, while he was fighting the Ferguson Fire. He was "treated on scene, but died before he could be taken to the hospital".

On August 4, a Pacific Gas and Electric Company employee was killed in a vehicle incident while working to restore services to areas impacted by the Carr Fire.

On August 9, a Cal Fire heavy equipment mechanic was killed in a traffic incident while working at the Carr Fire.

On August 13, a firefighter was killed while fighting the Mendocino Complex Fire.

On November 8, 2018, 85 civilians were killed by the Camp Fire, while three firefighters were injured. The number dead had been listed at 87, lowered to 85 by early December when it was discovered one victim was put in several bags. Three people also died during the Woolsey Fire near Malibu.

== Verizon Wireless data throttling ==
In August 2018, the Santa Clara County Fire Department raised claims against Verizon Wireless that their "unlimited" data service had been throttled while the fire department was attempting to contain the Mendocino Complex Fire. The Verizon contract stated that the department's plan would be throttled down to 200 kbit/s or 600 kbit/s once the department had used 25 GB in a single month. However, the contract stated that the usage related throttling would not apply in certain emergency situations, such as wildfire containment operations. The plan remained throttled, despite the department's notification to Verizon regarding the situation.

== Gallery ==
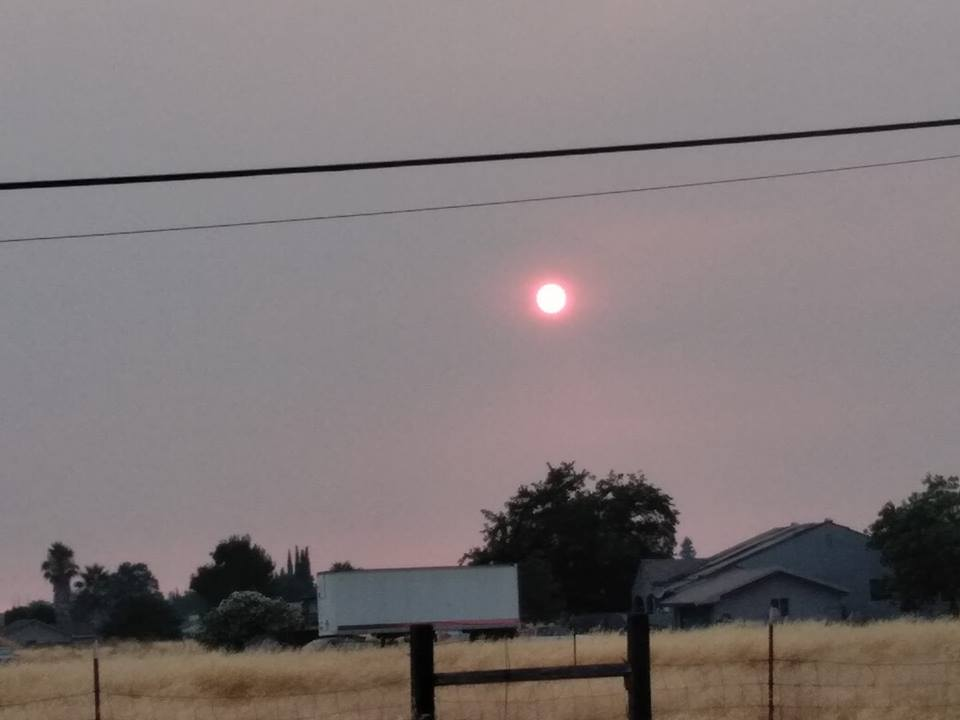
Photograph of smoky sky near sunset in early August looking toward the west, in Sacramento, California. The smoke was produced by the wildfires.

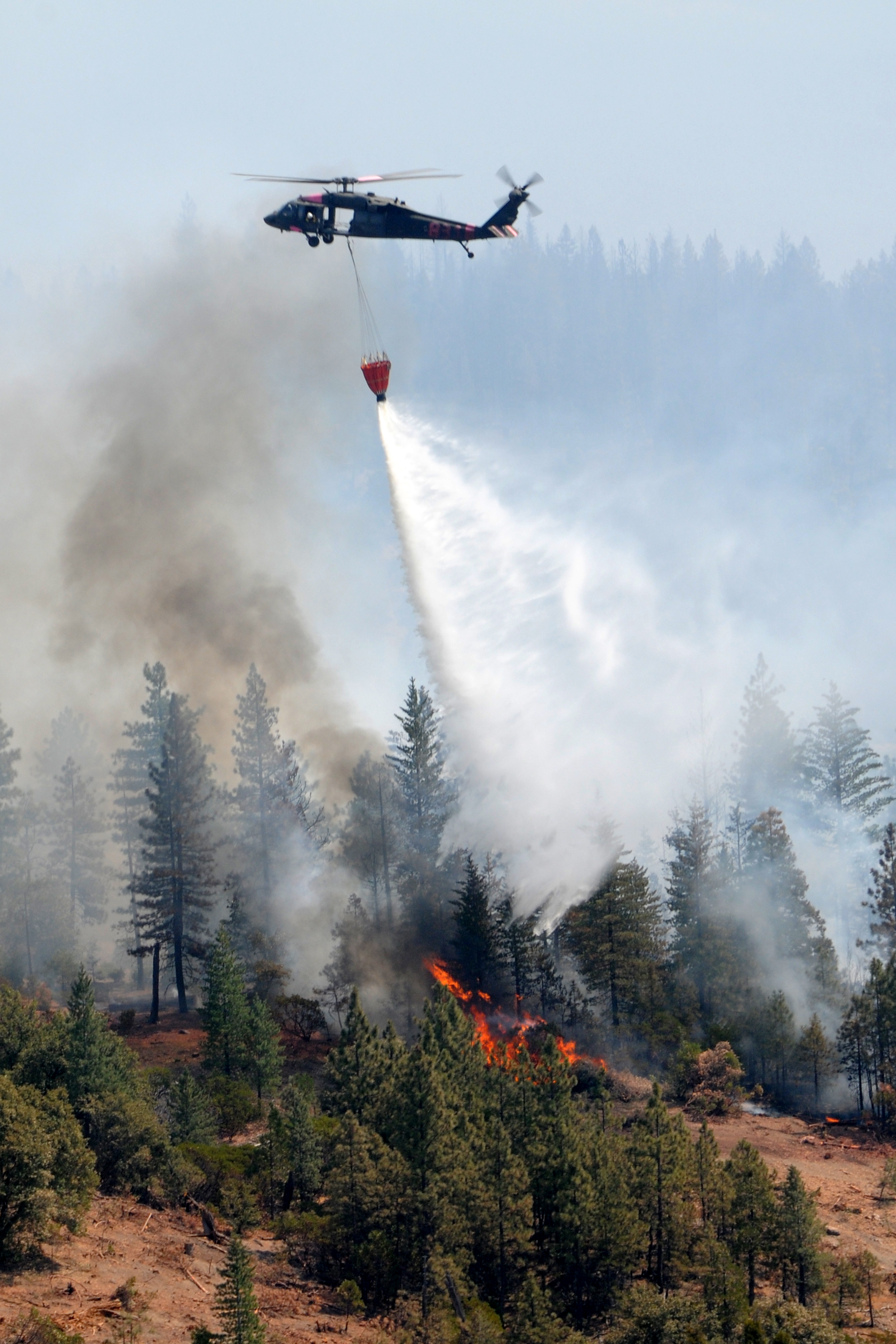
California National Guard battles wildfires.

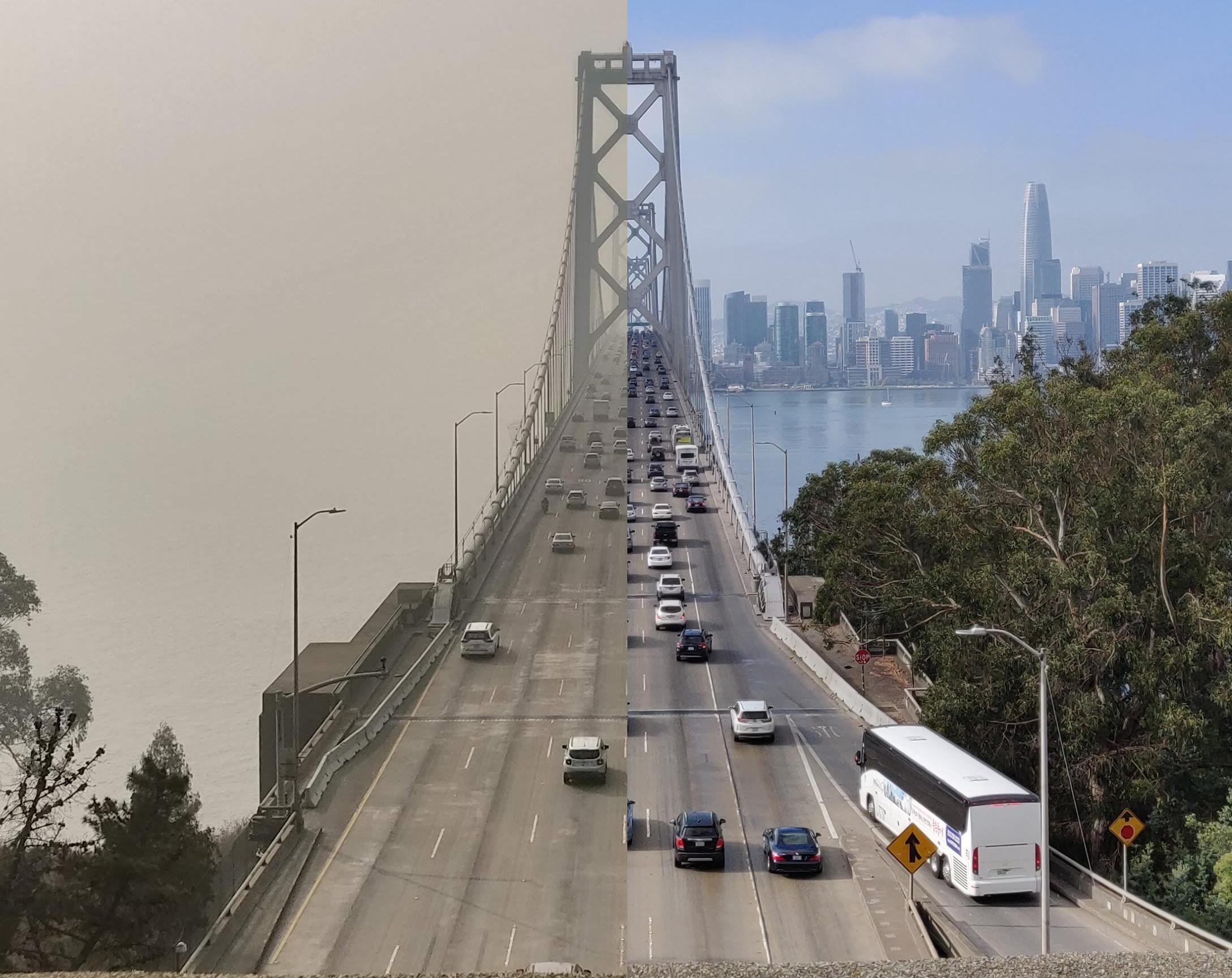
The Bay Bridge in San Francisco, California. The photo on the left was taken November 16, 2018 and the one on the right October 14, 2018.

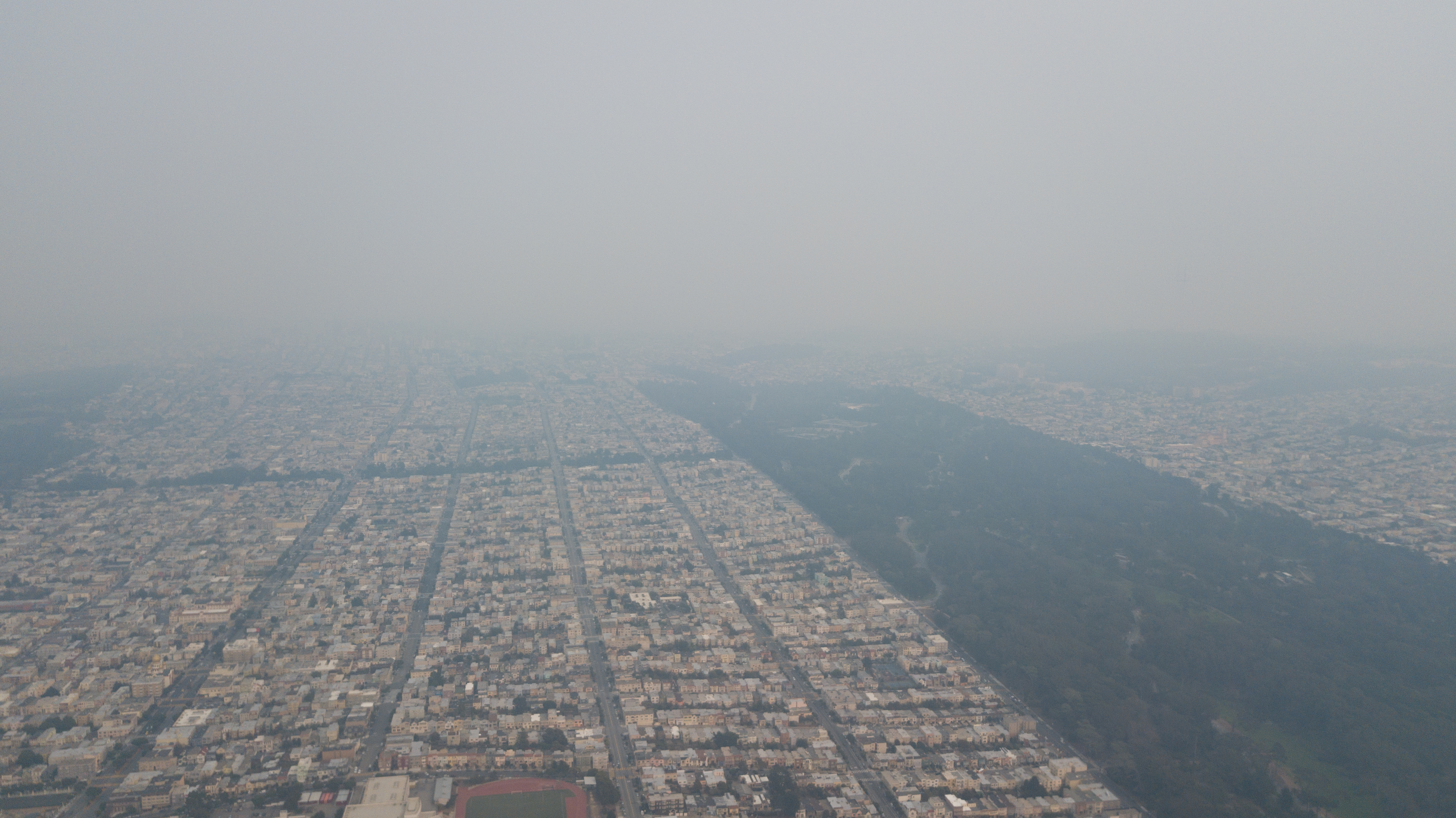
Golden Gate Park as seen by drone during the Camp Fire
Maps of significant wildfires in 2018 in California

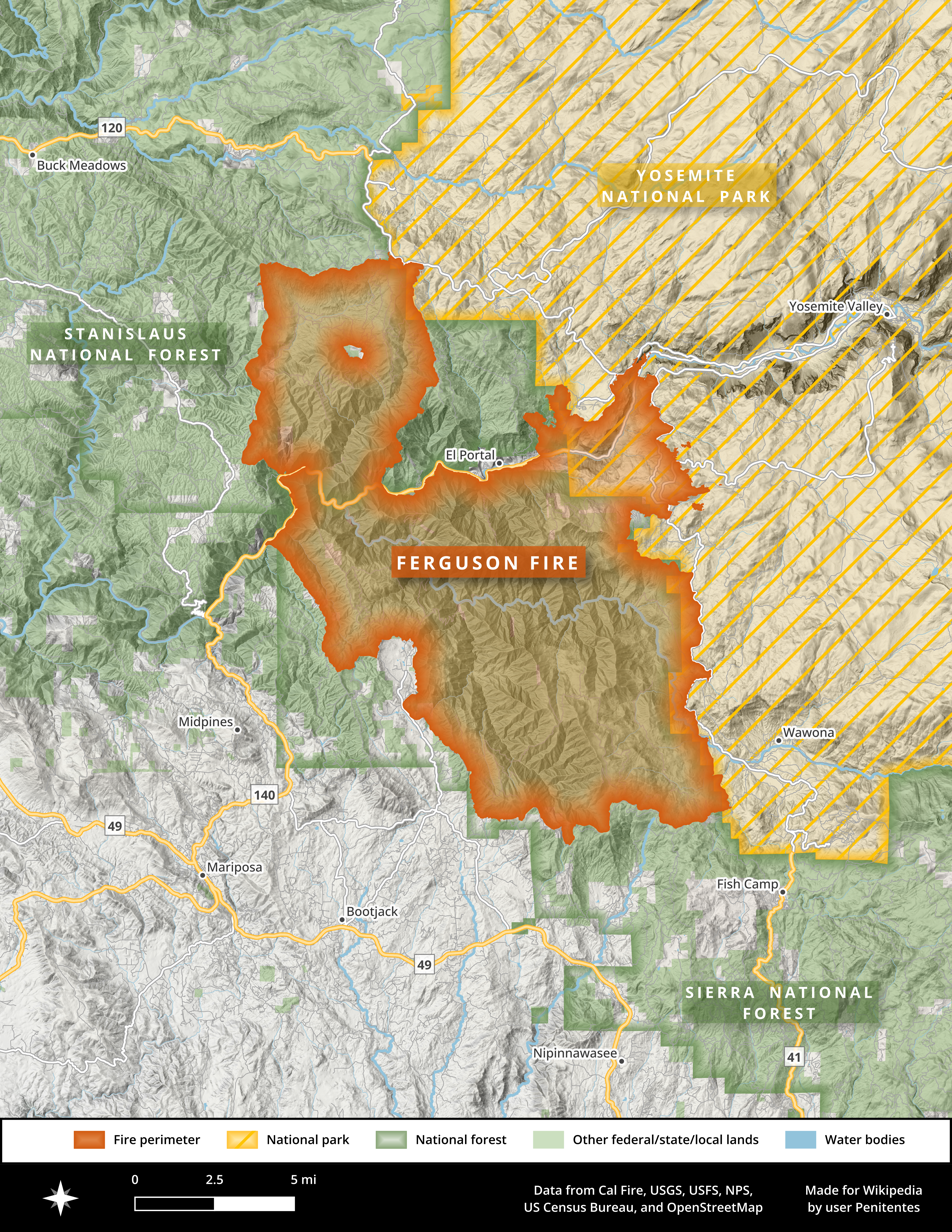
Ferguson Fire

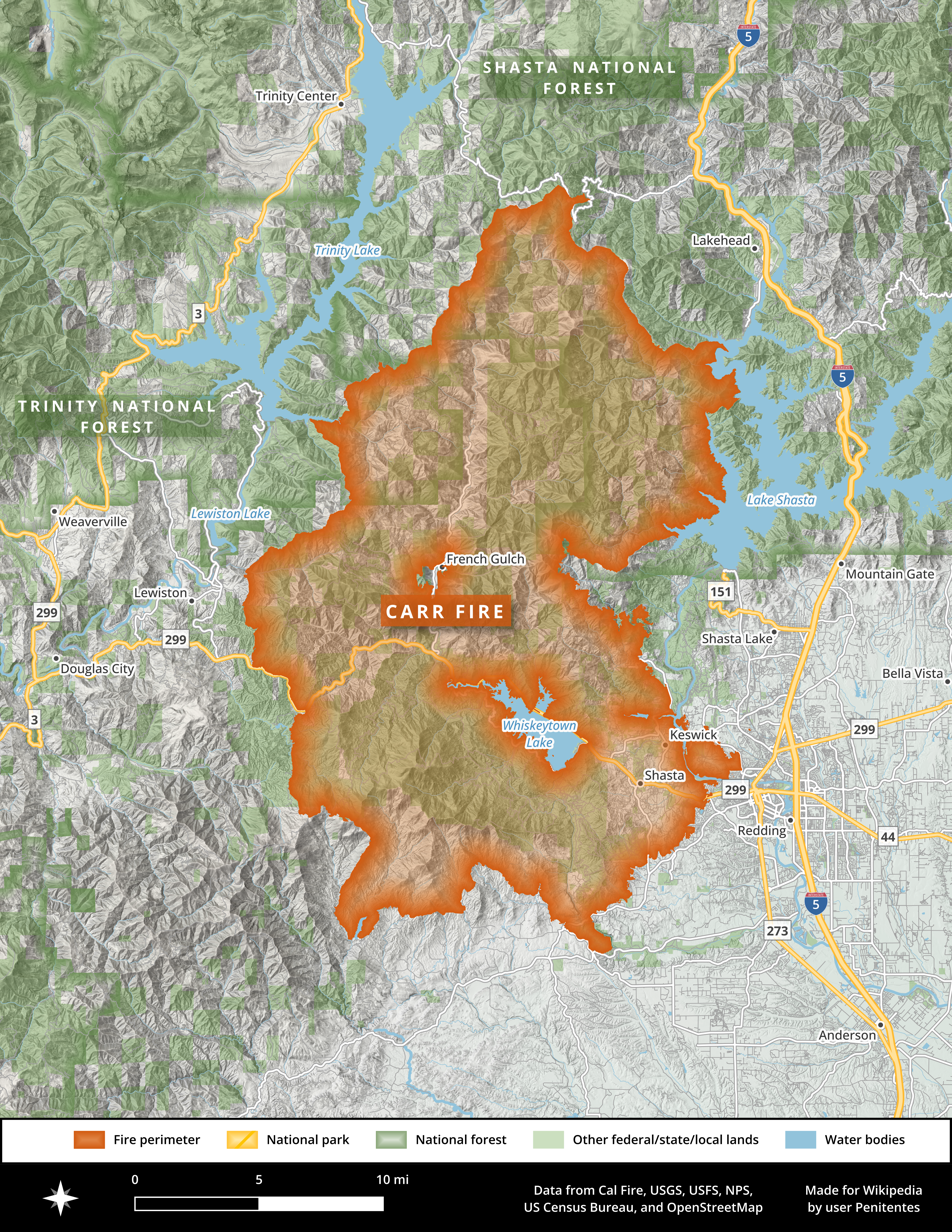
Carr Fire

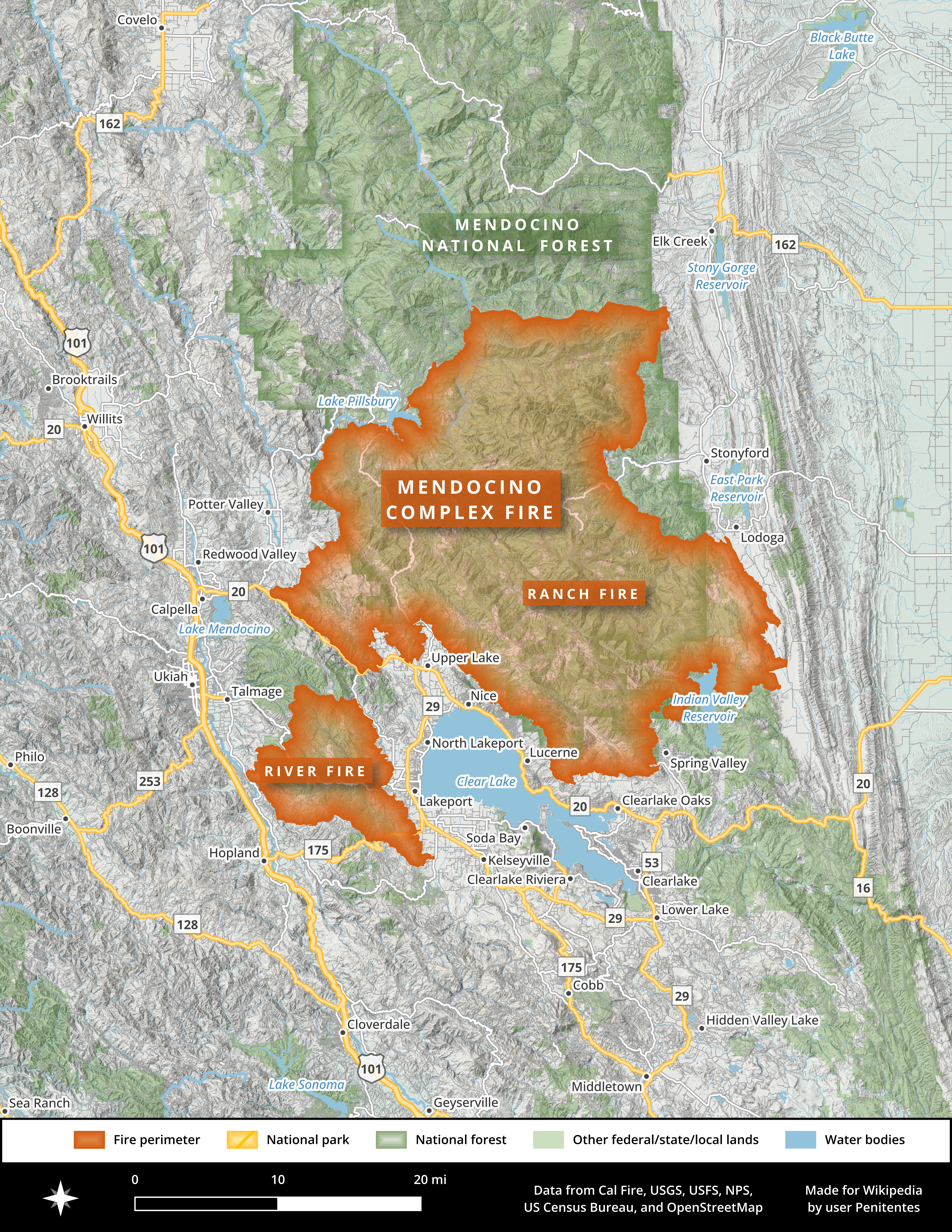
Mendocino Complex Fire

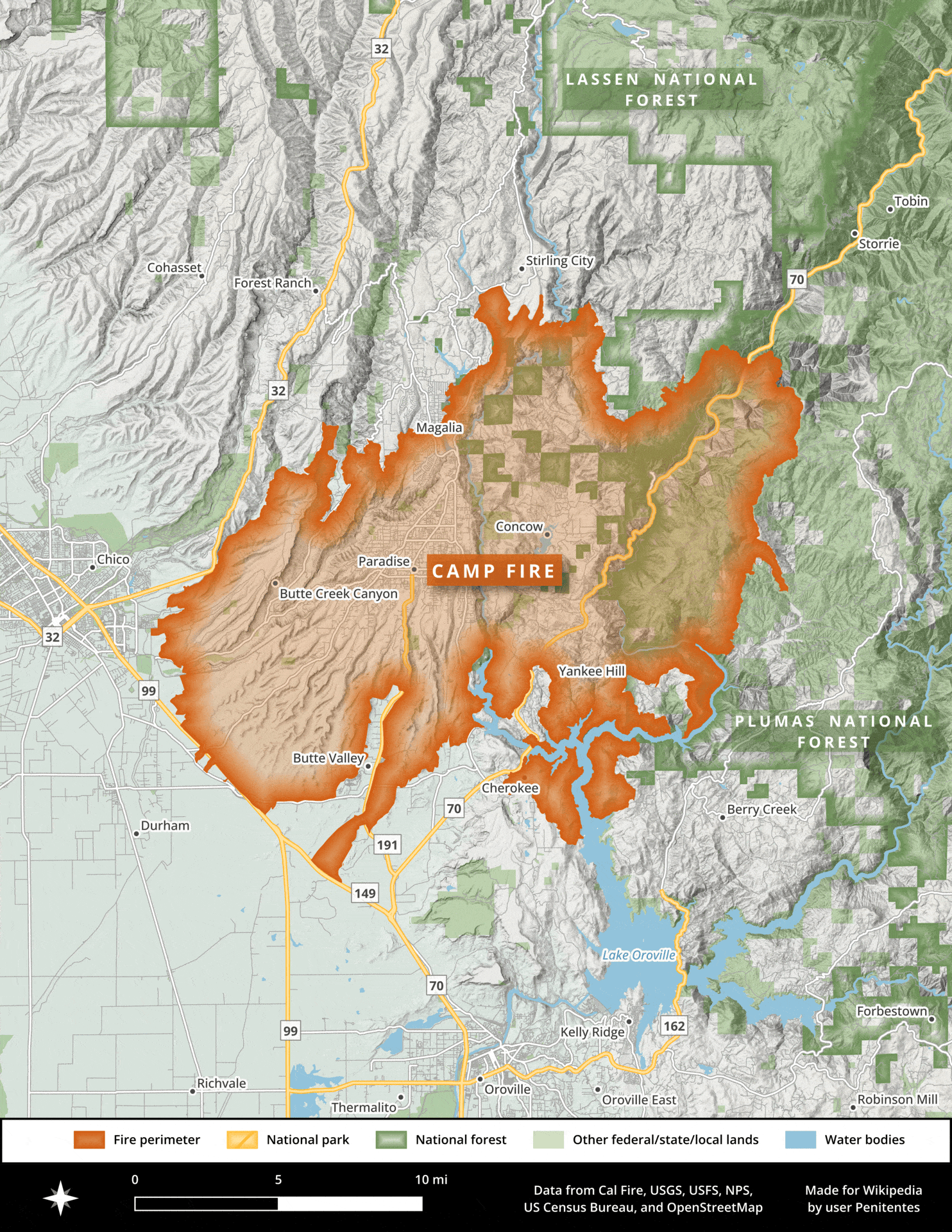
Camp Fire

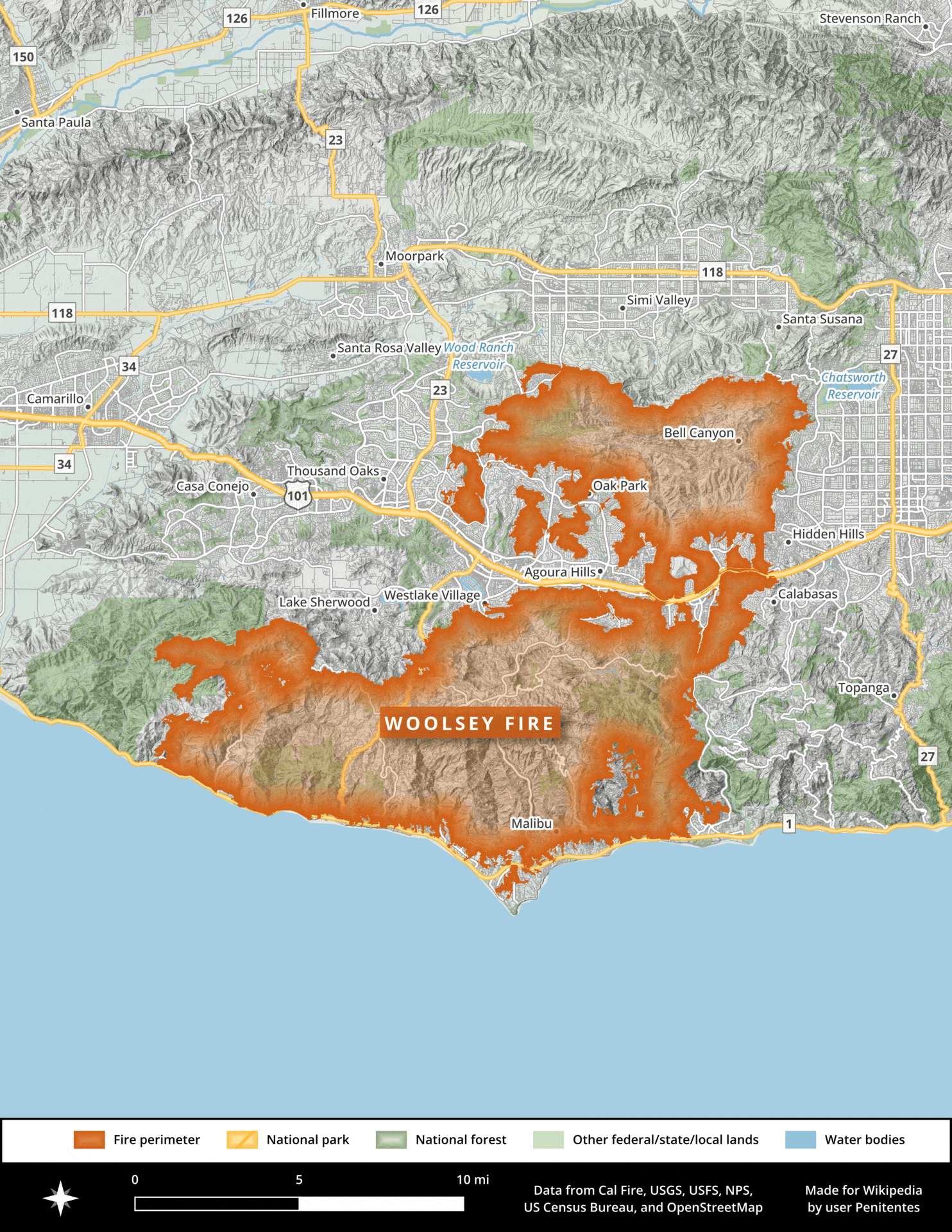
Woolsey Fire

== See also ==
- Climate change in California
- List of California wildfires
- October 2017 Northern California wildfires
- December 2017 Southern California wildfires
