= Spring Valley, Lake County, California =

Spring Valley, California
- Census-designated place
- Position in California.
- Coordinates: 39°04′48″N 122°35′47″W
- Country: United States
- State: California
- County: Lake

Area
  - Total: 4.974 sq mi (12.883 km^{2})
  - Land: 4.935 sq mi (12.781 km^{2})
  - Water: 0.039 sq mi (0.102 km^{2}) 0.79%
- Elevation: 1,581 ft (482 m)

Population (2020)
  - Total: 964
  - Density: 195/sq mi (75.4/km^{2})
- Time zone: UTC-8 (Pacific (PST))
  - Summer (DST): UTC-7 (PDT)
- GNIS feature ID: 2583149

Spring Valley is a census-designated place in Lake County, California. Spring Valley sits at an elevation of 1,581 feet (482 m). The 2020 United States census reported Spring Valley's population was 964.

== Demographics ==
Historical population
Census	Pop.	Note	%±
2010	845		—
2020	964		14.1%
U.S. Decennial Census; 1860–1870 1880-1890; 1900 1910 1920; 1930 1940 1950; 1960 1970 1980; 1990 2000 2010; 2020

=== 2020 census ===
Spring Valley CDP, Lake County, California – Racial and ethnic composition Note: the US Census treats Hispanic/Latino as an ethnic category. This table excludes Latinos from the racial categories and assigns them to a separate category. Hispanics/Latinos may be of any race.
Race / Ethnicity (NH = Non-Hispanic)	Pop 2010	Pop 2020	% 2010	% 2020
White alone (NH)	734	584	86.86%	60.58%
Black or African American alone (NH)	15	14	1.78%	1.45%
Native American or Alaska Native alone (NH)	7	15	0.83%	1.56%
Asian alone (NH)	5	19	0.59%	1.97%
Native Hawaiian or Pacific Islander alone (NH)	3	0	0.36%	0.00%
Other race alone (NH)	0	6	0.00%	0.62%
Mixed race or Multiracial (NH)	10	142	1.18%	14.73%
Hispanic or Latino (any race)	71	184	8.40%	19.09%
Total	845	964	100.00%	100.00%

The 2020 United States census reported that Spring Valley had a population of 964. The population density was 195.3 inhabitants per square mile (75.4/km^{2}). The racial makeup of Spring Valley was 608 (63.1%) White, 14 (1.5%) African American, 16 (1.7%) Native American, 21 (2.2%) Asian, 1 (0.1%) Pacific Islander, 116 (12.0%) from other races, and 188 (19.5%) from two or more races. Hispanic or Latino of any race were 184 persons (19.1%).

The census reported that 954 people (99.0% of the population) lived in households and 10 (1.0%) were institutionalized.

There were 401 households, out of which 74 (18.5%) had children under the age of 18 living in them, 147 (36.7%) were married-couple households, 40 (10.0%) were cohabiting couple households, 92 (22.9%) had a female householder with no partner present, and 122 (30.4%) had a male householder with no partner present. 145 households (36.2%) were one person, and 80 (20.0%) were one person aged 65 or older. The average household size was 2.38. There were 213 families (53.1% of all households).

The age distribution was 170 people (17.6%) under the age of 18, 64 people (6.6%) aged 18 to 24, 234 people (24.3%) aged 25 to 44, 262 people (27.2%) aged 45 to 64, and 234 people (24.3%) who were 65 years of age or older. The median age was 46.6 years. For every 100 females, there were 103.4 males.

There were 452 housing units at an average density of 91.6 units per square mile (35.4 units/km^{2}), of which 401 (88.7%) were occupied. Of these, 327 (81.5%) were owner-occupied, and 74 (18.5%) were occupied by renters.

== See also ==
- Pawnee Fire
