= Waverly Fire =

2018 wildfire in California

- Part of the 2018 California wildfires
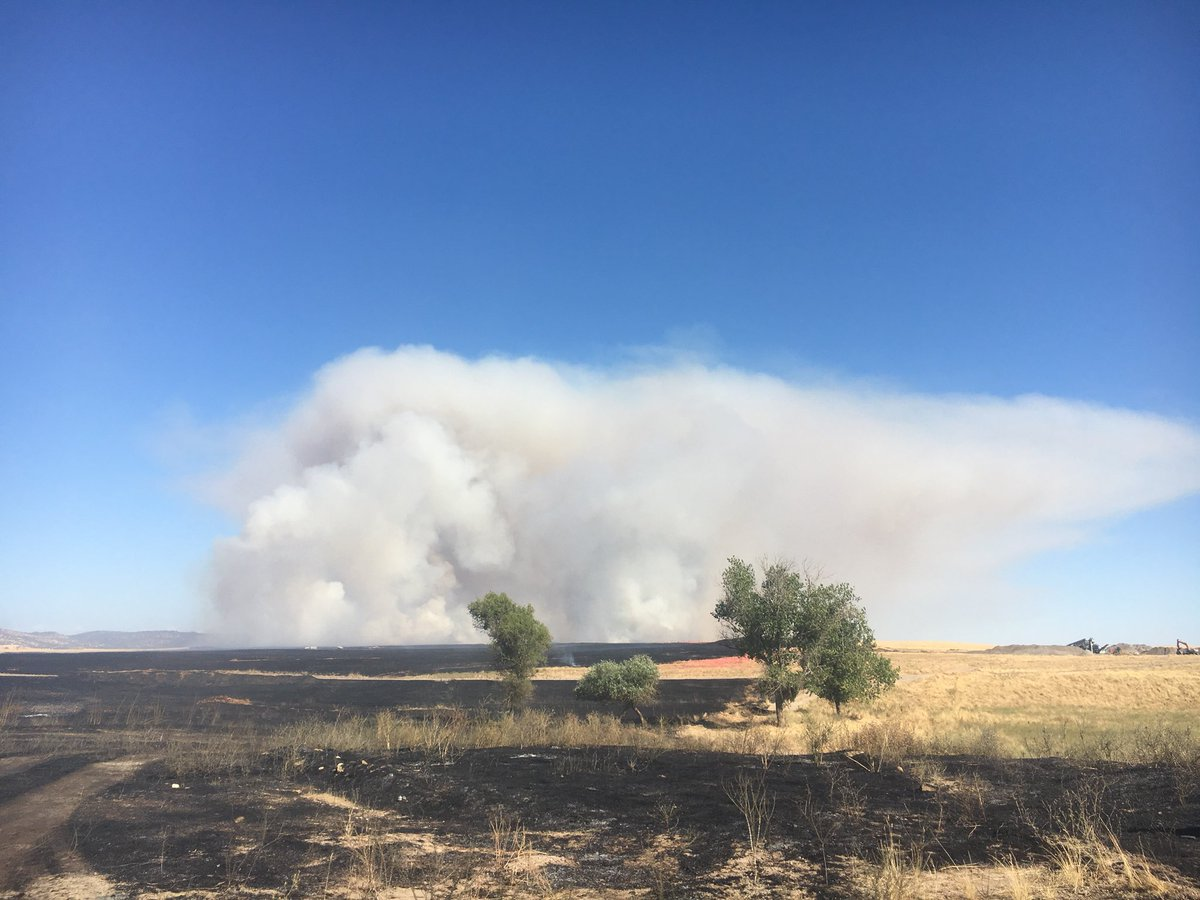
- The Waverly Fire on June 29, 2018
- Date: June 29, 2018 –; July 2, 2018
- Location: Linden, San Joaquin County, California, United States

Statistics
- Burned area: 12,300 acres (50 km^{2})

Ignition
- Cause: Unknown

The Waverly Fire was a wildfire near Linden in the San Joaquin County, California, in the United States. The fire was first reported on June 29, 2018. It burned a total of 12,300 acres (50 km^{2}), before being contained on July 2. The fire impacted traffic on Highway 26, Highway 4 and the community of Milton.

== Progression ==
The Waverly Fire was reported on June 29, 2018, by CALFIRE's air attack in eastern San Joaquin County near Linden. Upon discovery, the fire had burned 150 acres (1 km^{2}) of grassland. The fire tripled in size within an hour, with air support being called in by CALFIRE. Milton Road was closed and the community of Milton was evacuated. By the evening, the fire had grown to 12,300 acres (50 km^{2}) and 65 percent containment. Evacuation and road closures were lifted.

The fire was 100 percent contained at 12,300 acres (50 km^{2}) on July 2.
