= Paynes Creek, California =

Paynes Creek
- census-designated place
- Position in California.
- Coordinates: 40°20′40″N 121°54′47″W
- Country: United States
- State: California
- County: Tehama

Area
  - Total: 3.433 sq mi (8.891 km^{2})
  - Land: 3.432 sq mi (8.888 km^{2})
  - Water: 0.0015 sq mi (0.004 km^{2}) 0.04%
- Elevation: 1,949 ft (594 m)

Population (2020)
  - Total: 54
  - Density: 16/sq mi (6.1/km^{2})
- Time zone: UTC-8 (Pacific (PST))
  - Summer (DST): UTC-7 (PDT)
- ZIP Code: 96075
- Area code: 530
- GNIS feature ID: 2628773

Paynes Creek is a census-designated place (CDP) in Tehama County, California, United States. It is 23 miles (37 km) east of Red Bluff. Its ZIP code is 96075 and telephone prefixes follow (530-597-xxxx), which is shared with the town of Dales, approximately 9 miles (14 km) to the west. Paynes Creek sits at an elevation of 1,949 feet (594 m). The 2020 United States census reported Paynes Creek's population was 54.

In late July 2024, the town of Paynes Creek was significantly impacted and partially destroyed by the Park Fire with no recorded fatalities. The town is currently evacuated and it is unknown when or if repopulation will begin. Paynes Creek remains a census-designated place.

== History ==
A post office called Paynes Creek was established in 1890, and remained in operation until 1973. The town is named for the eponymous watercourse Payne's Creek.

== Geography ==
According to the United States Census Bureau, the CDP covers an area of 3.4 square miles (8.9 km^{2}), of which 99.96% is land and 0.04% is water.

== Demographics ==
Historical population
Census	Pop.	Note	%±
2010	57		—
2020	54		−5.3%
U.S. Decennial Census; 1860–1870 1880-1890; 1900 1910 1920; 1930 1940 1950; 1960 1970 1980; 1990 2000 2010

Paynes Creek first appeared as a census designated place in the 2010 U.S. census.

The 2020 United States census reported that Paynes Creek had a population of 54. The population density was 15.7 inhabitants per square mile (6.1/km^{2}). The racial makeup of Paynes Creek was 43 (80%) White, 1 (2%) African American, 2 (4%) Native American, 0 (0%) Asian, 0 (0%) Pacific Islander, 0 (0%) from other races, and 8 (15%) from two or more races. Hispanic or Latino of any race were 6 persons (11%).

There were 20 households, and the average household size was 2.70.

The age distribution was 8 people (15%) under the age of 18, 2 people (4%) aged 18 to 24, 11 people (20%) aged 25 to 44, 21 people (39%) aged 45 to 64, and 12 people (22%) who were 65 years of age or older. The median age was 54.0 years.

There were 36 housing units, of which 20 were occupied, all by homeowners.

== Politics ==
In the state legislature, Paynes Creek is in the 1st senatorial district, represented by Republican Megan Dahle, and in the 3rd Assembly district, represented by Vacant.

Federally, Paynes Creek is in California's 1st congressional district, represented by Republican James Gallagher.

== Ecology ==
The Payne's Creek vicinity contains forested reaches, and also provides habitat for numerous understory flora and fauna. An example wildflower found in the vicinity is the mariposa lily Calochortus luteus, which is at its northern limit at the location of the Payne's Creek watershed.

== See also ==
- Lane Fire
