= Lions Fire =

2018 wildfire in California

- Part of the 2018 California wildfires
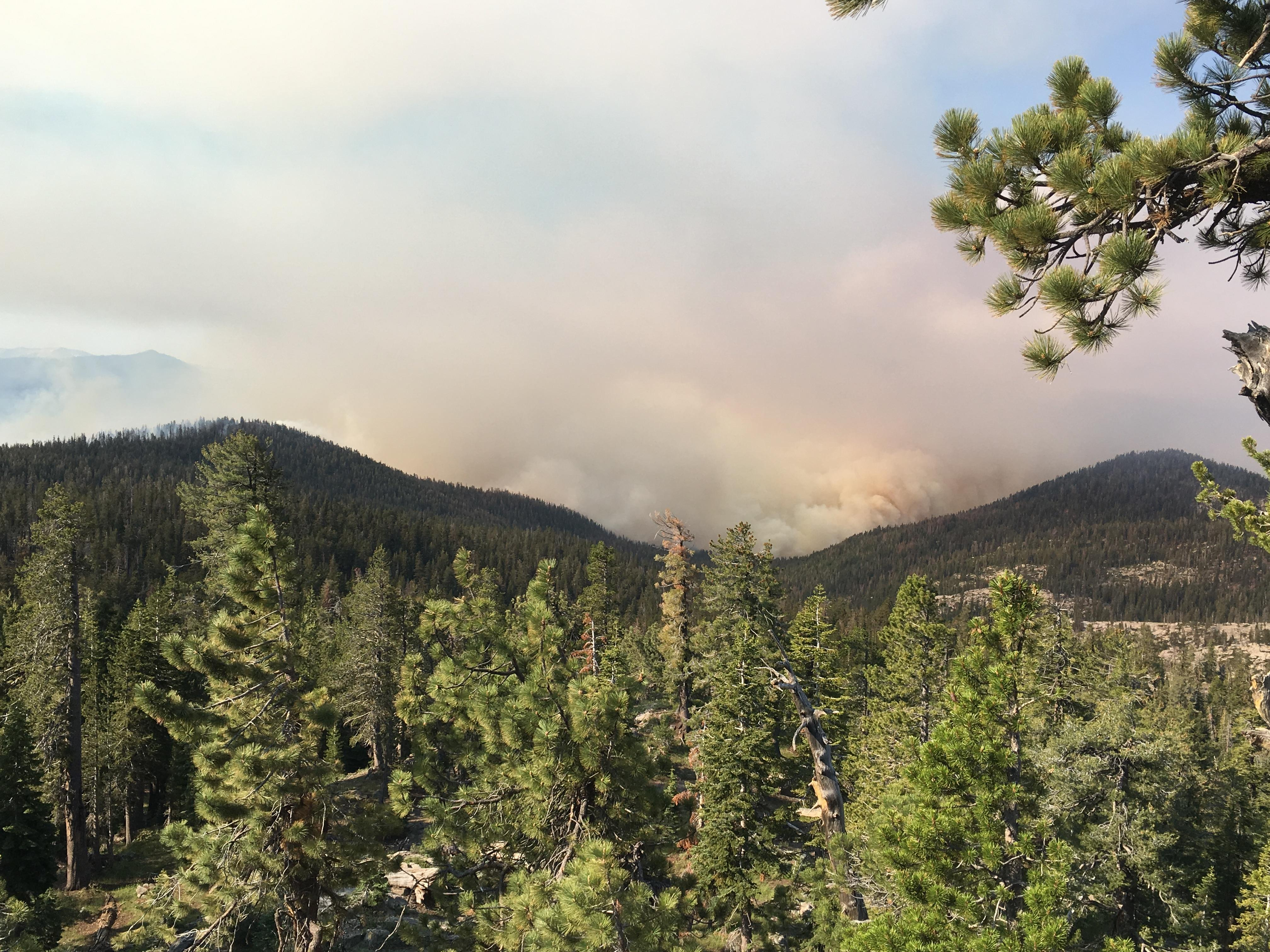
- Date: June 11, 2018 –; October 1, 2018
- Location: Ansel Adams Wilderness, Sierra National Forest and Inyo National Forest, California, United States
- Coordinates: 37.571°N 119.118°W

Statistics
- Burned area: 13,347 acres (54 km^{2})
- Land use: National forest

Impacts
- Deaths: None
- Injuries: None

Ignition
- Cause: Lightning

Map
- Location of fire in California.

The Lions Fire was a wildfire in the Ansel Adams Wilderness in Inyo National Forest and the Sierra National Forest in California in the United States. The fire was started by a lightning strike and first reported on June 11, 2018. The fire impacted recreational activities in both national forests, as well as access to Devils Postpile National Monument. The Lions Fire burned a total of 13,347 acres (54 km^{2}), before burning out on October 1.

== Progression ==
The Lions Fire was reported around noon on June 11, 2018. Started by a lightning strike, it was spotted near Lion Point in the Ansel Adams Wilderness in the Sierra National Forest. On June 22, the fire crossed into Inyo National Forest. The next day, the fire had spread due to heavy winds, growing to over 1,000 acres (4 km^{2}) and moving closer to Mammoth Lakes at approximately seven miles southwest. The Lions Fire has been burning in high elevations, approximately 6,000 to 8,000 feet in elevation, thriving on red fir.

Strong winds overnight expanded the fire to 2,383 acres (10 km^{2}). A temporary flight restriction was put in place over a five-mile radius on June 25. By the next day, the fire had burned into the Stairway Creek, northwest of the middle fork of the San Joaquin River. It also reached the Butte Fire (2017) footprint, which slowed the Lions Fire's westward movement. The Lions Fires expanded to over 3,000 acres (12 km^{2}) by the morning of June 28. As of June 30, the fire had slowed its progression and was seven percent contained and had burned 3,300 acres (13 km^{2}).

July 1 marked the fourth day of burn-out operations on the Lions Fire. By July 5, the fire had grown to 4,000 acres (16 km^{2}) and was 60 percent contained, due to lack of fire growth and crews reinforcing firelines, to mitigate concerns about dryer weather and high winds. Air quality remained poor in Mammoth Lakes and the surrounding areas.

By late August, the growth of the Lions Fire slowed, with containment gradually increasing. On October 1, 2018, InciWeb declared the Lions Fire to be inactive, as no more hotspots were detected within the fire perimeter. By then, the fire had burned at total of 13,347 acres (54.01 km^{2}).

== Effects ==
=== Health ===
Wind patterns caused the fire's smoke to impact the air quality of Mammoth Lakes and other areas east of the fire.

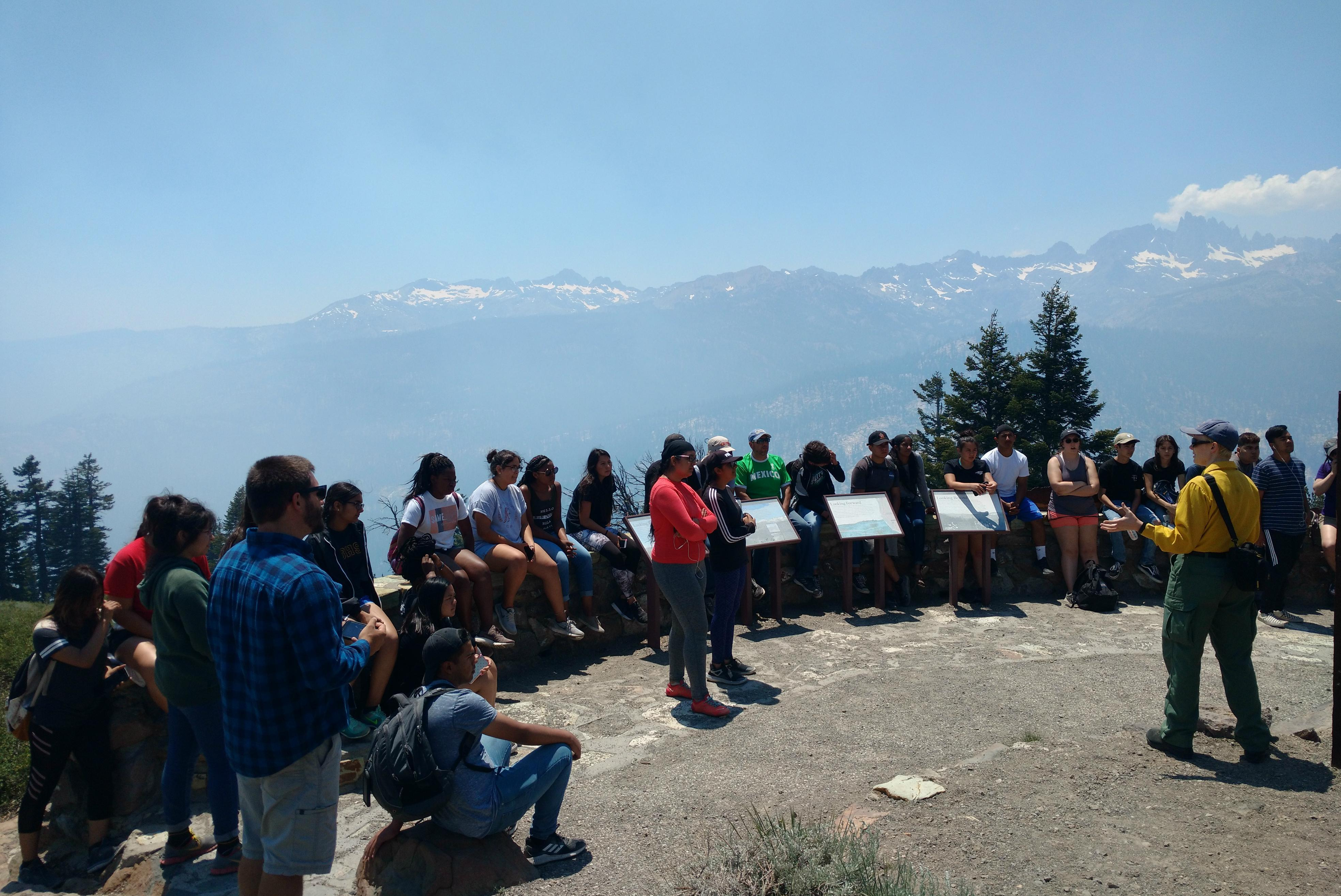
A Lions Fire public information officer describes the fire and fire ecology to a group of students at Minaret Vista on July 1, 2018

=== Recreation ===
The Lions fire impacted visitor access to the Ansel Adams Wilderness, during which trails, in both Inyo and Sierra National Forests, heading towards the fire zone were closed to hikers.

=== Environment ===
Due to the fire's location in a designated wilderness area, fire crews used Minimum Impact Suppression Tactics, such as air assistance and hand construction, to minimize their impact on the landscape, supporting a healthy ecosystem. This also provides for better firefighter safety and reduction of hazardous vegetation.
