= Pawnee Fire =

2018 wildfire in Northern California

- Part of the 2018 California wildfires
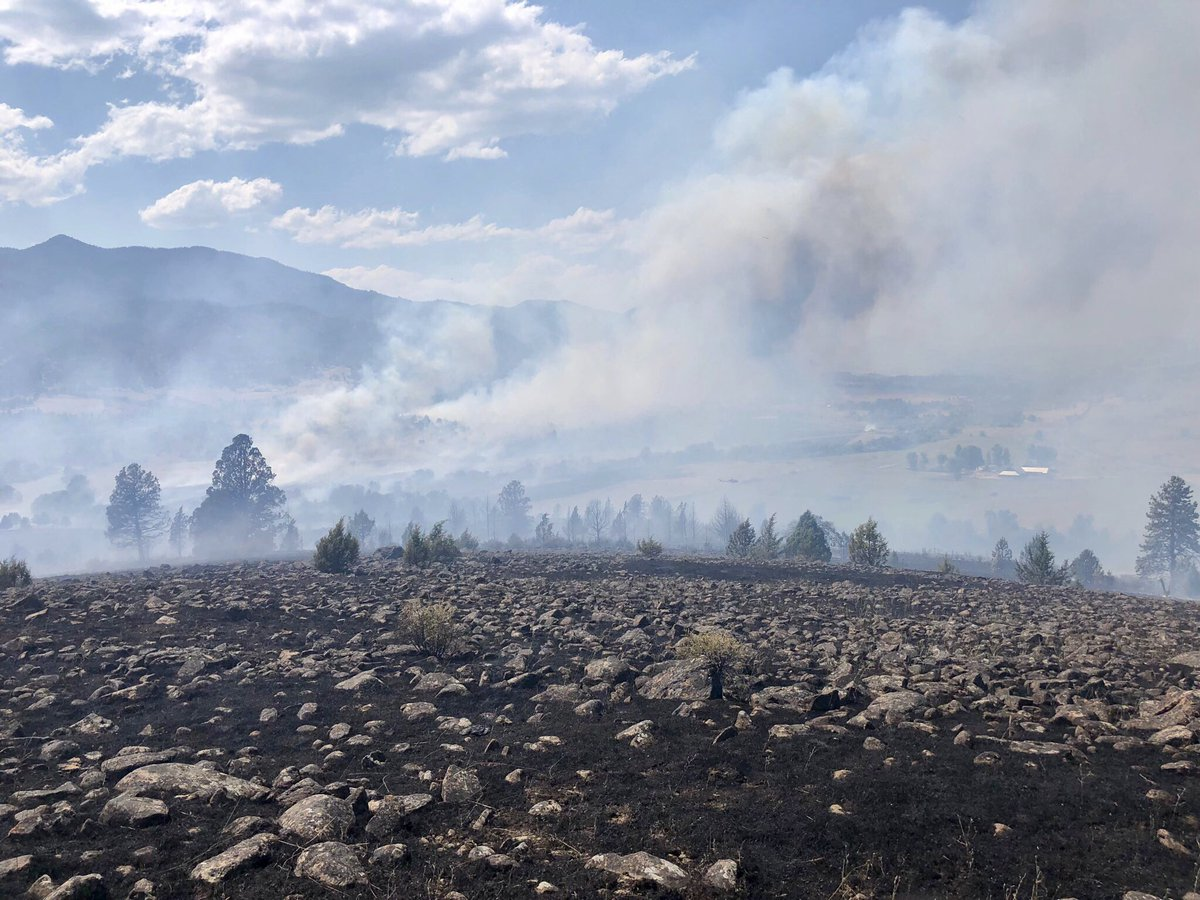
- Pawnee Fire
- Date: June 23, 2018 –; July 8, 2018
- Location: Spring Valley, California, United States
- Coordinates: 39.0674°N 122.59848°W

Statistics
- Burned area: 15,185 acres (61 km^{2})

Impacts
- Injuries: 1
- Structures lost: 22
- Cost: >$36.5 million (2018 USD)

Ignition
- Cause: Target shooting

Map
- Location of fire in California.

The Pawnee Fire was a large wildfire that burned in Spring Valley in Lake County, California, in the United States. The fire started on June 23, 2018, and quickly expanded overnight, destroying 12 structures, and causing the evacuation of the entire Spring Valley area. It destroyed 22 structures, damaged six structures, and burned a total of 15,185 acres (61 km^{2}) before it was fully contained on July 8, 2018. A Cal Fire investigation determined in April 2019 the cause of the fire was target shooting.

== Progression ==
=== June 23 – June 30 ===
The Pawnee Fire was reported on June 23, 2018 around 5:21 p.m. on Pawnee Rd. and New Long Valley Rd. in Spring Valley in California, near Clearlake Oaks. After further investigation, the fire was cited as being off Quail Trail. The fire is located on a ridge, making it hard to access for fire crews. Driven by dry conditions, high temperatures and gusty winds, the fire grew to 2,500 acres (10 km^{2}) overnight and had destroyed twelve structures, including ten homes. Mandatory evacuations were put in place for the Spring Valley community.

By Sunday evening, the fire was described as "out of control" by Cal Fire and by the next morning, June 25, it had grown to 8,200 acres (33 km^{2}) and had destroyed 10 more buildings. By the evening of June 25, the Pawnee Fire had expanded to 10,500 acres (42 km^{2}), with five percent contained. Authorities closed select intersections along California State Route 20. On June 26, additional road closures were put in place along Highway 20 and intersections off Brim Road.

On June 30, the fire has burned 13,850 acres (56 km^{2}) and is 73 percent contained. Mandatory evacuations remain in place for Double Eagle and evacuation advisories were put in place for numerous areas off Highway 20.

=== July 1 – July 8 ===
By July 1, the Pawnee Fire had grown to 14,500 acres (59 km^{2}) and was 73 percent contained. The fire continued to threaten 50 buildings, with over 2,000 crews fighting the fire. Additional road closures were put in place. The fire continue to grow - both in containment and size. Thus far, 22 buildings were destroyed and six` were damaged, with 50 remaining threatened entering into the Fourth of July week. One firefighter was reported injured.

Late on July 8, the Pawnee Fire was fully contained, with the burn area totaling 15,185 acres (61 km^{2}).

== Effects ==
The Pawnee Fire impacted residents of the Spring Valley community, who went under mandatory evacuation on June 23, the day the fire was reported. Authorities shut down access to Spring Valley from Highway 20. Residents of the Walker Ridge and Double Eagle neighborhoods were under mandatory evacuation for the majority of the time until the fire's containment.

The fire destroyed a total of 22 structures, including 12 homes in Spring Valley. One firefighter was injured.

== See also ==
- October 2017 Northern California wildfires
  - Tubbs Fire
- Thomas Fire
