= Hites Cove, California =

Unincorporated community in California, United States

Hites Cove
- Unincorporated community
- Location in California Hites Cove (the United States)
- Coordinates: 37°38′27″N 119°50′57″W
- Country: United States
- State: California
- County: Mariposa County
- Elevation: 1,578 ft (481 m)
- GNIS feature ID: 1656072

Hites Cove (also called Hite's Cove, less commonly Hite Cove) was a former settlement in Mariposa County, California. It was located on the South Fork of the Merced River, 4.5 miles (7.2 km) west-southwest of El Portal. It is accessed via Hites Cove Road.

The Hites Cove post office operated from 1868 to 1869, and from 1878 to 1889. The Hite post office operated from 1901 to 1902. The name honors gold prospector John Hite.

Hite discovered a vein of gold-bearing quartz at the site in 1861, and enlisted a crew of men to dig a tunnel along the quartz vein and to construct a stamp mill. A hotel and store were soon constructed at the site. The camp was prosperous for about twenty years after the initial gold discovery, but faded soon after. In 1968, foundations, retaining walls, and rusted mining machinery could still be found at the site. The site is now a popular hiking destination, with some stone foundations still visible as of 2010.
