= Chowchilla Mountains =

Californian mountain range

- Location within California

Highest point
- Elevation: 1,768 m (5,801 ft)

Geography
- Country: United States
- State: California
- District: Mariposa County
- Range coordinates: 37°31′29.771″N 119°43′18.581″W
- Topo map: USGS Wawona

The Chowchilla Mountains are a mountain range in Mariposa County, California.
