= Incline, California =

Unincorporated community in California, United States

Incline
- Unincorporated community
- Location in California Incline (the United States)
- Coordinates: 37°39′38″N 119°51′10″W
- Country: United States
- State: California
- County: Mariposa County
- Elevation: 1,519 ft (463 m)
- GNIS feature ID: 1656087

Incline (formerly, Indian Flat) is an unincorporated community in Mariposa County, California. It is located on the south bank of the Merced River and on the Yosemite Valley Railroad 4 miles (6.4 km) west-southwest of El Portal, at an elevation of 1519 feet (463 m).

A post office operated at Incline from 1924 to 1953. The community named after the lumber incline near the original town site.
