= Monte Wolfe =

American outlaw

Monte Wolfe Lone Wolf of the Sierra
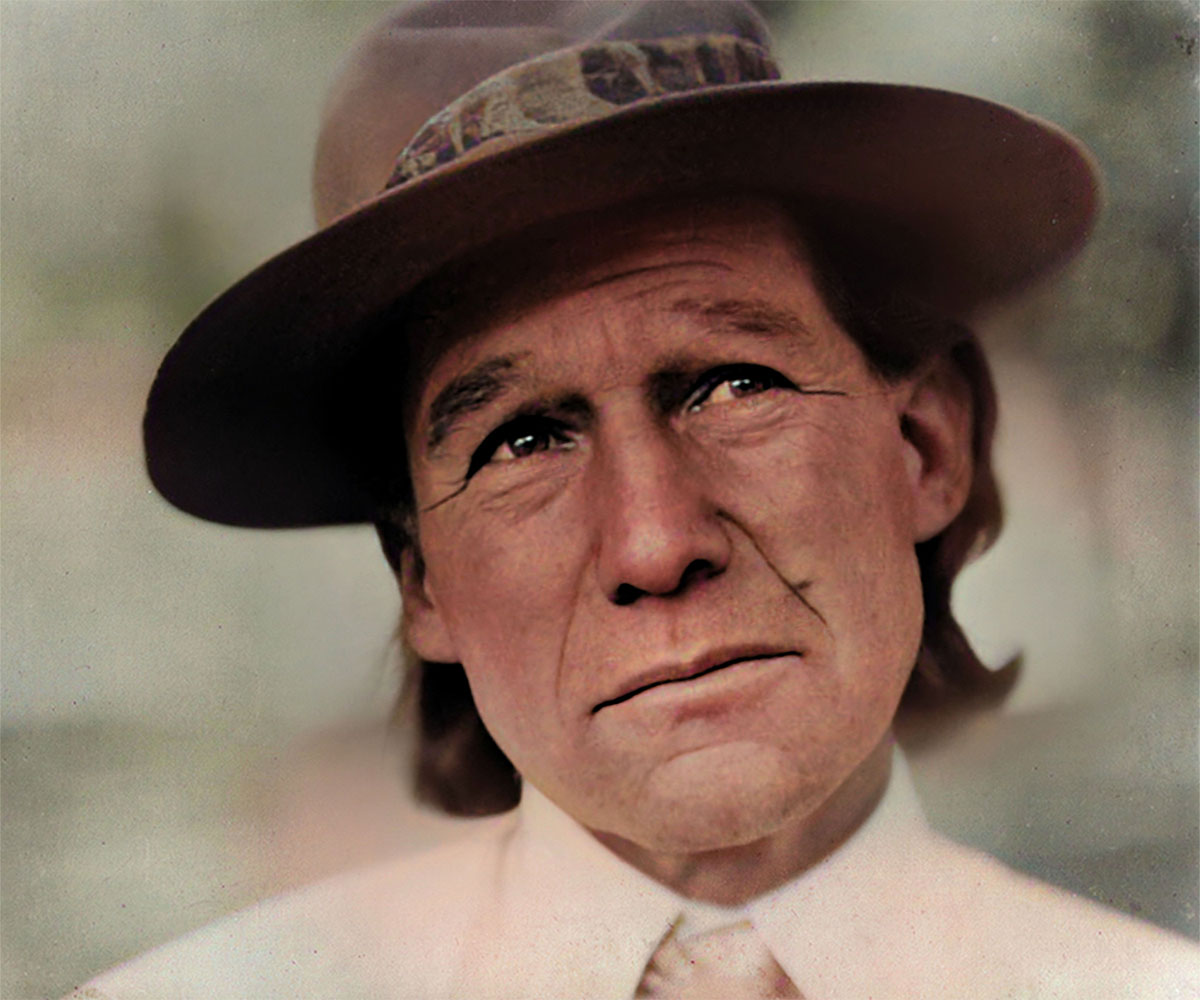
- Photo: Linford Collection
- Born: Archie Edwin Wright; April 20, 1886; Knife River Indian Villages National Historic Site
- Died: After March 7, 1940; Disappeared, Mokelumne Wilderness
- Burial place: Remains not recovered
- Education: 12 years, + U.S. Aviator and Naval Training
- Occupations: Pioneer Aviator, Sailor, Cowboy, Miner, notorious Mountain Guide
- Years active: 1886 - 1940
- Known for: Colloquial association as “The Last Mountain Man of the Sierra Nevada”
- Spouse: Goldie Faye Coolidge
- Children: Goldie Ina Wright, Edwin Richard Wright, Glenn Roland Wright:, and Norman Wright
- Relatives: Thomas Wright, father Edna Cay, mother

Monte Wolfe (April 20, 1886 – c. March 7, 1940), born Archie Edwin Wright on the lands of the Mandan, Hidatsa, and Arikara Nations. During his lifetime he used the aliases Lone Wolf, Archie Arlingtone, E.D. McGrath, U.S. Forest Service Ranger Gorham, and his preferred alias, Monte Wolfe.

His early life was characterized by repeated family homestead migrations to the Minnesota and Dakota Territories, then on to California, and Washington state. At each homestead location, the family built log cabins and barns, dug wells, and planted wheat and other crops.

White was a post-Spanish–American War aviator, aeroplane mechanic, and sailor with the Great White Fleet. He was also a teamster, a prospector and miner for gold and coal, and winter fur trapper with a trap line that ran from Northern Yosemite to Lake Tahoe.

In his later years, he became widely known as a notorious nighttime campsite “visitor”.

He was a skilled builder of log structures like barns, cabins, and out-structures and he worked alone. His log cabin survives, deep in the Mokelumne Wilderness to this day.

== Navy career ==
Archie Edwin Wright was born on April 20, 1886, in the Dakota Territory. In 1900, when he was 13 years old, his family migrated west by covered wagon along the Oregon Trail, crossing into California over the treacherous Donner Pass, settling in California's northlands to grow olives in Corning, California. After two years, the family had saved enough to sell the Corning homestead and purchase a section of land and farm in Washington state's Palouse region to grow wheat.

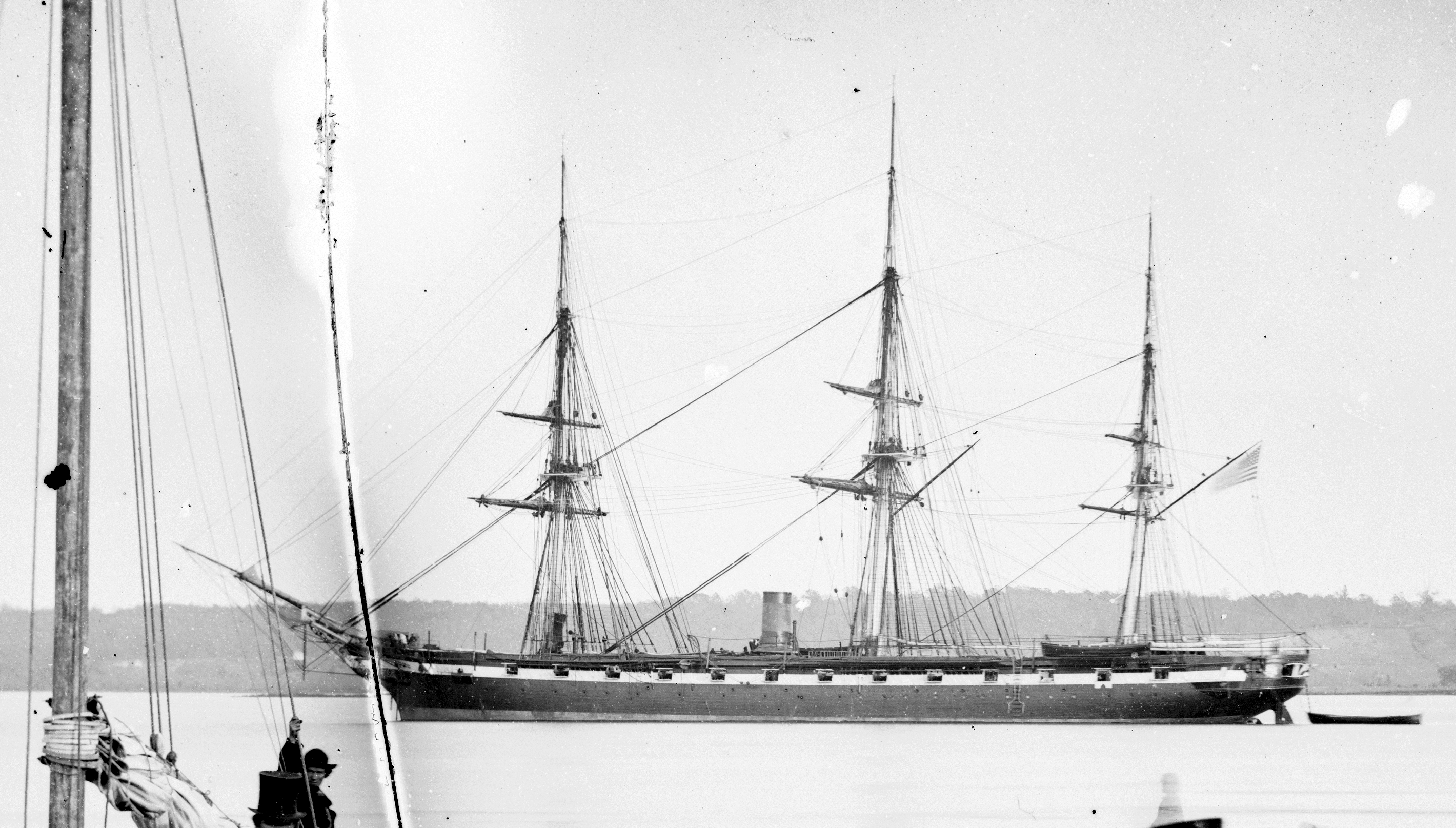
USS Pensacola (1859)

In 1907, when he was 21, it was time for him to leave the farm. He joined the U.S. Navy and was assigned to the wooden sailing ship USS Pensacola (1859) for training in San Francisco Bay. The three-masted, single-screw steamer had been built by the Union during the American Civil War. Today, the USS Pensacola wreck rests, burnt, in the shallows of San Francisco Bay, near San Francisco International Airport.

After training, Archie's first duty assignment was aboard the USS California (ACR-6), a first-generation armored cruiser, with which he cruised the Pacific Ocean with the Great White Fleet. While the entire fleet was anchored in San Francisco Bay for a naval review, there was an incident aboard the USS California. The USS California was to receive their ceremonial silver service by California's governor, the secretary of defense, and the Great White Fleet’s commanding officer, Admiral Uriel Sebree, the commander-in-chief of the Pacific Fleet.

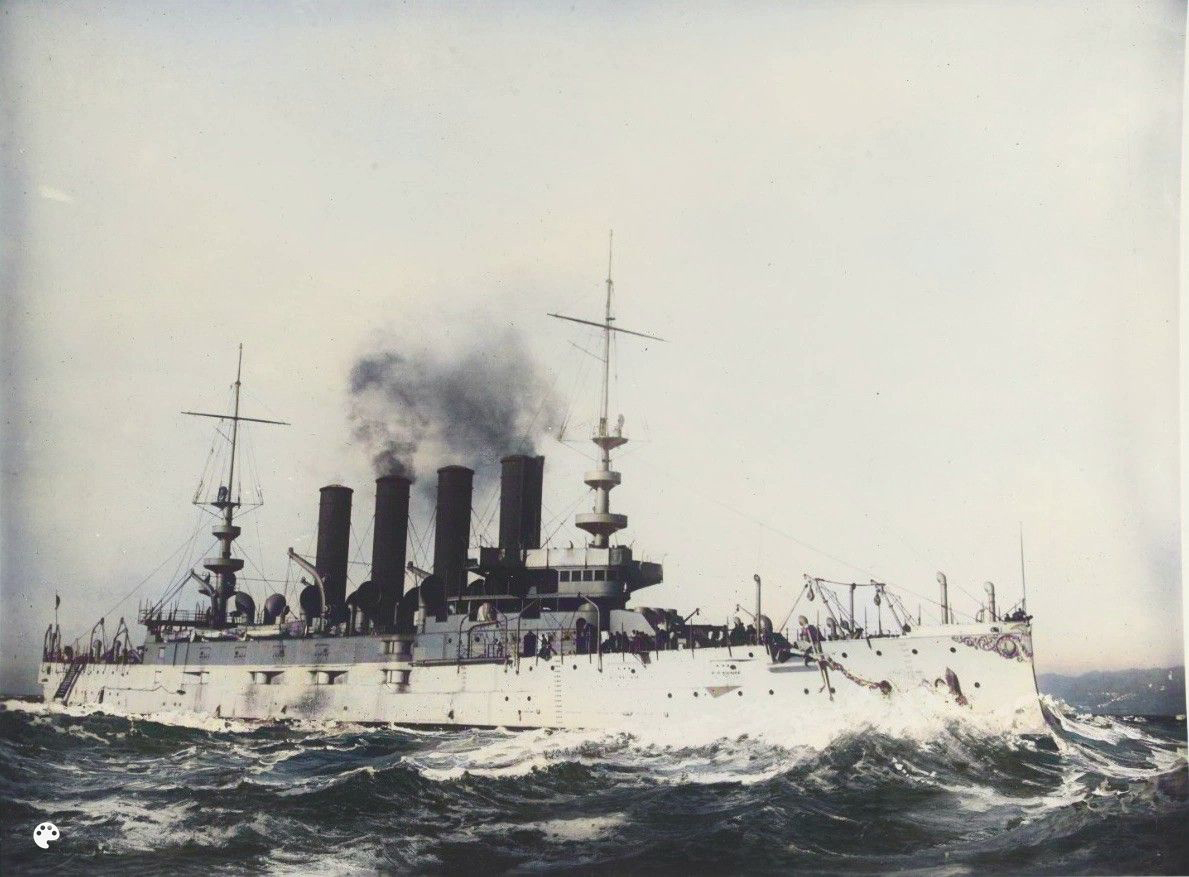
USS California (ACR-6)

According to the logbook of the USS California, Archie was disciplined three times during their stay in the bay. The first offense was using foul language in the presence of civilian visitors, the next two offenses were reparation for his obstinance. After his third stay in the USS California's brig, he decided to walk. While docked in Vallejo Junction on San Francisco Bay awaiting access to the Mare Island Naval Shipyard, he gathered his uniforms and disposed of them, then in the early morning hours of June 16, 1908 he walked off the ship and traveled east, and inland. After that event, his fear of naval reprisal colored his decisions, and stayed with him for the rest of his life.

== Period of homelessness in Modesto ==
He spent the ensuing six months living the life of a 21-year-old hobo on the run, looking for work; riding the rails and sleeping wherever he laid his head. In early 1908, he found himself in Modesto, California. He had met the love of his life, Goldie Faye Coolidge, a local farmer's daughter and relative of future President Calvin Coolidge.

== Arrested in Stanislaus County ==
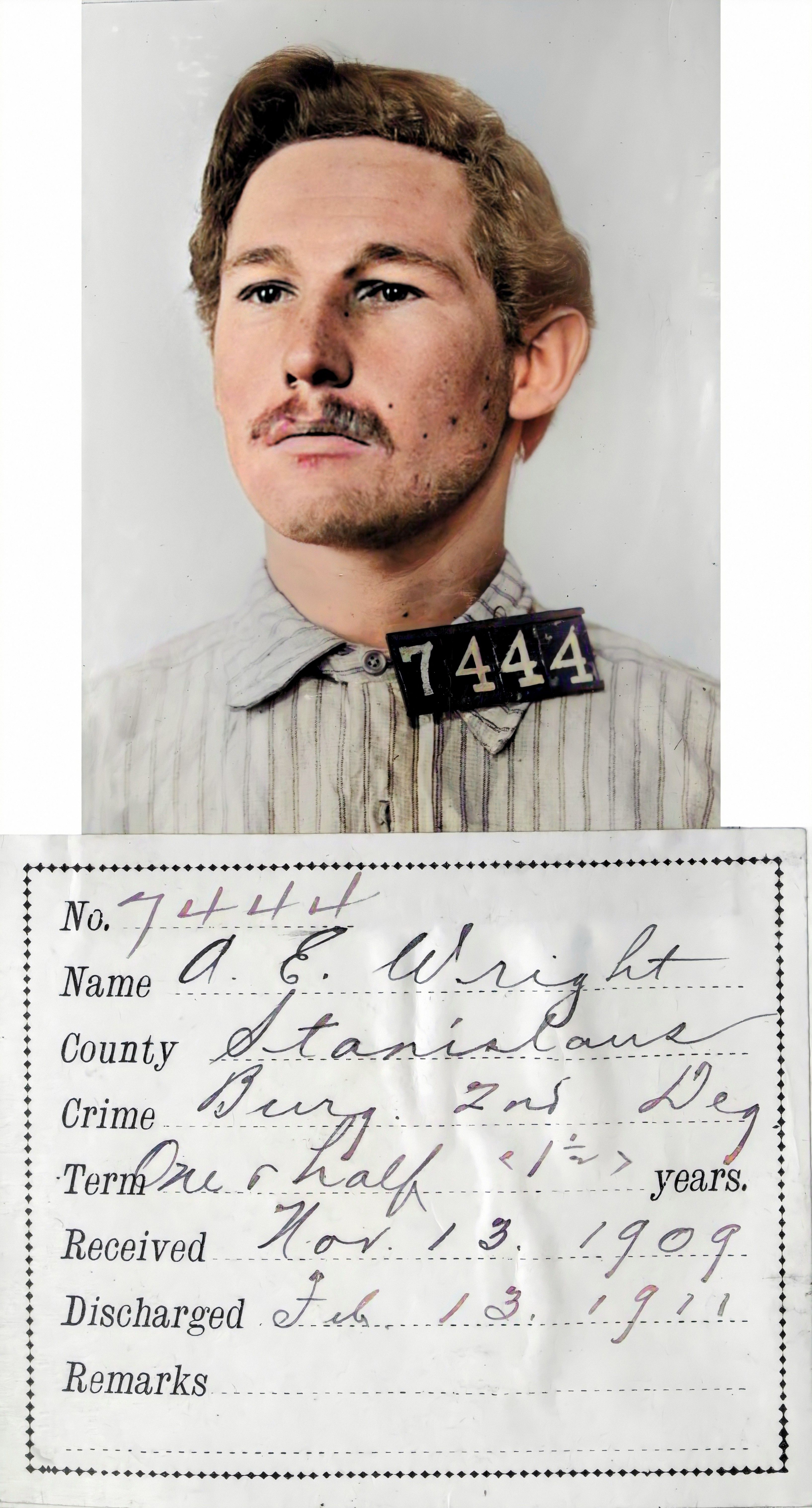
Stuck in Folsom State Prison

After illegally entering a vacated farmhouse in Stanislaus County and absconding with canned food and used clothing, he was tracked down, arrested, tried, and convicted of second-degree burglary, his first offense.

He was sentenced by the Stanislaus County Superior Court to 18 months hard labor at the notorious Folsom State Prison under an “old law” mandating stiff sentences for first-time offenders. Expecting a slap on the wrist, he was dumbfounded when he received his sentence. He spent the next 18 months hammering granite in the prison quarry, and ruminating about his ‘unfair’ treatment just when his life was beginning to improve.

== Marriage and family ==
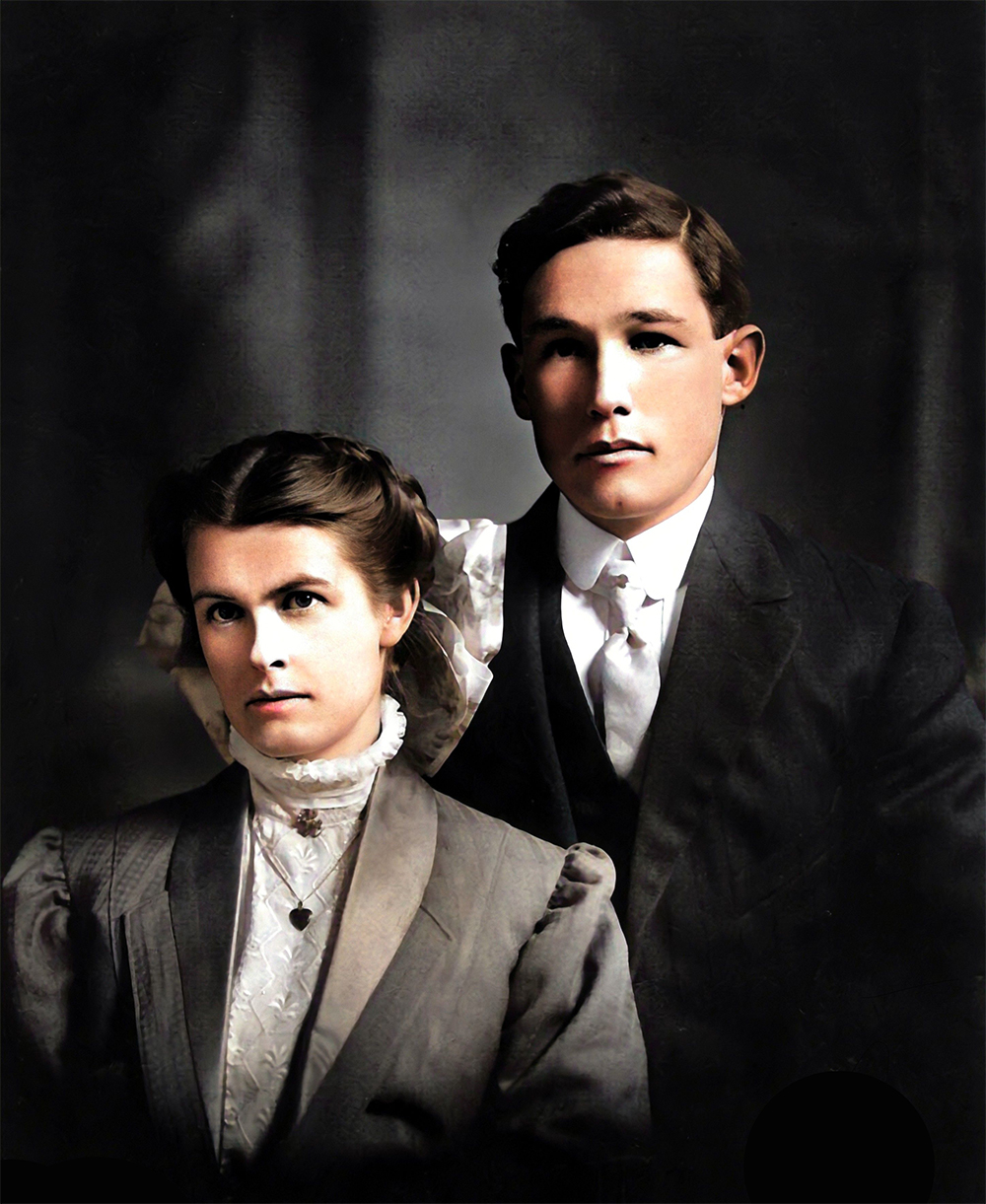
Archie and Goldie Faye wed

On the day of Archie's release from prison, he immediately boarded a train to Spokane and the Palouse in Washington state. Goldie Faye awaited there and they were immediately married. The infants started nine months later, and Goldie bore four, in four years; Goldie Ina, Edwin, Glenn, and Norman.

Archie found work as a clerk in Modesto, California, but with six mouths to feed, he needed a higher-paying job. He later landed a job as a lumberjack at the Westside Lumber Company, and later as a timberman and mucker in the Eagle Shawmut Mine near Tuolumne City, California. Goldie took a job as camp cook at the Westside Lumber Company.

== The 2nd Aero Squadron ==
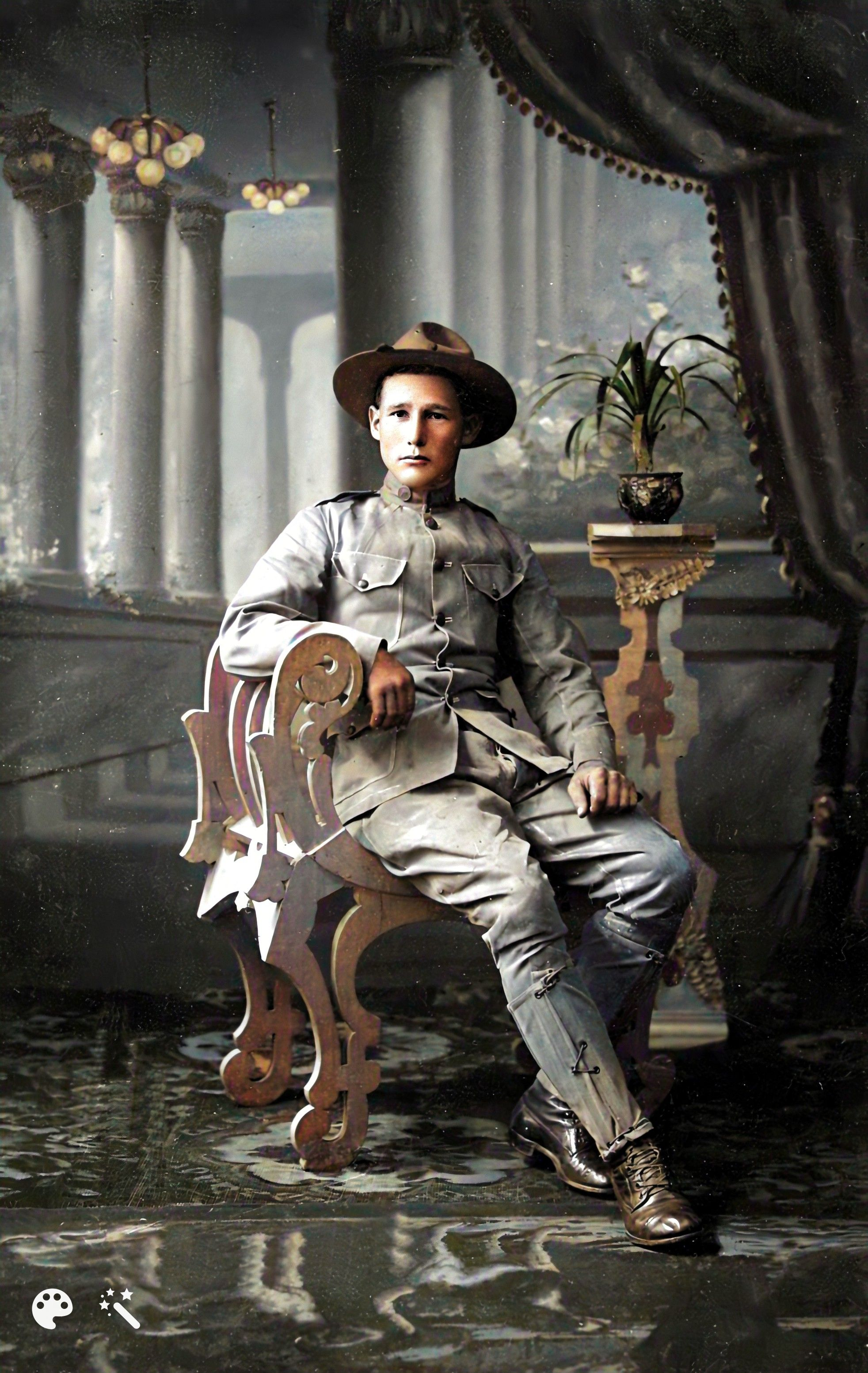
Private Archie Wright

In 1916, a rift opened between Goldie Faye and Archie; the cause is lost to time. Archie collected his last paycheck at the mine, traveled to San Francisco, and joined the U.S. Army. He was immediately shipped to Fort Mills on Corregidor in the Philippines and assigned to the 2nd Aero Squadron in the Harbor Defenses of Manila and Subic Bays. Letters sent home to Goldie Faye with paychecks indicate that Archie dearly missed his children and Goldie.

The Aviation Section, U.S. Signal Corps, activated the Second Aero Squadron on 12 May 1915. It was the second to be organized in the United States Army, as noted by its numerical designation. It was organized at Rockwell Field, San Diego, California, where the only aviation school at that time was located, and it was from this school that most of its squadron members came from. Other members were taken from the 1st Aero Squadron, which was the only completely equipped squadron in the Army.

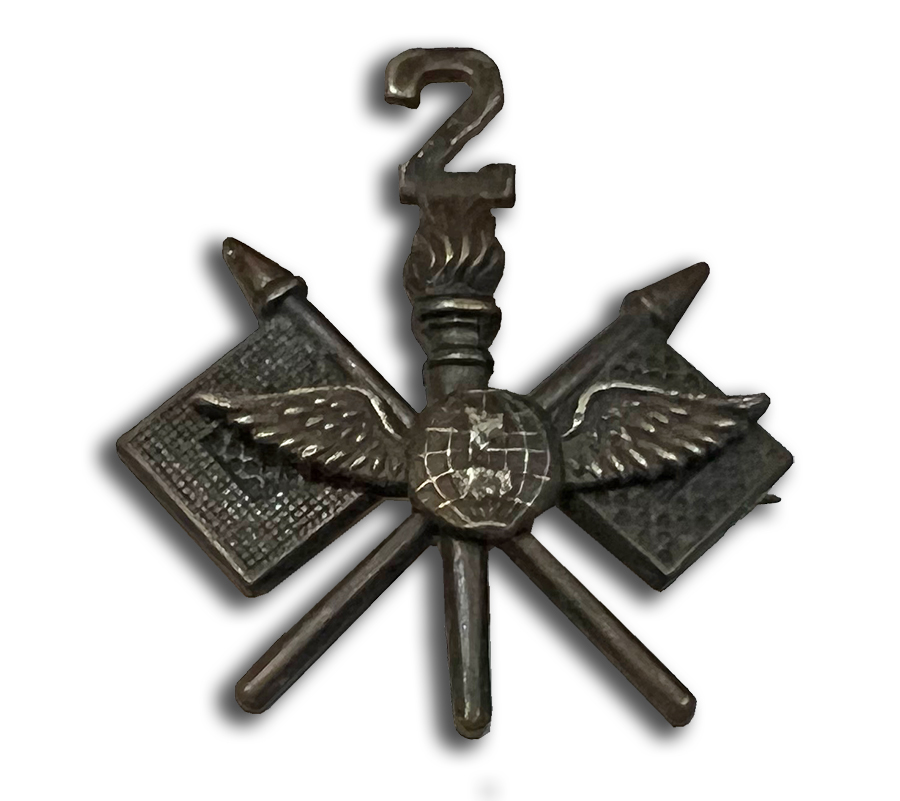
2nd Aero Squadron Flight Pin, 1916

It was the policy of the aviation school to completely train and equip a squadron before sending it into the field. The squadron consisted of six flying officers and thirty-nine enlisted men, primarily mechanics. Two officers and ten men were transferred from the 1st Aero Squadron. The USAT Sheridan sailed from San Francisco for Manila on 5 January 1916 with the squadron. After two weeks of quarantine, the unit reached its station on Corregidor on 14 February without aircraft. It was the first complete aviation unit assigned outside of the United States.

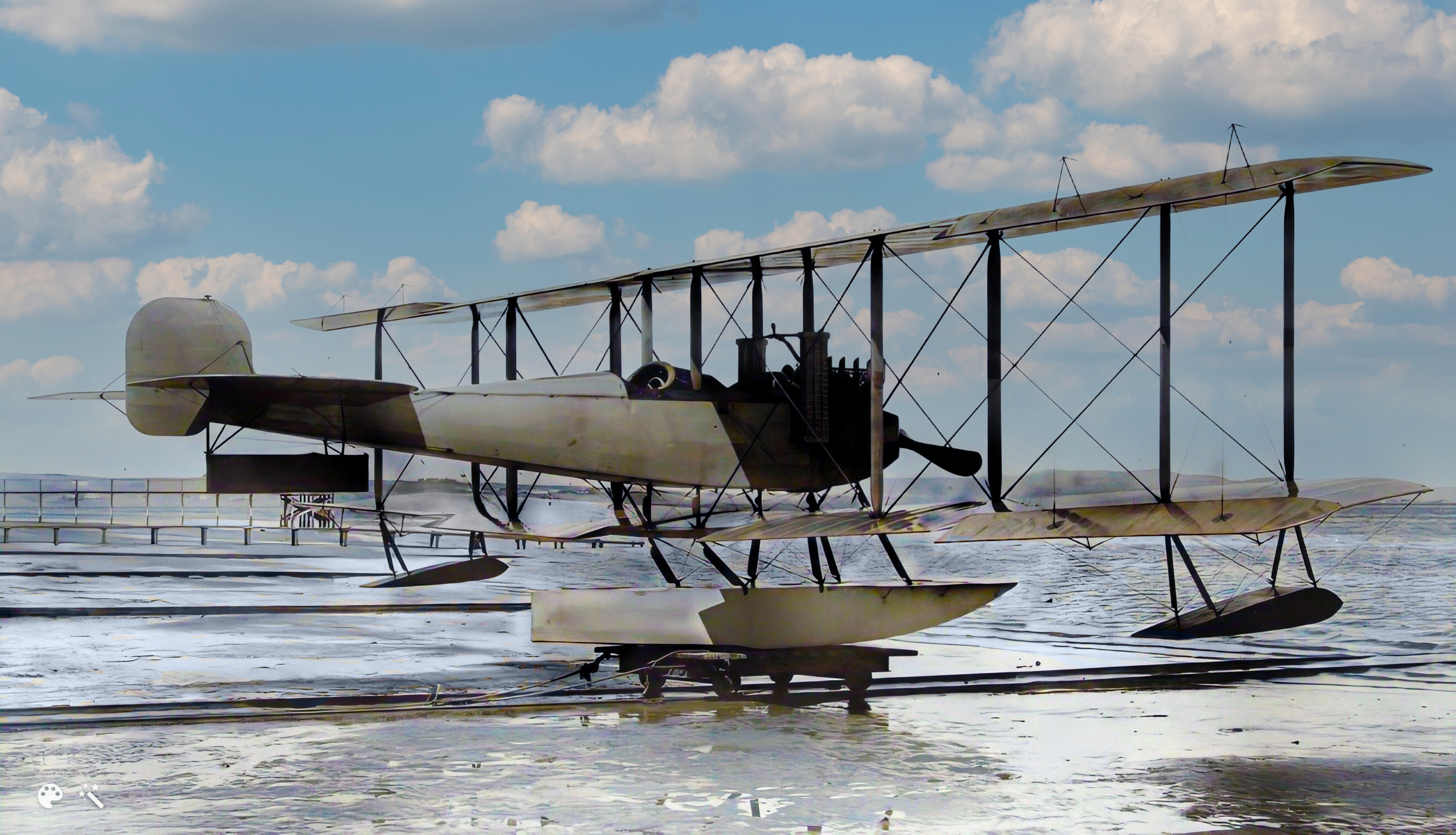
Martin S-Hydro

The 2nd received four Martin S-Hydro seaplanes (Signal Corps numbers 56–59) on 13 March and 15 April, and began flying on 8 May 1916. For the first time ever, an aeroplane was equipped with experimental radio transmitter, giving the aircraft a broadcast range of 29 miles. On 28 June, the company provided artillery spotting and adjustment, another first, for target practice with the Fort Mills batteries. Personnel for a second company were assembled and the unit was re-designated the 1st Company, 2nd Aero Squadron on 20 July 1917. The 2nd Company, 2nd Aero Squadron received two Wright Brothers aeroplanes and was based, in Hawaii.

As the U.S. entry into World War 1 approached, the 2nd Aero Squadron was redeployed to Kelly Field in San Antonio, TX. The voyage was to originate in Manila, with stopovers in Guam and Hawaii before arriving in San Francisco, CA. The following morning, the airmen boarded a train and began their final leg to Kelly Field. Archie never made it to the train. He had to go home to Goldie and his kids in Modesto.

But... he was too late. In desperation for her family, Goldie had met another man and subsequently became pregnant in 1918.

Goldie soon moved with the, now five children to Sacramento. Archie retreated to the Sierra Nevada mountains where he would spend the rest of is life, alone. Initially, he found work as a cowboy and prospector. Upon the arrival of the World War 1 draft, Wright registered as "Monte Wolfe, Prospector”

== Retreat from society ==
In the Sierra, Wolfe worked a number of jobs to earn the income he needed, including trapping, prospecting, and working as a fishing and hunting guide. At this point, he had not yet withdrawn from wider society altogether. That would change in 1927, when Wolfe had another run-in with law enforcement – he was arrested for felony burglary and spent 75 days awaiting trial in a Tuolumne County jail. In his trial that took place after this delay, the jury found Wolfe not guilty; however, upon acquittal, the county sheriff drove him to the city of Angels Camp in nearby Calaveras County, "unceremoniously dumped" him there, and told him to never again set foot in Tuolumne County.

According to historian Eric Jung, a Bear Valley businessman, historian, and author, this series of events made Wolfe "finally decide 'I've had enough of people'". For the rest of his life he would live off the land in a rugged area deep in the Sierra's Mokelumne River forests.

== Life in the Sierra ==
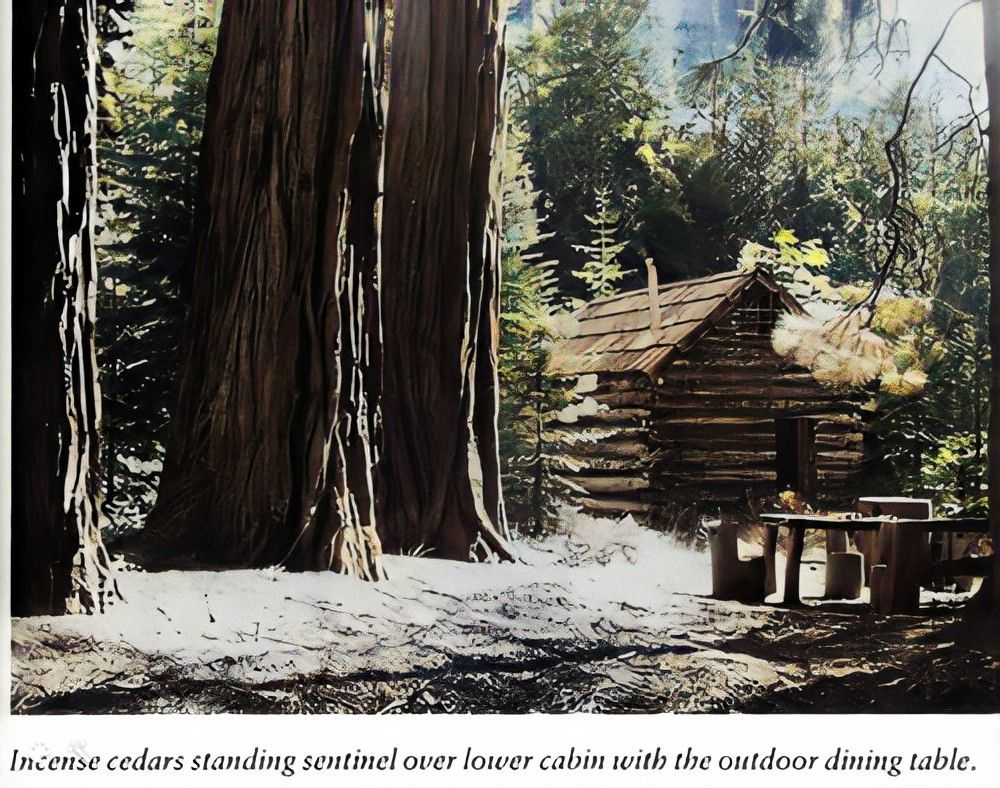
Monte Wolfe Lower Cabin

In the canyon of the Mokelumne River, Wolfe built himself two log cabins, where he lived for the rest of his life. Friends came to visit from time to time, and he occasionally ventured into the general store and bars along the highway about ten miles away. Aside from that, he lived as a hermit, and was entirely self-sufficient.

== Disappearance ==
One day late in the spring of 1940, three of Wolfe's friends – the brothers Art, Harry, and Reuben Schimke – set out to visit Wolfe in his cabin. Upon their arrival, they found the cabin empty, and could not find Wolfe. The last date crossed off on his calendar had been April 20 – his birthday – of that same year. It is unknown what caused Wolfe's disappearance and presumed death, but the surviving Schimke brothers believe it was unintentional. Wolfe had been suffering from some chronic health problems, which could have made him more likely to fall victim to an accident.

== Cabin preservation dispute ==
Monte Wolfe's first cabin was destroyed by Forest Service workers sometime before 2009. His second cabin remains standing to this day. This cabin, one of the last surviving pioneer structures in California built by one person entirely by hand, has become embroiled in a dispute between wilderness protection and historic preservation
After passage of the Wilderness Act of 1964, the ground upon which the cabin sits became part of the newly designated Mokelumne Wilderness. Wilderness area regulations generally prohibit the maintenance or construction of any buildings or structures not necessary to patrolling and maintaining the wilderness itself. As a result, rangers have at times sought to speed up the natural decay of the cabin, while preservationists have attempted to maintain it. The two groups at one point reached an agreement to leave the cabin as is in a state of "arrested decay", but both sides have accused the other side of violating this agreement.
