= Maiocco =

Maiocco is a surname. Notable people with the surname include:

- Hugo Maiocco (1927–2017), American sprinter
- Luigi Maiocco (1892–1965), Italian gymnast
- Matt Maiocco (born 1967), American sportswriter
- Pia Maiocco (born 1962), American bass guitarist and singer
