= Jeff Stover =

American football player (born 1958)

No. 72
- Positions: Defensive end, defensive tackle

Personal information
- Born: May 22, 1958 (age 68); Corning, California, U.S.
- Listed height: 6 ft 5 in (1.96 m)
- Listed weight: 275 lb (125 kg)

Career information
- High school: Corning (CA)
- College: Oregon
- NFL draft: 1982: undrafted

Career history
- San Francisco 49ers (1982–1989)

Awards and highlights
- 3× Super Bowl champion (XIX, XXIII, XXIV)

Career NFL statistics
- Sacks: 30.5
- Fumble recoveries: 3
- Stats at Pro Football Reference

Jeffrey Owen Stover (born May 22, 1958) is an American former professional football player. He was a defensive lineman for the San Francisco 49ers of the National Football League (NFL).

== History ==
Stover finished in third place in the NCAA shot put competition in 1979. In 1980, while attending the University of Oregon, he was named Pac-10 champion shot putter. With record-breaking statistics, Stover made it to the 1980 Olympic trials. However, as a result of the 1980 Summer Olympics boycott by the United States (held that year in Moscow), he never had the opportunity to compete.

Stover had a great eagerness to play professional football, and earned a tryout with the San Francisco 49ers shortly after they won Super Bowl XVI. He was signed by the 49ers, but played sparingly during his first few seasons. In 1984, he was named the team's starting left end, but a knee injury during the first regular season match against the Detroit Lions caused him to miss several games. In 1985, he finally played a full, healthy season in a starting role, and registered 10 sacks. In 1986, in 15 games, he registered 11 sacks.

He is one of only seven 49ers defensive linemen (along with Dwaine Board, Charles Haley, Dana Stubblefield, Chris Doleman, Roy Barker, and Bryant Young) to register 10 or more sacks more than once during their tenure with the team since the statistic started being recorded in 1982.

Stover remained a free agent through all of training camp and preseason in 1987 (in the midst of talk of a possible strike by the players), but signed before the season began. However, this proved to be a turning point in his career, as he in poor physical condition and posted only 3.5 sacks. In 1988, he failed to register even half a sack for the first time in his career, but still was able to play in the Super Bowl against the Cincinnati Bengals. He retired following the season and now owns the Chico Sports Club in Chico, California. He became interested in medicine and rehabilitation largely because he was plagued by injuries in his own career.

== Playing style ==
He was capable of simply overpowering opposing linemen. He could play defensive end in the 3-4 and defensive tackle in the 4–3, and regardless of where he played, he would simply try to run over his opponents rather than beat them with speed. In 1984, Bill Walsh called him his "most consistent defensive player."

== Other sources ==
- Jeff Stover's Football Reference
