= Corning, California =

City in California, United States

- City
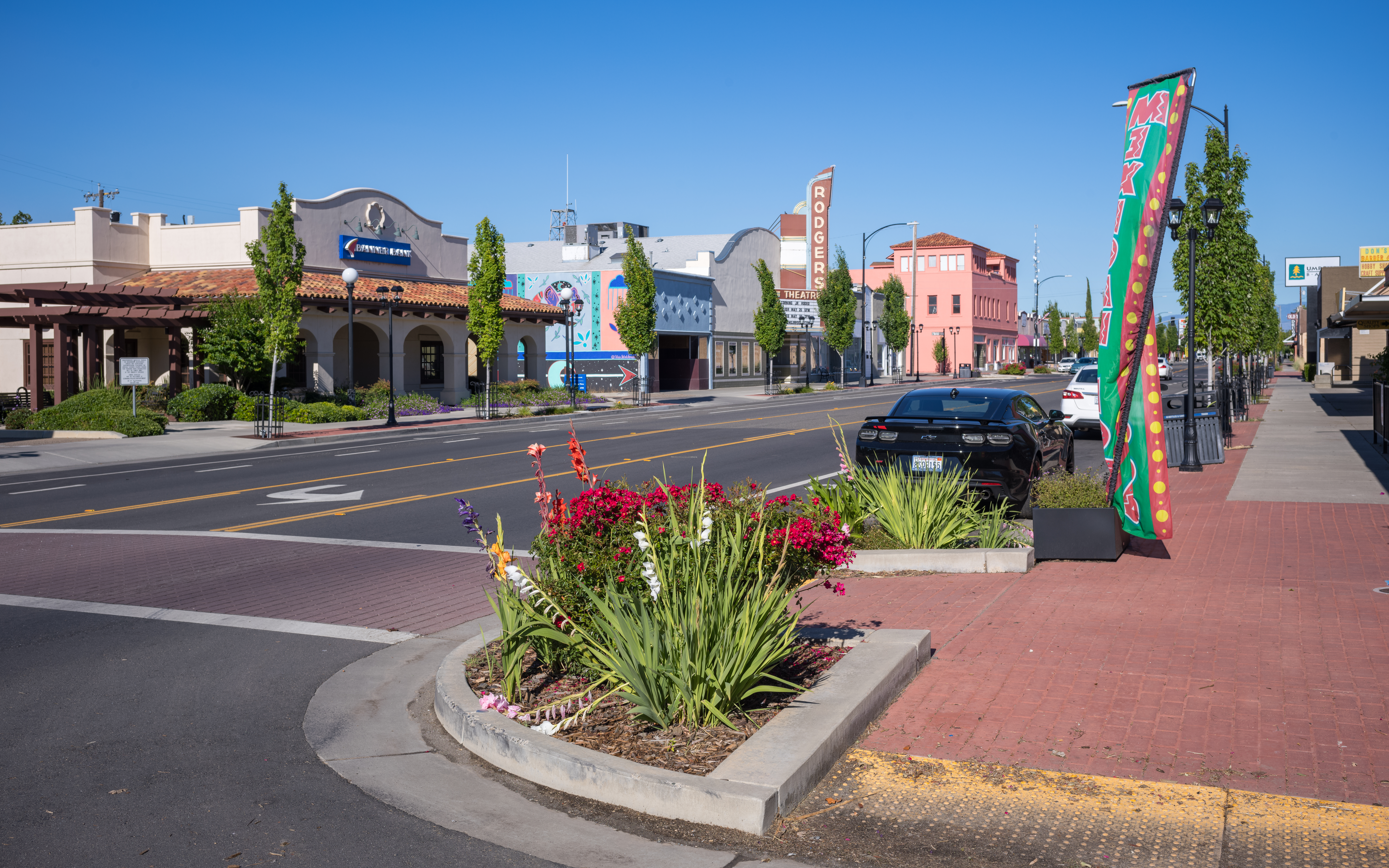
- Solano Street in 2023

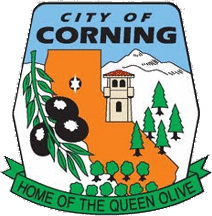
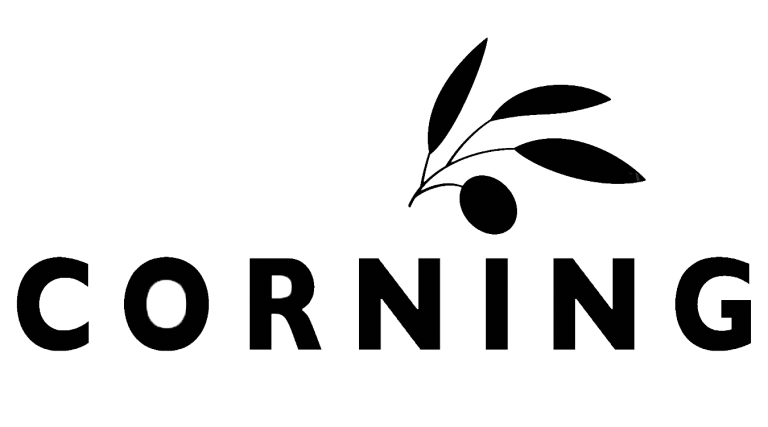
- Seal Logo
- Nickname: "The Olive City"
- Interactive map of Corning, California
- Location in the United States
- Coordinates: 39°55′34″N 122°10′50″W
- Country: United States
- State: California
- County: Tehama
- Incorporated: August 6, 1907

Area
  - Total: 3.55 sq mi (9.19 km^{2})
  - Land: 3.55 sq mi (9.19 km^{2})
  - Water: 0 sq mi (0.00 km^{2}) 0%
- Elevation: 276 ft (84 m)

Population (2020)
  - Total: 8,244
  - Density: 2,324.2/sq mi (897.37/km^{2})
- Time zone: UTC−8 (Pacific (PST))
  - Summer (DST): UTC−7 (PDT)
- ZIP codes: 96021, 96029, (96092)
- Area codes: 530, 837
- FIPS code: 06-16322
- GNIS feature ID: 0277491
- Website: corning.org

Corning is a city in Tehama County, California, United States that is located approximately 19 miles (31 km) south of Red Bluff and about 100 miles (160 km) north of Sacramento. The population was 8,244 at the 2020 census, up from 7,663 at the 2010 census.

== History ==
Corning had its start in 1882, when the railroad was extended to that point. The community was named after John Corning, a railroad official.

== Geography ==
Corning is located at 39°55′34″N 122°10′50″W (39.926182, -122.180489).

According to the United States Census Bureau, the city has a total area of 3.55 square miles (9.2 km^{2}), all land.

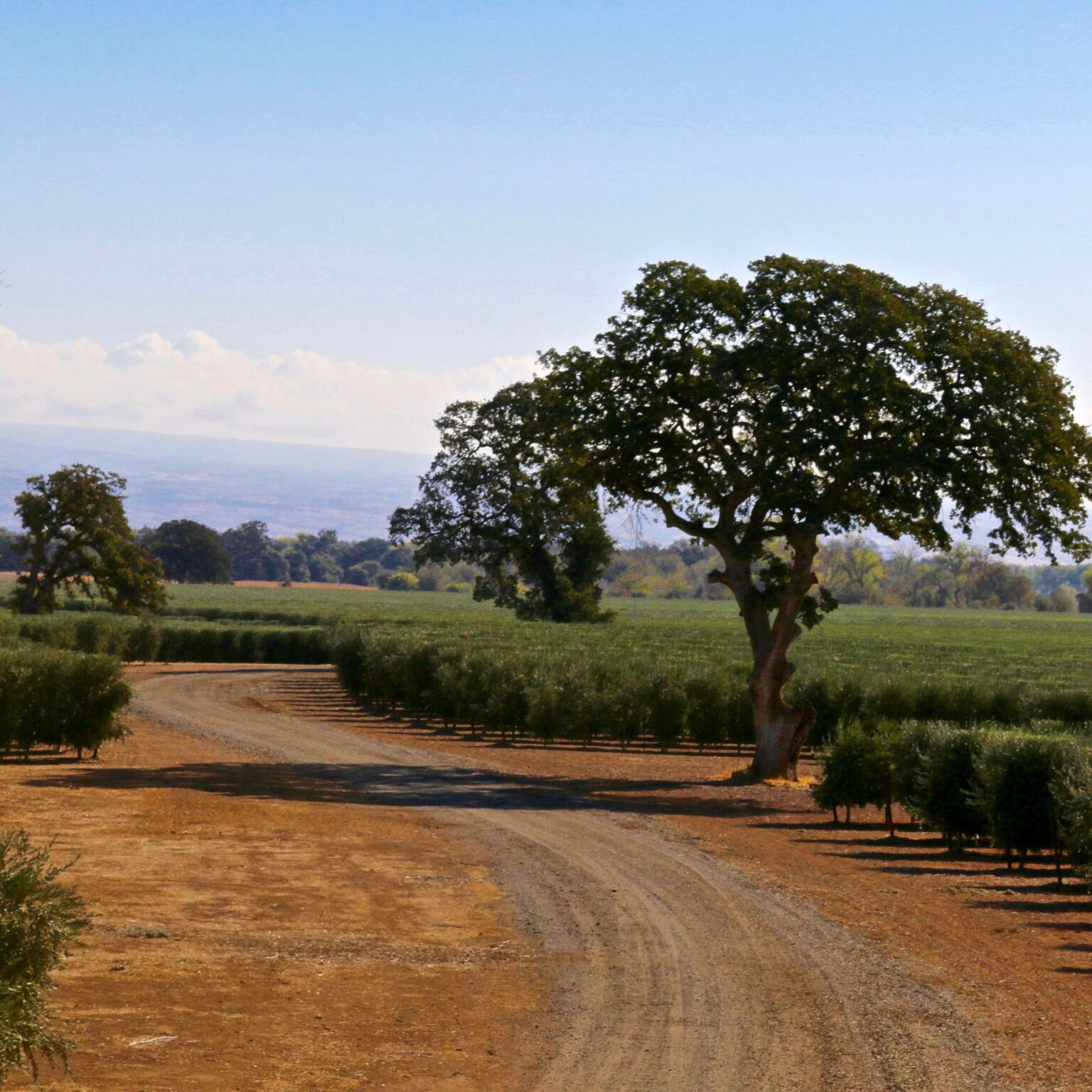
High-density Arbequina olive orchard in Corning

=== Climate ===
According to the Köppen Climate Classification system, Corning has a Hot-summer Mediterranean climate, abbreviated "Csa" on climate maps.

== Demographics ==
Historical population
Census	Pop.	Note	%±
1890	210		—
1910	972		—
1920	1,449		49.1%
1930	1,377		−5.0%
1940	1,472		6.9%
1950	2,537		72.4%
1960	3,006		18.5%
1970	3,573		18.9%
1980	4,745		32.8%
1990	5,870		23.7%
2000	6,741		14.8%
2010	7,663		13.7%
2020	8,244		7.6%
U.S. Decennial Census

=== 2020 census ===
As of the 2020 census, Corning had a population of 8,244 and a population density of 2,324.2 inhabitants per square mile (897.4/km^{2}). The median age was 32.3 years. 30.3% of residents were under the age of 18, 9.4% were aged 18 to 24, 26.8% were aged 25 to 44, 21.2% were aged 45 to 64, and 12.4% were 65 years of age or older. For every 100 females, there were 95.3 males, and for every 100 females age 18 and over, there were 91.9 males age 18 and over.

The census reported that 99.6% of the population lived in households, 0.4% lived in non-institutionalized group quarters, and no one was institutionalized. 99.3% of residents lived in urban areas, while 0.7% lived in rural areas.

There were 2,811 households in Corning, of which 43.8% had children under the age of 18 living in them. Of all households, 42.5% were married-couple households, 9.7% were cohabiting-couple households, 16.9% were households with a male householder and no spouse or partner present, and 30.9% were households with a female householder and no spouse or partner present. About 21.7% of all households were made up of individuals and 10.3% had someone living alone who was 65 years of age or older. The average household size was 2.92. There were 2,017 families (71.8% of all households).

There were 2,940 housing units at an average density of 828.9 units per square mile (320.0 units/km^{2}), of which 95.6% were occupied. Of occupied units, 48.7% were owner-occupied and 51.3% were occupied by renters. Of all housing units, 4.4% were vacant. The homeowner vacancy rate was 1.7% and the rental vacancy rate was 2.9%.

Racial composition as of the 2020 census
Race	Number	Percent
White	3,832	46.5%
Black or African American	23	0.3%
American Indian and Alaska Native	284	3.4%
Asian	117	1.4%
Native Hawaiian and Other Pacific Islander	19	0.2%
Some other race	2,787	33.8%
Two or more races	1,182	14.3%
Hispanic or Latino (of any race)	4,487	54.4%

=== Income and poverty ===
In 2023, the US Census Bureau estimated that the median household income was $55,732, and the per capita income was $20,892. About 10.0% of families and 13.7% of the population were below the poverty line. Of those aged 25 or older, 77.7% were high school graduates and 13.4% had a bachelor's degree.

=== 2010 census ===
At the 2010 census Corning had a population of 7,663 people. The population density was 2,158.8 people per square mile (833.5 people/km^{2}). The racial makeup of Corning was 5,510 (71.9%) Caucasian, 44 (0.6%) African American, 201 (2.6%) Native American, 82 (1.1%) Asian, 11 (0.1%) Pacific Islander, 1,496 (19.5%) from other races, and 319 (4.2%) from two or more races. Hispanic or Latino of any race were 3,271 individuals (42.7%).

The census reported that 7,638 people (99.7% of the population) lived in households, 19 (0.2%) lived in non-institutionalized group quarters, and 6 (0.1%) were institutionalized.

There were 2,630 households, out of which 1,193 (45.4%) had children under age 18 living in them, 1,136 (43.2%) were opposite-sex married couples living together, 533 (20.3%) had a female householder with no husband present, 179 (6.8%) had a male householder with no wife present. There were 224 (8.5%) unmarried opposite-sex partnerships, and 12 (0.5%) same-sex married couples or partnerships. 633 households (24.1%) were one person and 259 (9.8%) had someone living alone who was 65 years of age or older. The average household size was 2.90. There were 1,848 families (70.3% of households); the average family size was 3.44 persons.

The age distribution was 2,479 people (32.4%) under age 18, 864 people (11.3%) aged 18 to 24, 1,931 people (25.2%) aged 25 to 44, 1,617 people (21.1%) aged 45 to 64, and 772 people (10.1%) who were 65 years of age or older. The median age was 29.2 years. For every 100 females there were 94.5 males. For every 100 females aged 18 and over, there were 89.5 males.

There were 2,871 housing units at an average density of 808.8 units per square mile (312.3 units/km^{2}), of which 1,302 (49.5%) were owner-occupied, and 1,328 (50.5%) were occupied by renters. The homeowner vacancy rate was 3.1%; the rental vacancy rate was 8.4%. 3,765 people (49.1% of the population) lived in owner-occupied housing units and 3,873 people (50.5%) lived in rental housing units.

== Government ==
In the California State Legislature, Corning is in the 1st senatorial district, represented by Republican Megan Dahle, and in the 3rd Assembly district, represented by Vacant.

In the United States House of Representatives, Corning is in California's 1st congressional district, represented by Republican James Gallagher.

== Major industries ==
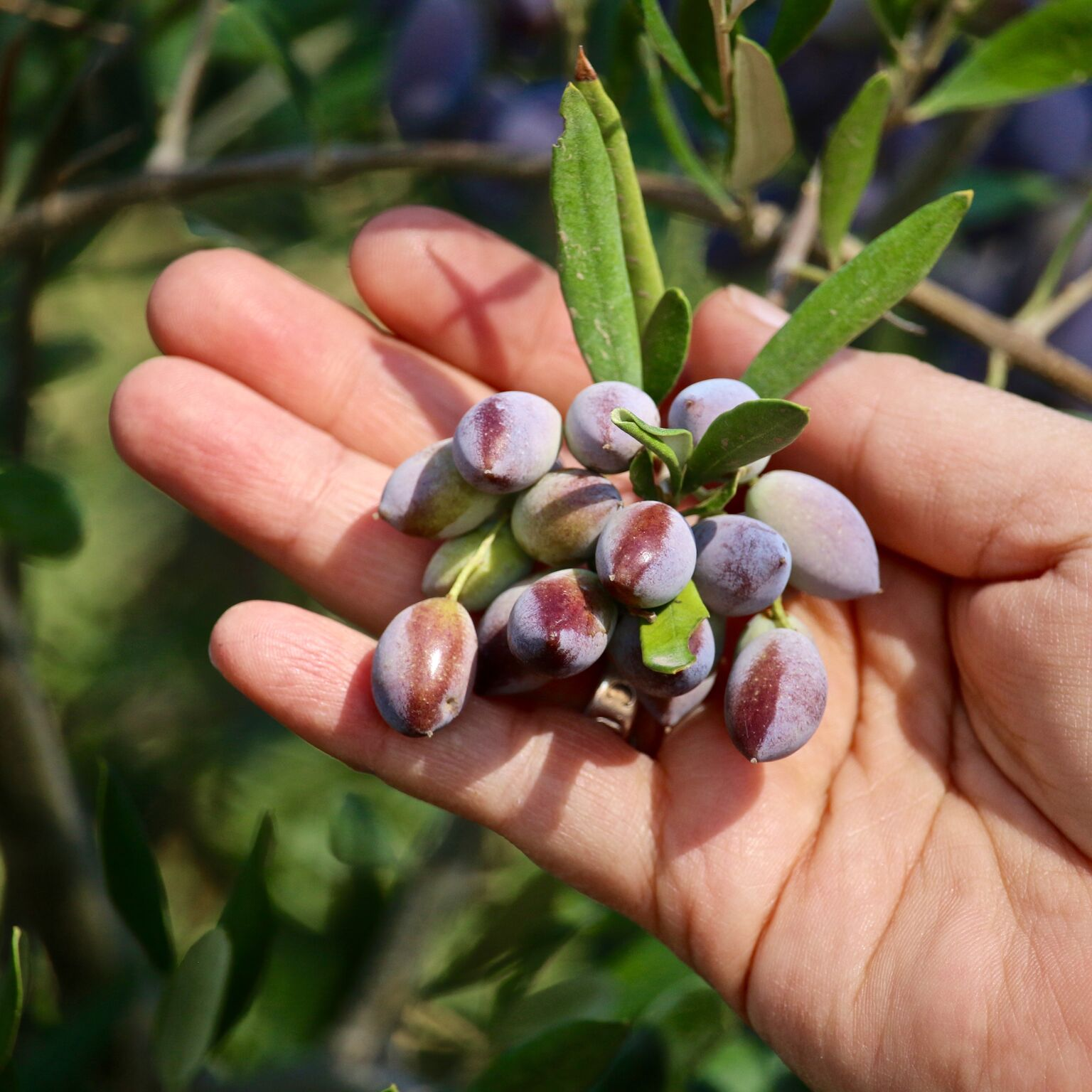
An olive grower shows Koroneiki olives ripe for harvest.

The major local industry is growing and preparing table olives. Corning also has a significant agricultural industry based on olive oil, dried plums (prunes, including the Sunsweet label), walnuts, and almonds.

Bell-Carter Foods

Corning is home to Bell-Carter Foods, Inc., the second-largest table olive processor in the world and the largest in the United States. Bell Carter produces Lindsay Olives.

== Corning Olive Festival ==
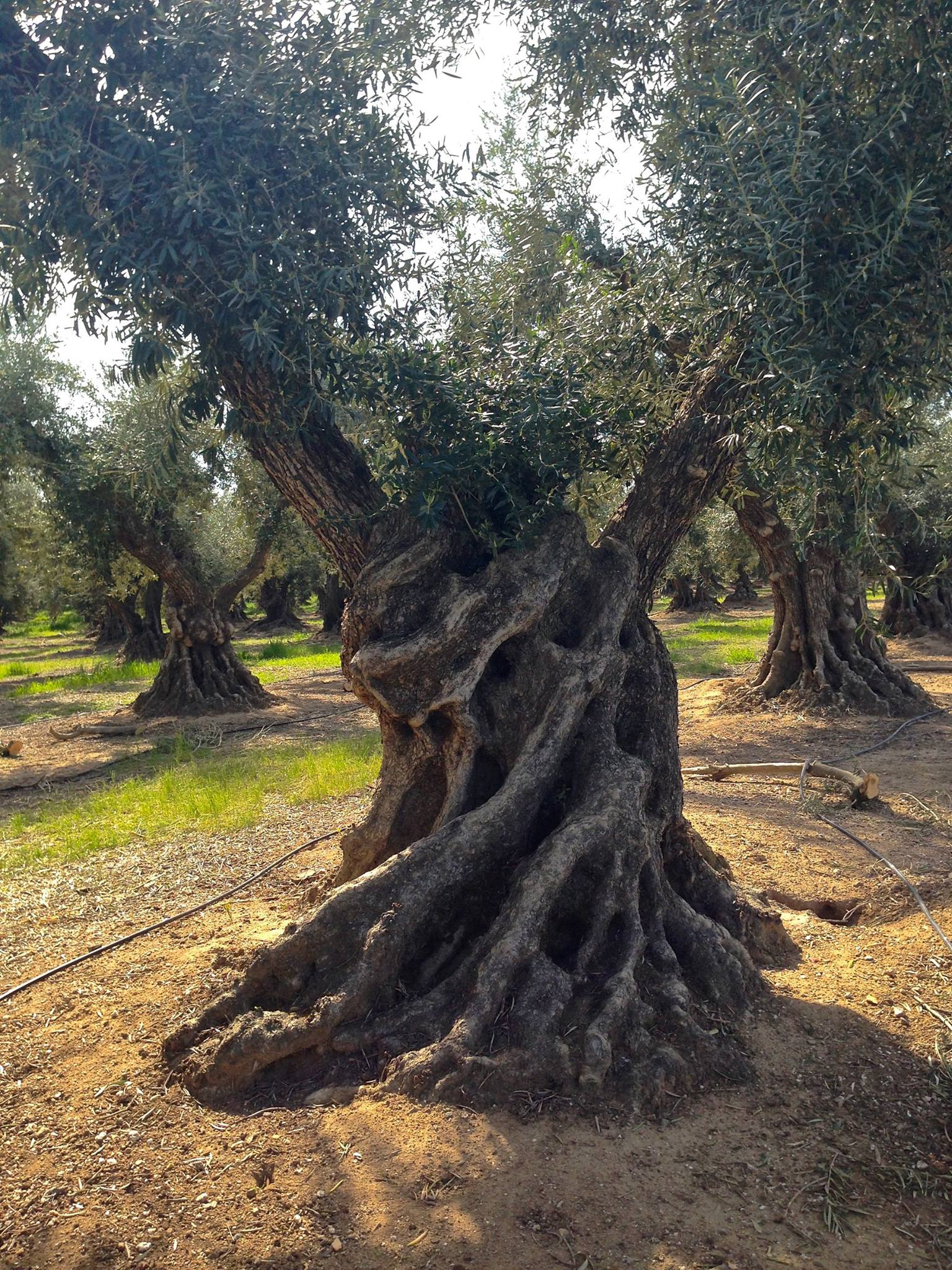
An old Sevillano olive tree in Corning, April 2015

The annual Corning Olive Festival, held on the second Saturday in October, is the longest-running olive festival in the United States. Started in 1946 by the local Catholic church as a fundraiser, the festival is now organized and operated by the Corning Chamber of Commerce.

== Transportation ==
Interstate 5 and Highway 99 both serve Corning, along with the California Northern Railroad. The California Northern has been leasing and operating the 110.7-mile (178.2 km) line between Davis and Tehama through Corning from Southern Pacific (now Union Pacific) since September 26, 1993. The line was built by Southern Pacific's subsidiary, the Northern Railway Company, in August / September 1882.

Corning Municipal Airport (0O4), a public-use facility, is located just to the north of the high school. Its runway (numbered 17 and 35) is 2,692 feet (821 m) long and sits 293 feet (89 m) above sea level. The airport was activated in 1940. Its area control center is Oakland Center, while its flight service station is Rancho Murieta.

== Notable people ==
=== Births ===
People born in Corning:

- Ralph Goings (1928–2016), artist
- Matt Maiocco (born 1967), sportswriter
- Tyler Reddick (born 1996), NASCAR driver
- Harry R. Stone (born 1942), MLB player
- Jeff Stover (born 1958), NFL player
- Blaire White (born 1993), YouTube personality

=== Inhabitants ===
People who live/lived in Corning at some point:

- Priscilla Duffield (1918–2009), secretary for Manhattan Project
- Keith Daniel Williams (1947–1996), triple murderer
- Monte Wolfe (1886–c.1940), pioneer

=== Deaths ===
People who died in Corning:

- Lee Grissom (1907–1998), Major League Baseball pitcher
- Silas M. Holmes (1816–1905), politician

=== Other ===
People associated with Corning in some other way:

- Clair Engle (1911–1964), U.S. Senator; practiced law in Corning
- France Silva (1876–1951), Marine; buried in Corning
