= Martin T =

1913 American military training biplane

Model T, Model TT
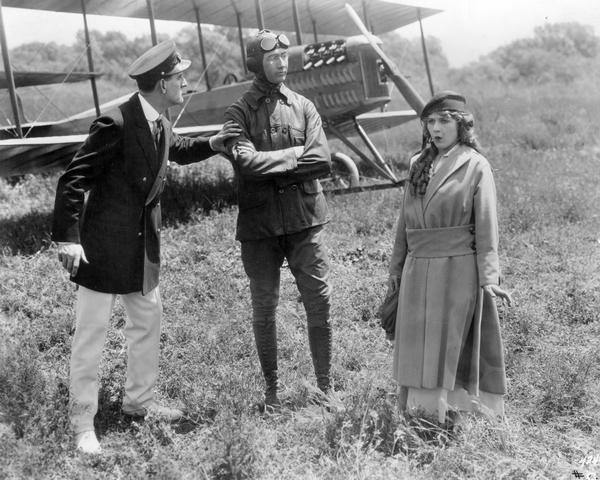

General information
- Type: Military trainer aircraft
- National origin: United States
- Manufacturer: Martin
- Designer: Charles F. Willard
- Primary user: United States Army
- Number built: 17

History
- First flight: 1913
- Variant: Martin S

The Martin T or TT was a training biplane produced in the United States in 1913 for military use. It was a conventional, three-bay biplane with unstaggered wings of equal span. The pilot and instructor sat in tandem, open cockpits with dual controls. Fixed, taildragger undercarriage was fitted, which could be exchanged for a single pontoon under the fuselage and wingtip floats.

Early examples were delivered to the Army without engines, so the Army could power them with engines salvaged from other aircraft, but later TTs came equipped with Curtiss, Hall-Scott, or Sturtevant engines.

In 1915, a Model TT was piloted by Oscar Brindley to win the Curtiss Marine Trophy for the longest flight within 10 consecutive hours in one day, covering 444 mi (710 km).

The Model T was the basis for the Martin S Hydro seaplane, with a lengthened fuselage, a greater span, and upper wing ailerons.

The first Martin T acquired, Signal Corps Number 31, was deployed to Texas in April 1915 as the Army massed around Brownsville in response to civil war in Mexico involving forces under Pancho Villa. On April 20, S.C. 31 became the first American military aircraft to be fired on by a hostile force. Although not hit by a machine gun firing at it from the Mexican side of the border, the returning pilot taxied it into a ditch and damaged it beyond repair.

== Variants ==
Martin T
Two-seat training biplane for the US Army, three built (S.C. 31-33)
Martin TT
Variant with Curtiss, Hall-Scott, or Sturtevant piston engines, 14 built (S.C. 37-38, 50-51, 54-55, 96-101, 330-331)

== Operators ==
- United States Army
  - Aeronautical Division, U.S. Signal Corps
  - Aviation Section, U.S. Signal Corps

== Specifications (TT) ==
Data from Holcomb

General characteristics

- Crew: two - pilot and instructor
- Length: 26 ft 4 in (8.01 m)
- Wingspan: 38 ft 8 in (11.79 m)
- Height: 9 ft 4 in (2.85 m)
- Wing area: 379 sq ft (35.2 m^{2})
- Empty weight: 1,320 lb (600 kg)
- Gross weight: 1,720 lb (780 kg)
- Powerplant: 1 × Curtiss OX-2 , 90 hp (67 kW)

Performance

- Maximum speed: 96 mph (152 km/h, 83 kn)
- Service ceiling: 9,500 ft (2,900 m)
