= 2nd Air Refueling Squadron =

US Air Force unit

2nd Air Refueling Squadron

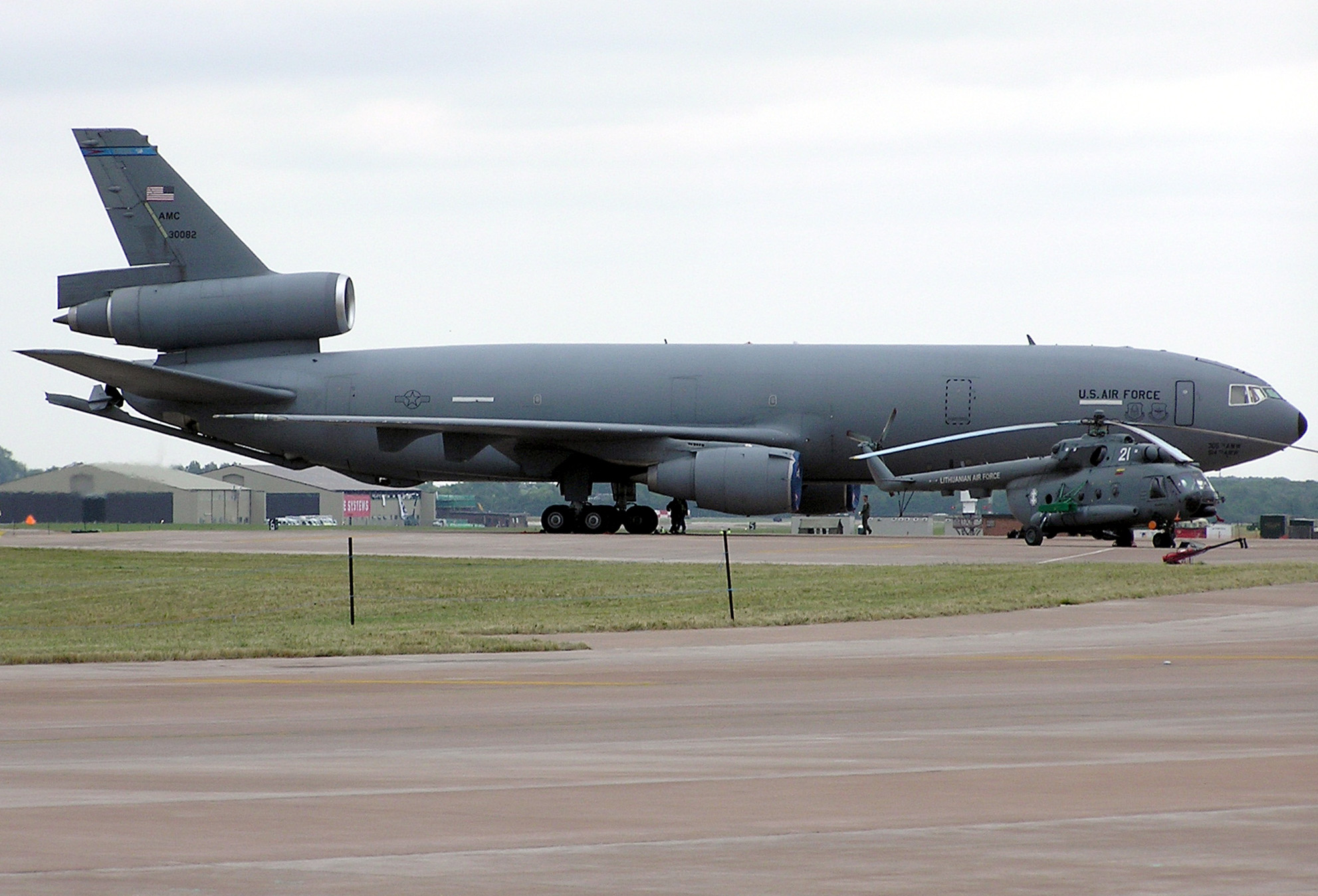
- 2nd Air Refueling Squadron KC-10 at RAF Fairford, England
- Active: 1915–1918; 1919–1946; 1949–1963; 1989–present
- Country: United States
- Branch: United States Air Force
- Role: Aerial refueling
- Part of: Air Mobility Command
- Garrison/HQ: McGuire Air Force Base
- Motto: Second to None (1989-present)
- Colors: Red and Black
- Engagements: World War II; Battle of the Philippines (1941–42); Southwest Asia
- Decorations: Distinguished Unit Citation; Air Force Outstanding Unit Award; Philippine Presidential Unit Citation

Commanders
- Current commander: Lt Col Terence Perkins

Insignia
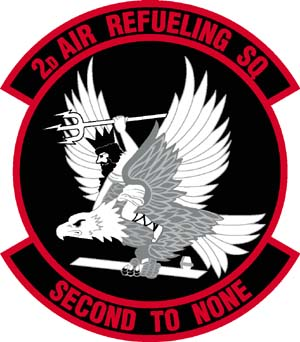
- 2nd Air Refueling Squadron emblem (Note: Approved 13 April 1995.)

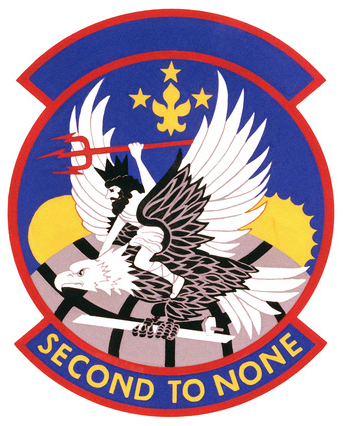
- 2nd Air Refueling Squadron emblem (Note: Approved 7 March 1989.)

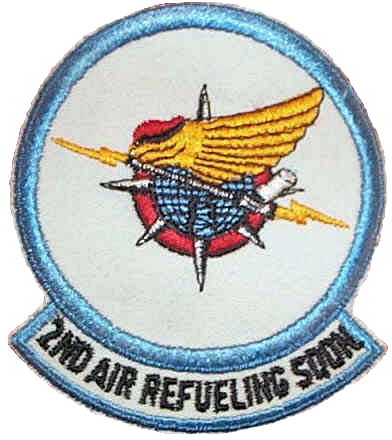
- 2nd Air Refueling Squadron emblem (Note: Approved 20 February 1952.)

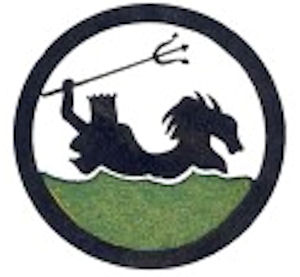
- 2nd Observation Squadron (Note: Approved 21 May 1924.)

The 2nd Air Refueling Squadron (Note: Officially, 2d Air Refueling Squadron.) is a unit of the United States Air Force. It is part of the 305th Air Mobility Wing at McGuire Air Force Base, part of Joint Base McGuire-Dix-Lakehurst, New Jersey. The 2nd Air Refueling Squadron is the second-oldest squadron in the Air Force, having over 100 years of service to the nation. It was deployed to the Philippines after World War I, during the 1941-1942 Battle of the Philippines, it was wiped out, with the Japanese forcing some of the personnel to endure the Bataan Death March. It was re-formed as an air refueling squadron by Strategic Air Command in 1949. Today, it operates the KC-46 Pegasus aircraft, conducting air refueling missions.

== History ==
=== Origins ===
The Aviation Section, U.S. Signal Corps activated the squadron on 12 May 1915. It was the second to be organized in the United States Army, as noted by its numerical designation. It was organized at Rockwell Field, San Diego, California, where the only Aviation School at that time was located, and it was from this school that most of its squadron members came from. Other members were taken from the 1st Aero Squadron, which was the only completely equipped squadron in the Army.

It was the policy of the Aviation School to completely train and equip a squadron before sending it into the field. The squadron consisted of six flying officers and thirty-nine enlisted men, primarily mechanics. Two officers and ten men were transferred from the 1st Aero Squadron. It sailed from San Francisco for Manila on 5 January 1916. After two weeks of quarantine, the unit reached its station on Corregidor on 14 February without aircraft. It was the first complete aviation unit assigned outside of the United States.

The 2nd received four Martin S-Hydro seaplanes (Signal Corps numbers 56–59) on 13 March and 15 April, and began flying on 8 May 1916. A radio transmitter was set up in one aircraft, giving the aircraft a broadcast range of 29 miles. On 28 June, the company provided artillery spotting and adjustment for target practice with the Fort Mills batteries. Personnel for a second company were assembled and the unit was re-designated the 2nd Aero Squadron on 20 July 1917.

=== World War I ===
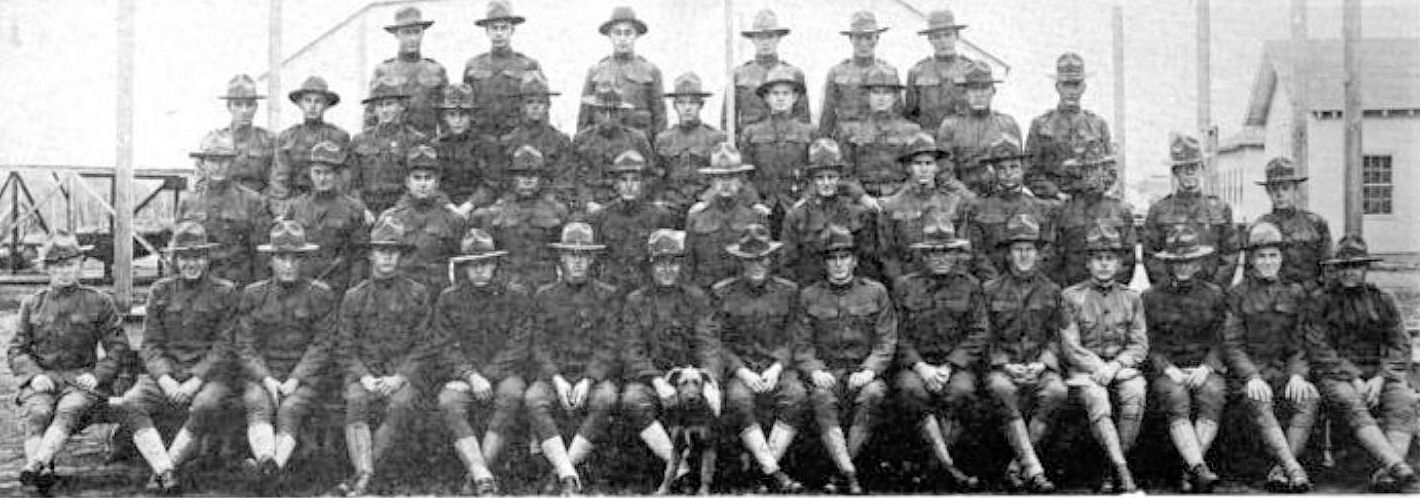
2d Aero Squadron (Later Squadron "A"), Kelly Field Texas, 1918

After the United States entered World War I, the squadron was ordered back to the United States. It sailed from Manila on 15 October 1917, arriving in San Francisco on 17 November. It was immediately transferred to Kelly Field, Texas, reaching the post on 22 November. At Kelly, a number of men were transferred and sent to the new training airfields that were being established throughout the country, serving as trainers for new recruits and as experienced backbones. Many of the men of the squadron were assigned to Call Field, Wichita Falls, Texas. The remainder of the squadron was sent to Kelly Field #2, which meant that the squadron would be a training unit at Kelly (Kelly Field #1 was used for training personnel for overseas service).

At Field #2, the mechanics began assembling Curtiss JN-4D Trainers. After a few months, the men had little time to worry about their assignment at Kelly Field when suddenly various squadrons began to be ordered for overseas duty in France. The men of the squadron began to submit transfer requests to be included in these outgoing squadrons. Some transfers were approved, however most were retained at Kelly Field. The 2nd squadron was assigned to "Advanced Cross Country" and "Aerobatic" flight training. The squadron was re-designated as Squadron "A", Kelly Field, on 1 July 1918. At the end of the war, only six members of the squadron remained from the initial cadre that was formed up in San Diego in 1915. The squadron was demobilized on 18 November 1918.

=== Inter-war years ===
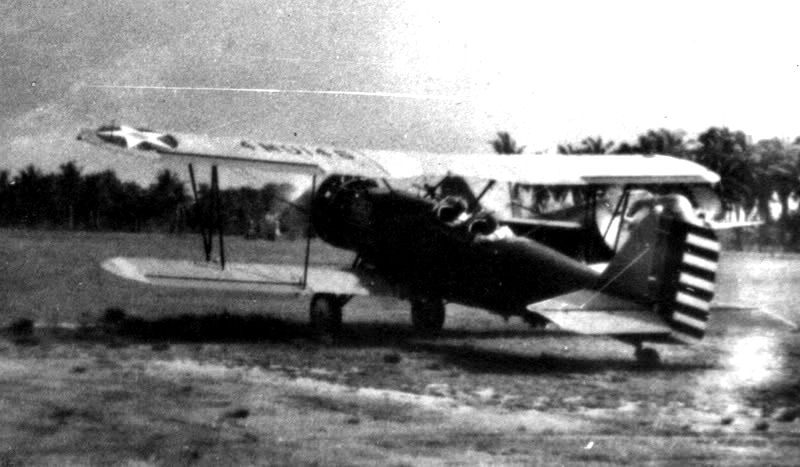
2nd Observation Squadron Thomas-Morse O-19, Nichols Field, Luzon, Philippine Islands, about 1932

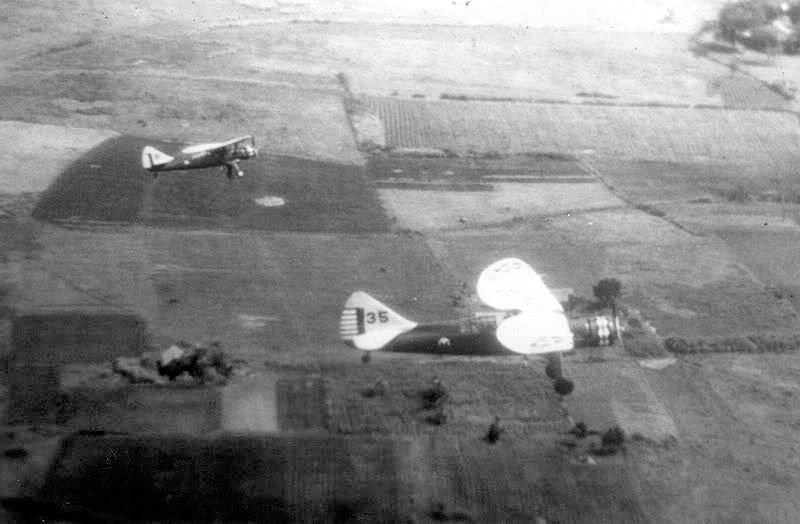
2nd Observation Squadron Douglas O-46s in flight over Luzon, Philippines, 1938.

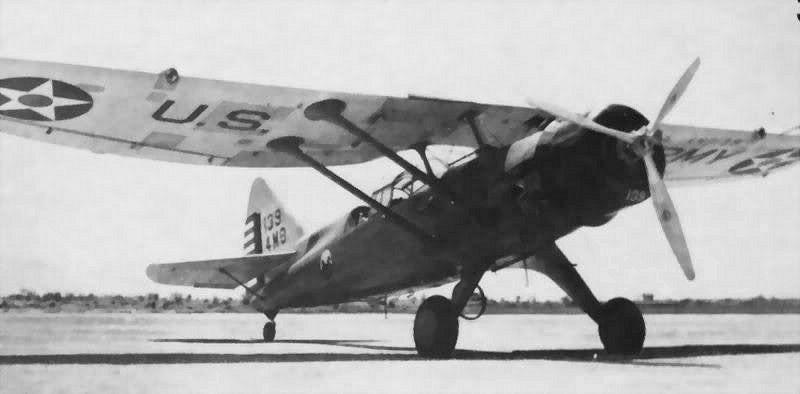
2nd Observation Squadron Douglas O-46A 36-139 Clark Field, Luzon, Philippines, 1941 (4M tail designation of 4th Composite Group)

After World War I, the unit was re-organized as a new organization, designated as the 2d Aero Squadron on 3 June 1919 at Rockwell Field, California. A few days later, it was re-designated as the 2d Aero Squadron (Observation). Many of the men were experienced mechanics and officers who had served either in France or at training units in the United States during World War I. After being organized, the squadron was transferred by train to San Francisco, California, where it boarded a ship bound for Manila, in the Philippine Islands, arriving on 24 December. The squadron was assigned to the Philippine Department, and was stationed initially at Kindley Field, on Corregidor Island. The squadron was equipped with some Curtiss HS2L and N-9 amphibian flying boats.

Initially attached to Post Headquarters, Fort Mills, it became part of the 1st Observation (later 4th Composite Group) on 10 March 1920. The squadron's primary mission was coastal patrols and reconnaissance in and around the Manila Bay region. It participated in exercises and maneuvers with Army ground forces and Naval forces were a regular and important part of its mission. Another mission of the 2nd Observation Squadron during the 1920s was aerial mapping of the Philippines, the topography of many of the islands were largely unknown. On 8 April 1924, it was formally consolidated with its World War I and Philippines predecessor unit, giving the squadron a history dating to 1 December 1915. As with other squadrons in the Philippines, the 2d received a wide variety of second-line hand-me-down aircraft transferred from units in the United States during the austere years of Air Corps procurement during the 1920s and 1930s. It operated various Loening seaplanes, Dayton-Wright DH-4s, Thomas-Morse O-19s, Sikorsky and Douglas Dolphin amphibians, as well as other aircraft that the Army would send from the United States that it thought could be used in the Philippines. In June 1929, the squadron was moved off Corregidor to the 4th Composite Group and Philippines Department Headquarters at Nichols Field, near Manila.

As a result of the rising tensions with the Japanese Empire in 1940, the defenses of the Philippines were judged to be abysmal, and a reinforcement effort was made to defend the islands against any Japanese aggression. Although beginning in 1938, the Army sent some Douglas O-46 observation monoplanes, these were supplemented in 1941 with some new Curtiss O-52 Owls, and the squadron was moved to Clark Field on 1 November 1940. In late 1941, the 4th Composite Group was broken up due to the expanding Air Corps presence in the Philippines. The pursuit squadrons were assigned to the new 24th Pursuit Group and the 28th Bomb Squadron was assigned to the incoming 19th Bombardment Group. The 2d Observation Squadron was reassigned directly to Far East Air Force (FEAF) headquarters as a courier and reconnaissance squadron, reporting to the Headquarters staff. It was moved to Nichols Field on 1 November.

=== World War II ===
The Japanese attack on the Air Corps bases in the Philippines on 8 December 1941 destroyed two of the O-46s at Nichols Field, and almost all of the O-52s. With Japanese control of the air over Luzon during December 1941, the unarmed planes of the 2nd Observation Squadron were overwhelmed by Japanese forces. By the time FEAF headquarters moved to Darwin, Australia on 31 December 1941, the remainder of the squadron's aircraft were destroyed either on the ground or in the air. The order for all Air Corps units to move to Bataan Airfield in early January 1942 meant that any remaining squadron personnel left the Manila area. The remains of the squadron were scattered among remaining Air Corps resistance forces during the ensuing battle in the early spring of 1942. They were likely being assigned to Army ground forces under V Interceptor Command.

The 2nd Observation Squadron was carried on as an active unit under the Fifth Air Force after 5 May 1942 until 2 April 1946 when it was inactivated.

=== Strategic Air Command ===
In the postwar years, limited funding for the Department of Defense meant that Strategic Air Command(SAC) was in severe short supply in the number of units it could support with personnel. SAC also wanted its units to have pre-World War II designations for its units as much as possible. The development of In-flight refueling, long a dream of airmen, was being developed for operational use in the late 1940s. In 1948, the 2nd Bombardment Group deployed to England during the Berlin Blockade, but its B-29 Superfortreses could not reach Moscow if a war broke out from its base in England without it being a one-way mission due to a lack of range.

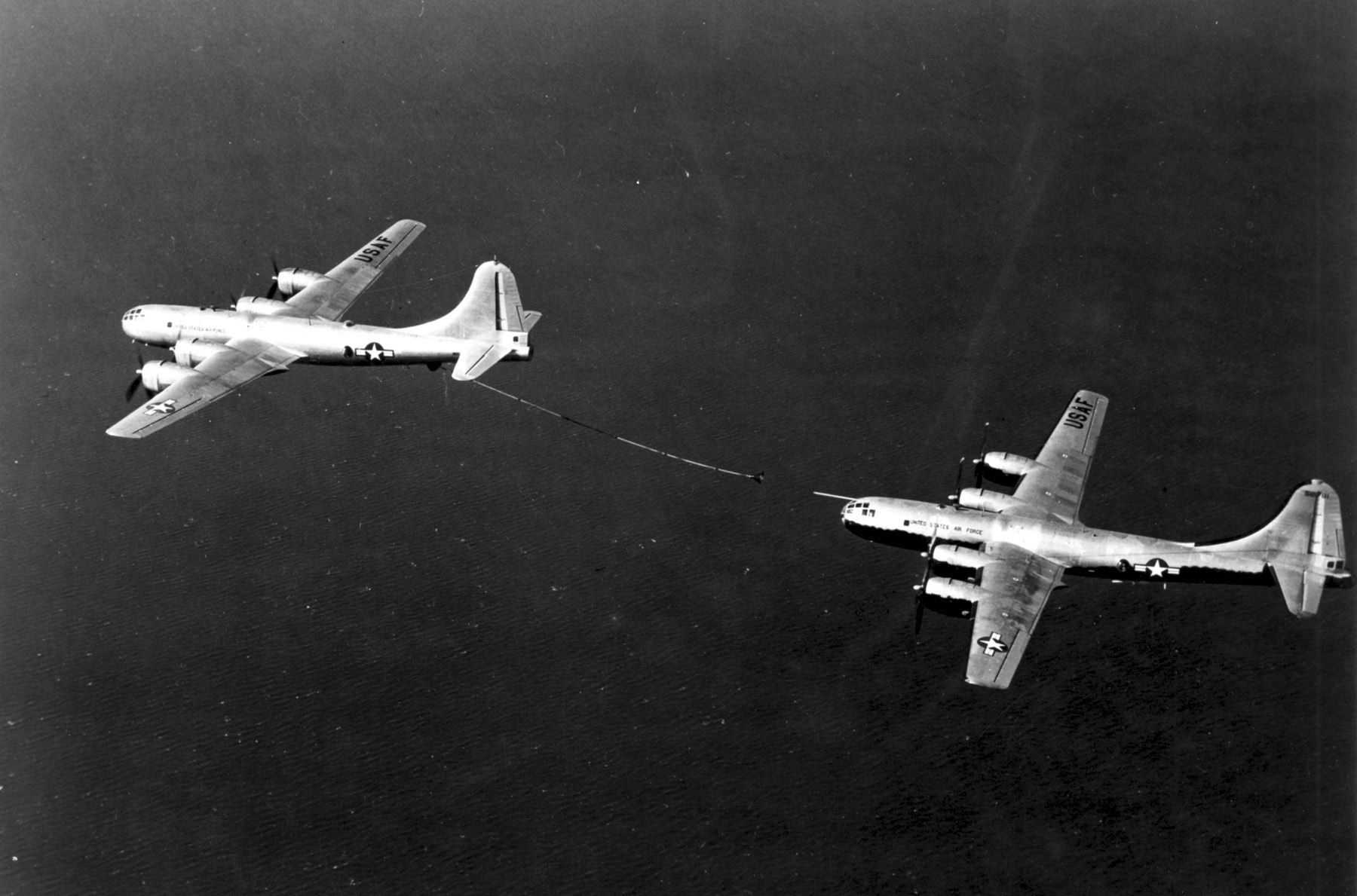
KB-29M air refueling another B-29MR Superfortress, modified with a nose probe.

SAC activated the 2d Air Refueling Squadron, (Medium) on 1 January 1949 as a new squadron at Davis-Monthan Air Force Base, Arizona and it was assigned to the like-designated 2d Bombardment Group. It was one of the first units to be equipped with the new KB-29M Superfortress tankers equipped with a British-developed hose refueling system. The 2d Bomb Group was transitioning to the new B-50A Superfortress bomber, and SAC was anxious to give its B-50s an air-refueling capability to extend its range.

The Group spent the next months training refueling the bombers with the tankers before the Wing was transferred to its operational base at Chatham Air Force Base, Georgia on 16 September 1949. Within a few months, the Wing's first deployment to England took place with its KB-29M tankers in February 1950. The KB-29s were forward deployed to The KB-29Ms flew via Westover Air Force Base, Massachusetts, and Keflavik, Iceland. However, the extremely cold weather in Iceland (−25 °F) caused difficulties with the aircraft, and the en route MATS services were inadequate. Also, the operation of the hose refueling system was, what was called a "Rube Goldberg Affair". In addition, it was found that malfunctions in the hose system meant fuel leaks were a hazard. After exercises in England and West Germany, the Wing returned to Chatham in April.

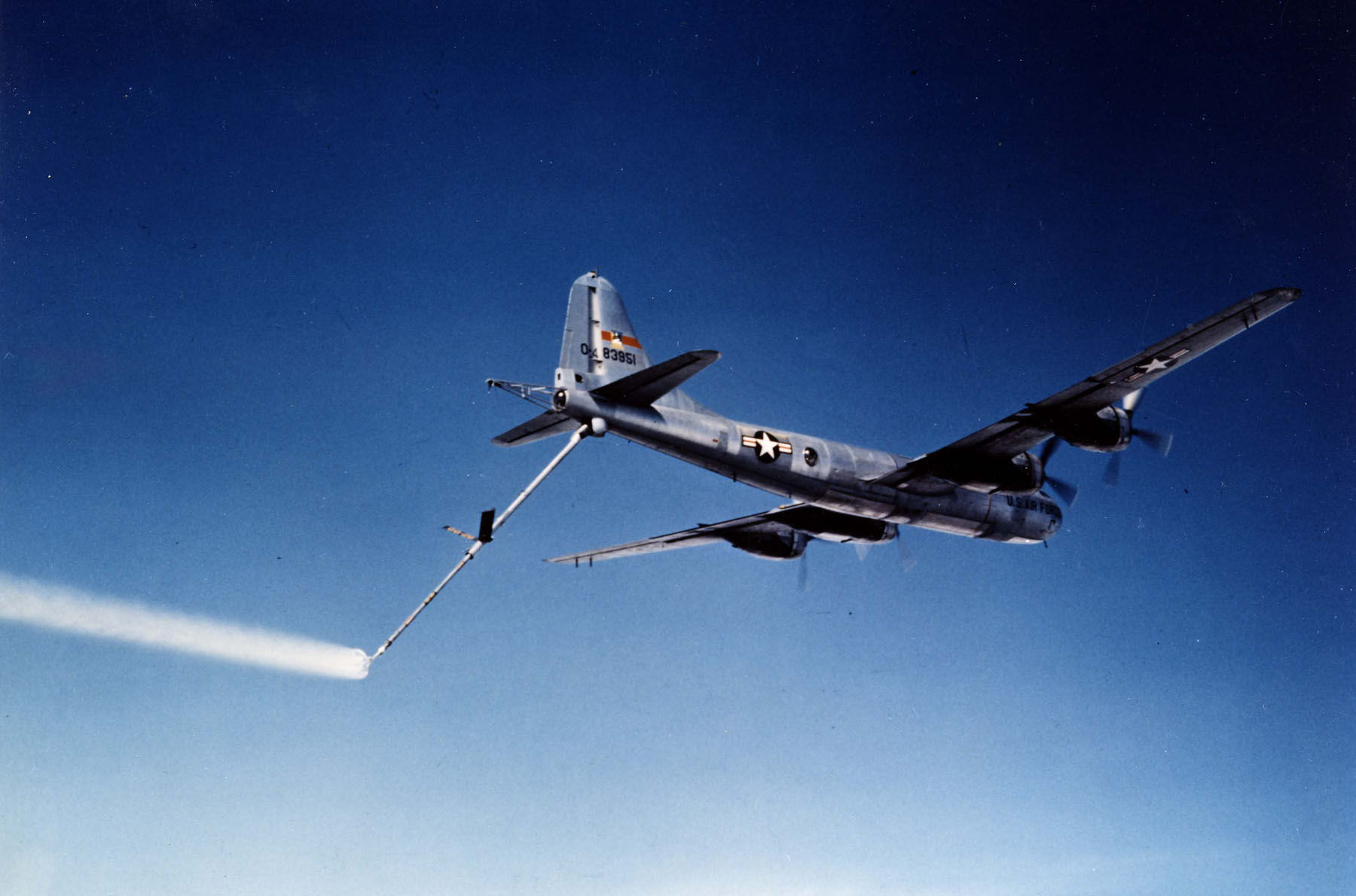
KB-29P with the flying boom extended

During May and June, it began receiving the Boeing-developed KB-29P using the flying boom aerial refueling technique which is still in use today. The wing also transitioned from B-50As to B-50D models, and the next several months were sent in transition training. In May 1951, the wing was ordered deployed to several bases in England, with the 2d ARS being assigned to RAF Lakenheath. None of the problems experienced with the hose and reel system of the KB-29Ms, and, also because of the warmer weather, the deployment was a much more successful operation. However, during operations in England, on 7 June a KB-29 crashed near Kircudreightshire, Scotland. The 2d ARS had the distinction of performing the first USAF refueling of an RAF aircraft, when it refueled three RAF Meteors from RAF Tarrant Tuston. The squadron also flew its first mission to the new SAC base at Sidi Slimane Air Base, French Morocco when a KB-29 landed on the unfinished runway on 13 July. On the redeployment to the United States at the end of August, all 19 of the squadrons KB-29Ps were to fly from Lakenheath to the Wing's new home at Hunter Air Force Base, Georgia, on a great circle route. This was the longest over-water non-stop flight over the Atlantic in which all aircraft departed the same day and landed on the next. The bombers returned to Hunter at the end of September, and as they approached the Atlantic Coast, they were met by the KB-29Ps. 47 hook-ups were made to refuel two squadrons of B-50s, taking 75.5 total flying hours and 10,140 gallons of aviation gasoline. No incidents were experienced.

In July 1952, the squadron supported the deployment of the F-84s of the 31st Fighter-Escort Wing at Turner Air Force Base, Georgia to Japan. The operation began on 4 July when the tankers refueled the F-84s over Wink, Texas, en route to Castle Air Force Base, California. Trans-Pacific refuelings were accomplished, and the 2d was joined by tankers from the 91st and 93d ARS as they island-hopped from Castle to Hickam Air Force Base, Hawaii, Midway Island, Wake Island, Eniwetok Atoll, Guam, Iwo Jima and on to Japan in an 11,000 mile mission. The 2d returned to Hunter on 11 July. Another deployment to RAF Lakenheath was made in September 1952, with the 2d ARS providing support to both SAC B-50 and B-29 bombers, as well as F-84 fighters of the federalized 137th Fighter-Bomber Wing, which was deployed to England. The squadron returned in December.

In August 1953, the squadron was stood down and all of its KB-29s were transferred to Tactical Air Command. The crews were sent to various training schools. In October, the first KC-97G Stratotanker arrived, the last of 22 new aircraft in January 1954. Although propeller-driven, the KC-97s were significantly faster than the KB-29s and were designed for aerial refueling. The planes were designed to refuel SAC's B-47E Stratojet swept-wing medium bomber, with the 2d Bombardment Wing began to receive also in 1953.

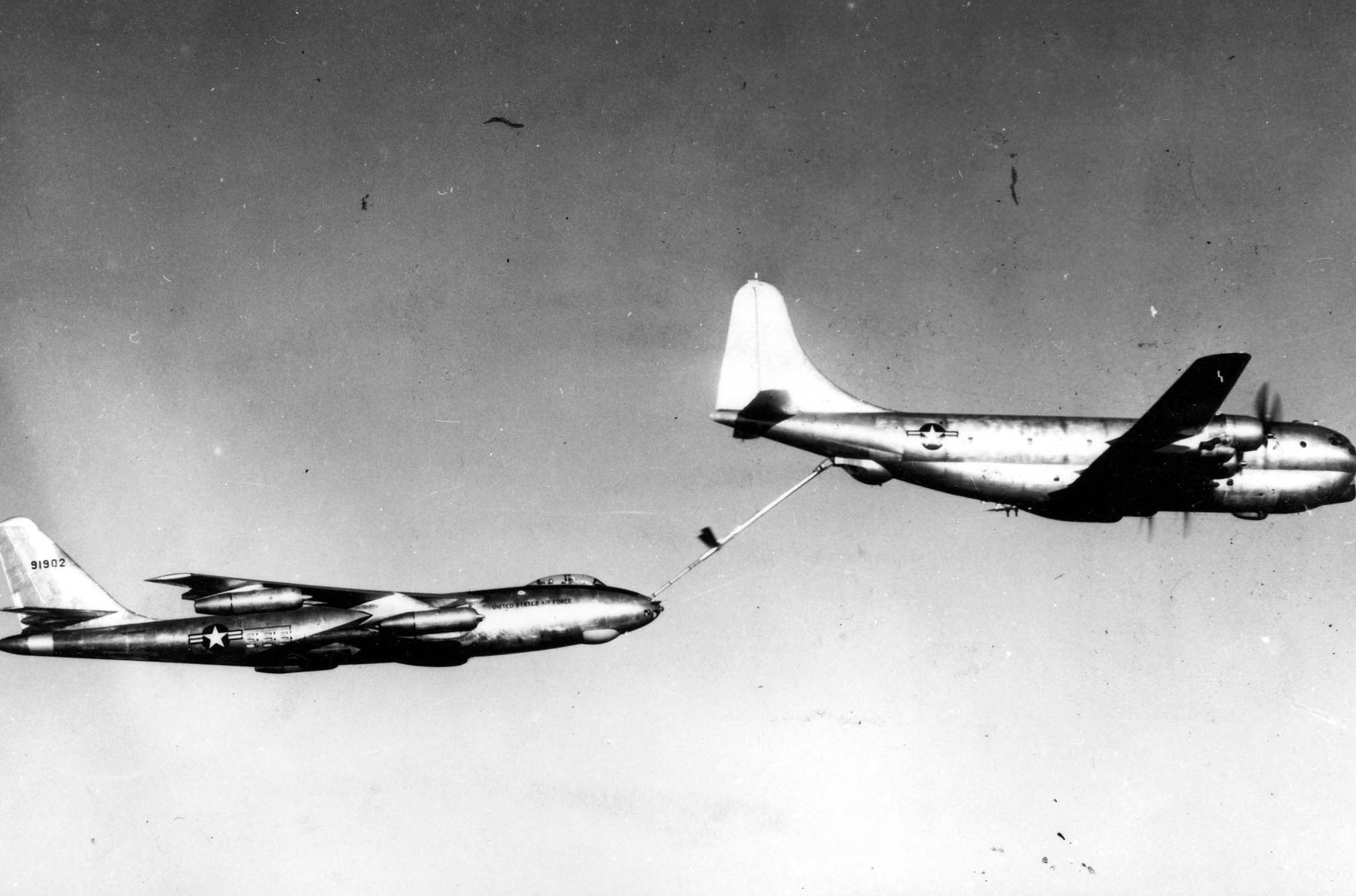
A 2d ARS KC-97 refueling a B-47 Stratojet in the late 1950s

On 6–7 August 1954, KC-97s from the 2d ARS refueled B-47s during "Operation Leap Frog", a 10,000 mile non-stop flight from Hunter to French Morocco and back to Hunter. The KC-97s were forward deployed to Lajes Field, Azores prior to the B-47s leaving Hunter. On the return flight back, Kindsley Field, Bermuda was the forward deployment point for the 2d ARS. This demonstrated the capability of the KC-97 and B-47 to perform together. For the next decade, the squadron carried out routine Operation Reflex deployments to SAC bases French Morocco, as well as training flights in the United States. In the late 1950s, the jet-powered KC-135 Stratotanker was developed, and with the retirement of the B-47 from SAC service, the 2d Air Refueling Squadron was inactivated in April 1963 concurrently with the move of SAC out of Hunter.

On 19 September 1985, the 2nd Air Refueling Squadron was consolidated with the 2d Observation Squadron (Medium), a unit that was last active 2 April 1946. This action was directed by Department of the Air Force Letter DAF/MPM 662q Attachment 2 (Inactive Units), 19 September 1985. The Consolidated Unit retained the Designation of 2d Air Refueling Squadron, Heavy", and the consolidation gave the SAC organization a history dating to 1915.

The squadron was re-activated on 3 January 1989 as part of the 2nd Bombardment Wing at Barksdale Air Force Base, Louisiana as part of a SAC reorganization of its KC-10 Extender tanker fleet to have 2 squadrons of 10 tankers each. It was equipped with KC-10s transferred from the 32d Air Refueling Squadron.

=== Modern era ===
With the inactivation of Strategic Air Command in June 1992 and the realignment of Air Mobility Command's tanker force, the 2d ARS was reassigned to the 458th Operations Group on 1 June 1992. Using KC-10 aircraft, the squadron airlifted humanitarian equipment and supplies to Somalia, 1992–1994. Deployed aircrews and aircraft on other contingency operations in many parts of the world, including Haiti in 1994.

It continued operations from Barksdale until 1 October 1994 when it was moved to McGuire Air Force Base, New Jersey where it was transferred to the 305th Operations Group on 1 July 1995. It supported NATO operations over Serbia in 1999. The squadron also refueled aircraft enforcing no-fly zones over Bosnia and Herzegovina in the mid-1990s and over northern and southern Iraq between 1992 and 2002.

Today, the 2nd ARS continues to remain ready to provide the United States with the global reach necessary to support its national security objectives, while placing an increased emphasis on squadron members' families-the unsung heroes of the unit's successful operations.

== Lineage ==
Squadron A, Kelly Field

- Organized as the 1st Company, 2d Aero Squadron on 1 December 1915

Redesignated 2d Aero Squadron on 20 July 1917
Redesignated Squadron A, Kelly Field, on 23 July 1918
Demobilized on 18 November 1918

- Consolidated 8 April 1924 with the 2d Observation Squadron as the 2d Observation Squadron

2d Observation Squadron

- Organized as 2d Aero Squadron on 3 June 1919

Redesignated 2d Aero Squadron (Observation) on 5 June 1919
Redesignated 2d Squadron (Observation) on 14 March 1921
Redesignated 2d Observation Squadron on 25 January 1923

- Consolidated 8 April 1924 with Squadron A, Kelly Field

Redesignated 2d Observation Squadron (Medium) on 26 February 1942
Inactivated on 2 April 1946

- Consolidated on 19 September 1985 with the 2d Air Refueling Squadron, Medium as the 2d Air Refueling Squadron, Heavy

2d Air Refueling Squadron
Constituted as the 2d Air Refueling Squadron, Medium on 27 October 1948
Activated on 1 January 1949
Discontinued and inactivated on 1 April 1963

- Consolidated on 19 September 1985 with the 2d Observation Squadron' and redesignated 2d Air Refueling Squadron, Heavy (Remained inactive)

Activated on 3 January 1989
Redesignated 2d Air Refueling Squadron on 1 September 1991

=== Assignments ===
- Post Headquarters, Rockwell Field, 1 December 1915
- Philippine Department, February 1916 (attached to Post Headquarters, Fort William McKinley, February 1916, Post Headquarters, Fort Mills, Corregidor, February 1916)
- Philippine Department, February 1916 (attached to Post Headquarters, Fort Mills, 24 December 1919)
- Post Headquarters, Kelly Field, November 1917 - 18 November 1918
- Post Headquarters, Rockwell Field, 3 June 1919
- 1st Observation Group (later 4th Observation Group, 4th Composite Group), 10 March 1920
- Far East Air Force (later Fifth Air Force), 28 October 1941 – 2 April 1946
- 2d Bombardment Group, 1 January 1949 (attached to 2d Bombardment Wing after 10 February 1951 )
- 2d Bombardment Wing, 16 June 1952 – 1 April 1963; 3 January 1989
- 2d Operations Group, 1 September 1991
- 458th Operations Group, 1 June 1992
- 305th Operations Group, 1 July 1995–present

=== Stations ===
- Rockwell Field, San Diego, California, 1 December 1915 – 2 January 1916
- Fort William McKinley, Luzon, Philippine Islands, 3 February 1916
- Fort Mills, Corregidor, Philippine Islands, 14 February 1916-c. 15 October 1917
- Kelly Field, Texas, November 1917-18 November 1918
- Rockwell Field, California, 5 June-29 November 1919
- Fort Mills, Corregidor, Philippine Islands, 24 December 1919
- Kindley Field, Corregidor, Philippine Islands, 15 October 1920
- Nichols Field, Luzon, Philippine Islands, June 1929
- Clark Field, Luzon, Philippine Islands, 1 November 1940
- Nichols Field, Luzon, Philippine Islands, November–December 1941
- Davis-Monthan Air Force Base, Arizona, 1 January 1949
- Chatham Air Force Base, Georgia, 16 September 1949

Deployed at: RAF Marham, England, February–April 1950 (KB-29M)
Deployed at: RAF Lakenheath, England, May–September 1951 (KB-29P)

- Hunter Air Force Base, Georgia, 28 September 1951 – 1 April 1963

Deployed at: Ben Guerir Air Base, French Morocco, August–September 1954 (KC-97G)
Deployed at: Sidi Slimane Air Base, French Morocco, July–August 1956 (KC-97G)
Deployed at: Ernest Harmon Air Force Base, Labrador, February 1961 (KC-97G)

- Barksdale Air Force Base, Louisiana, 3 January 1989
- McGuire Air Force Base, New Jersey, 1 October 1994 – present

=== Aircraft ===
- Martin S-Hydro (1916–1917)
- Curtiss JN-4 (1917–1918)
- Curtiss HS2L (1919–1925)
- Curtiss Model N-9 (1919–1925)
- Loening S-1 (1919–1925, 1925–1931)
- Dayton-Wright DH-4 (1919–1925, 1925–1931)
- Douglas O-2 (1925–1931)
- Douglas World Cruiser O-5 (1925–1931)
- Loening OA-1 (1925–1931)
- Loening COA-1 (1925–1931)
- Thomas-Morse O-19 (1931–1938)
- Sikorsky C-6 (1931–1938)
- Douglas OA-3 Dolphin (1931–1938)
- Douglas O-46 (1938–1941)
- Douglas OA-4 Dolphin (1938–1941)
- Grumman OA-9 Goose (1938–1941)
- O-52 Owl (1941)
- KB-29M/P Superfortress (1950–1953)
- KC-97G Stratofreighter (1953–1963)
- KC-10 Extender (1989–2021)
- KC-46 Pegasus (2021–Present)

== Commanders ==
- Capt R. Gilpin Ervin, Dec 1920
- Capt Junius H. Houghton, 15 Dec 1921
- Maj Thomas J. Hanley Jr., 7 Mar 1922
- Capt Idwal H. Edwards, 22 Sep 1922
- Maj Benjamin G. Weir, 6 Oct 1922
- Capt Idwal H. Edwards, 24 Mar 1923
- Capt Vernon L. Burge, 26 Jun 1923
- Capt Morris Berman, Apr 1925
- Maj Leo A. Walton, 16 Dec 1925
- Capt Louis R. Knight, 26 Feb 1926
- Capt Elmer E. Adler, 7 Mar 1927
- 1Lt Vincent J. Meloy, 20 Jan 1928
- Capt Donald Wilson, 10 Apr 1929
- Capt Benjamin F. Giles, 1 Sep 1929
- Capt Arthur E. Easterbrook, 1 Aug 1930
- Capt Edgar P. Sorenson, 19 Dec 1931
- Capt Harold R. Rivers, 15 Feb 1934
- Maj Martinus Stenseth, 1 Mar 1934
- Capt James F. Phillips, 6 Feb 1936
- 1Lt John W. Kirby, 8 May 1937 (acting)
- Capt Mark K. Lewis Jr., 1 Jun 1937
- 1Lt Alfred R. Maxwell, 1 Oct 1937
- Capt John P. Kirkendall, 21 Feb 1938
- Maj Lloyd C. Blackburn, 11 May 1938
- Unknown, Sep 1939
- 1Lt John A. Goodpasture, Nov 1940-Jan 41
- Capt James Y. Parker, Sep 1941-Jan 42

Source: by Clay, Steven E., US Army Order of Battle 1919–1941 - Volume 3: The Services: Air Service, Engineers, and Special Troops, 1919–41

== See also ==
- List of American Aero Squadrons
