= Matt Maiocco =

American sportswriter (born 1967)

- Born: January 26, 1967 (age 59); Corning, California, U.S.
- Education: Humboldt State University, B.A. Journalism, 1990
- Occupation: Journalist
- Notable credit: The Press Democrat
- Spouse: Sarah Munson Maiocco
- Children: 2

Matt Maiocco (born January 26, 1967) is an American sportswriter best known for his work as the beat reporter of the San Francisco 49ers for the Santa Rosa Press Democrat. He currently serves as the San Francisco 49ers beat reporter for NBC Sports Bay Area.

== Biography ==
Maiocco attended Humboldt State University in Arcata, California from 1988 to 1990 and graduated in 1990 with a degree in journalism. Born in Corning, California, Maiocco lives in the Bay Area with his wife, Sarah, and their daughters, Jane and Lucy.

Maiocco has covered the San Francisco 49ers on a daily basis for more than two decades. He writes regular stories about the team and also provides constant updates through his "Instant 49er's" blog, his Facebook page and even Twitter. Maiocco is featured numerous times weekly on 95.7 The Game as the 49ers Insider, and can be seen on ESPN where he has been added as a regular contributor to the "First Take" show.

== Career ==
- 1988-1992: Sports reporter at The Eureka Times-Standard
- 1993 - 1995: Sports editor at The Argus (Fremont, Calif.)
- 1995 - 1997: 49ers beat reporter at the Oakland Tribune (Alameda Newspaper Group)
- 1997 - 1999: 49ers beat reporter at the Contra Costa Times
- 1999–2010: 49ers beat reporter at the Santa Rosa Press Democrat
- 2010 – Present: 49ers beat reporter at NBC Sports Bay Area

== Awards ==
Maiocco is a three-time Pro Football Writers of America award winner for game stories and features.

In 2007 his Instant 49ers blog was ranked as the No. 2 NFL team blog in the country by Rotoworld.

== Published books ==
- Roger Craig's Tales from the San Francisco 49ers Sideline (Roger Craig with Matt Maiocco), (Sports Publishing, 2004) ISBN 9781582613079
- San Francisco 49ers: Where Have You Gone?: Joe Montana, Y. A. Tittle, Steve Young, and Other 49ers Greats (Sports Publishing, 2005) ISBN 9781582619941
  - Second edition with David Fucillo (Sports Publishing, 2011) ISBN 9781613210451
- San Francisco 49ers: The Complete Illustrated History (MVP Books, 2013) ISBN 978-0760344736
- Letters to 87: Fans Remember the Legacy of Dwight Clark (Cameron Books, 2019) ISBN 978-1944903770
