= Martin S =

1915 American observation seaplane

Model S
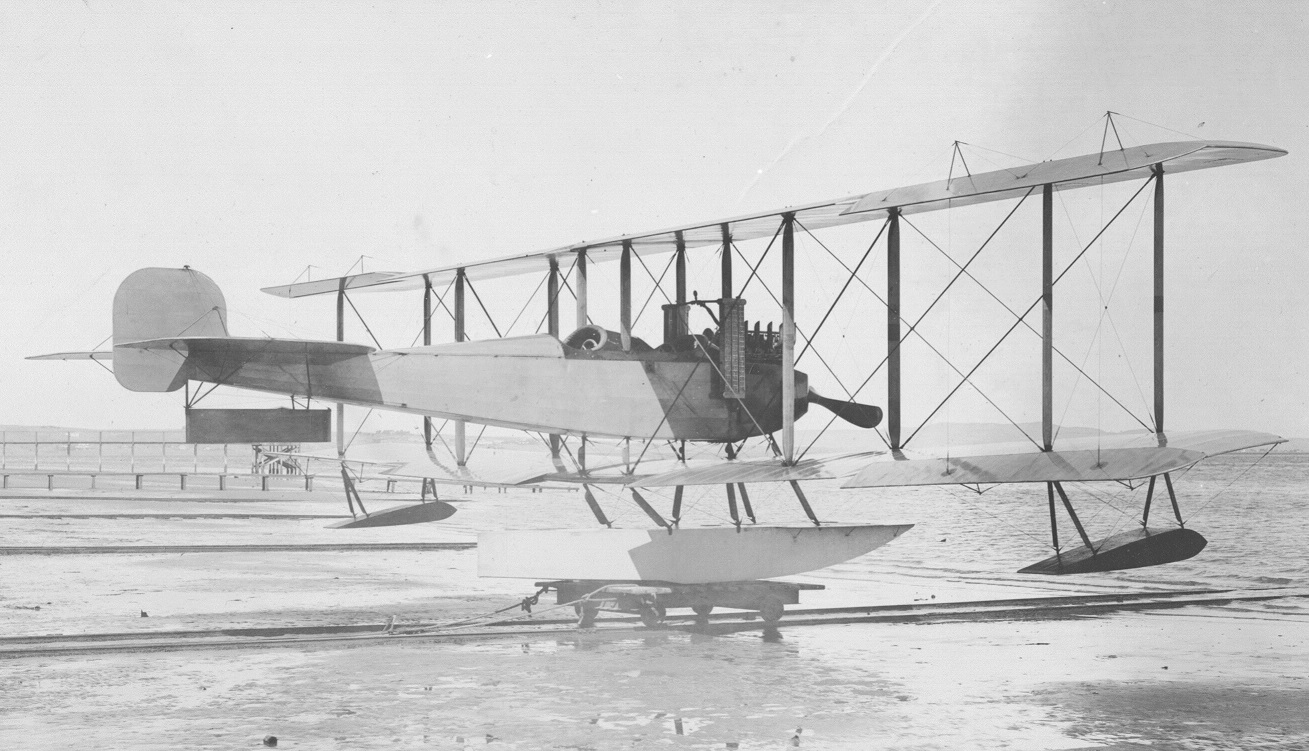

General information
- Type: Observation seaplane
- National origin: United States
- Manufacturer: Martin
- Designer: Donald Douglas
- Primary user: Aviation Section, U.S. Signal Corps
- Number built: 6 or 16

History
- First flight: 1915
- Developed from: Martin T

The Martin S was a two-seat observation seaplane produced by the Glenn L. Martin Company in the United States in 1915. Designed along the same general lines as the preceding Model T, it was a largely conventional two-bay biplane with unstaggered wings of equal span. The fuselage was not directly attached to the lower wings, but was carried on struts in the interplane gap. The undercarriage consisted of a single large pontoon below the fuselage and outrigger floats near the wingtips. The Model S was 23-year-old Donald Douglas' first and only design for the Martin company, and it set three world altitude records and a flight duration record that stood for three years.

Six, possibly fourteen, of these aircraft were operated by the Aviation Section, U.S. Signal Corps, and another two by the United States Navy. All of the Army aircraft, S.C. 56-59 and 94-95, were assigned to the first U.S. aviation unit based overseas, the 1st Company, 2d Aero Squadron at Fort Mills, Corregidor, in March and April 1916, where they used a radio transmitter with a range of 29 miles to adjust battery fire for the Coast Artillery.

== Operators ==
United States

- United States Army
- United States Navy

== Specifications ==
Data from aerofiles.com

General characteristics

- Crew: two, pilot and observer
- Length: 29 ft 7 in (9.02 m)
- Wingspan: 46 ft 5 in (14.15 m)
- Powerplant: 1 × Hall-Scott A-5 , 125 hp (93 kW)

Performance

- Maximum speed: 85 mph (136 km/h, 74 kn)
