= List of places in California (C) =

List of places in California – C

This list of current:

- cities
- towns, unincorporated communities
- counties, and other recognized places in the U.S. state of California.

Information on the number and names of counties in which the place lies, and its lower and upper ZIP Code bounds, if applicable are also included.

Name of place	Number of counties	Principal county	Lower zip code	Upper zip code
Cabazon	1	Riverside County	92230	
Cabazon Indian Reservation	1	Riverside County	92201	
Cabin Cove	1	Tulare County		
Cabrillo	1	Los Angeles County	90810	
Cabrillo Estates	1	San Luis Obispo County	93401	
Cabrillo National Monument	1	San Diego County	92106	
Cache Creek	1	Kern County	93501	
Cachil Dehe Rancheria	1	Colusa County		
Cachuma	1	Santa Barbara County	93101	
Cachuma Village	1	Santa Barbara County	93101	
Cactus City	1	Riverside County		
Cadenasso	1	Yolo County		
Cadiz	1	San Bernardino County	92319	
Cadwell	1	Sonoma County		
Cahuilla	1	Riverside County	92539	
Cahuilla Estates	1	Riverside County	92539	
Cahuilla Hills	1	Riverside County	92260	
Cahuilla Indian Reservation	1	Riverside County	92263	
Cain Rock	1	Humboldt County		
Cairns	1	Tulare County		
Cairns Corner	1	Tulare County	93247	
Cajon	1	San Bernardino County		
Cajon Junction	1	San Bernardino County	92407	
Calabasas	1	Los Angeles County	91302	
Calabasas Highlands	1	Los Angeles County	91364	
Calabasas Hills	1	Los Angeles County	91301	
Calabasas Park	1	Los Angeles County	91364	
Calada	1	San Bernardino County		
Calaveras	1	San Joaquin County	95207	
Calaveras Yacht and Country Club Estates	1	San Joaquin County	95204	
Calaveritas	1	Calaveras County	95249	
Calavo Gardens	1	San Diego County	91941	
Caldor	1	El Dorado County		
Caldors Corner	1	Kern County	93312	
Caldwell Pines	1	Lake County		
Calexico	1	Imperial County	92231	
Calexico Lodge	1	San Diego County		
Calflax	1	Fresno County		
Calgro	1	Tulare County		
Calico	1	San Bernardino County	92398	
Cal-Ida	1	Sierra County		
Caliente	1	Kern County	93518	
California City	1	Kern County	93505	
California Heights	1	Los Angeles County		
California Hot Springs	1	Tulare County	93207	
California Valley	1	San Luis Obispo County	93453	
Calimesa	1	Riverside County	92320	
Calipatria	1	Imperial County	92233	
Calistoga	1	Napa County	94515	
Calla	1	San Joaquin County		
Calla	1	San Joaquin County	95336	
Callahan	1	Siskiyou County	96014	
Callender	1	San Luis Obispo County		
Calneva	1	Lassen County		
Calpack	1	Merced County	95340	
Calpella	1	Mendocino County	95418	
Calpine	1	Sierra County	96124	
Calville	1	Humboldt County	95521	
Calwa	1	Fresno County	93725	
Calzona	1	San Bernardino County		
Camanche	1	Calaveras County		
Camanche Lake	1	Amador County	95640	
Camarillo	1	Ventura County	93010	12
Camarillo Heights	1	Ventura County	93010	
Cambria	1	San Luis Obispo County	93428	
Cambrian Park	1	Santa Clara County	95124	
Cambrian Village	1	Santa Clara County		
Cambria Pines	1	San Luis Obispo County	93428	
Cambria Pines Manor	1	San Luis Obispo County	93428	
Camden	1	Fresno County	93242	
Camellia	1	Sacramento County	94819	
Camellia Station	1	Sacramento County	94819	
Cameo	1	Fresno County		
Cameo Acres	1	Contra Costa County	94526	
Cameron	1	Kern County		
Cameron	1	Mendocino County		
Cameron Corners	1	San Diego County	92006	
Cameron Creek Colony	1	Tulare County	93291	
Cameron Park	1	El Dorado County	95682	
Camino	1	El Dorado County	95709	
Camino Alta	1	Santa Clara County		
Camino Heights	1	El Dorado County	95709	
Campana	1	El Dorado County		
Camp Angelus	1	San Bernardino County		
Camp Bartlett	1	Ventura County		
Campbell	1	Santa Clara County	95008	
Campbell Hot Springs	1	Sierra County		
Campbellville	1	Tehama County		
Camp Connell	1	Calaveras County	95223	
Camp Earnest	1	Tuolumne County		
Camp Evers	1	Santa Cruz County		
Camphora	1	Monterey County		
Camp Irwin	1	San Bernardino County		
Camp Kaweah	1	Tulare County	93262	
Camp Meeker	1	Sonoma County	95419	
Camp Mendocino	1	Mendocino County		
Camp Nelson	1	Tulare County	93208	
Campo	1	San Diego County	91906	
Campo Indian Reservation	1	San Diego County	92006	
Campo Seco	1	Calaveras County	95226	
Camp Owens	1	Kern County		
Camp Pardee	1	Calaveras County		
Camp Parks	1	Alameda County	94501	
Camp Pendleton	1	San Diego County	92055	
Camp Pendleton North	1	San Diego County		
Camp Pendleton South	1	San Diego County		
Camp Pendola	1	Tuolumne County		
Camp Rest	1	Mendocino County		
Camp Richardson	1	El Dorado County	96156	
Camp Rodgers	1	Plumas County		
Camp Rose	1	Sonoma County		
Camp Sabrina	1	Inyo County	93514	
Camp Sierra	1	Fresno County	93664	
Camp Spaulding	1	Nevada County		
Camp Tamarack	1	Calaveras County		
Campton Heights	1	Humboldt County	95540	
Camptonville	1	Yuba County	95922	
Camp Wishon	1	Tulare County	93265	
Camulos	1	Ventura County	93040	
Canby	1	Modoc County	96015	
Canby Cross	1	Siskiyou County		
Canebrake	1	Kern County		
Canet	1	Ventura County		
Cannery Row	1	Monterey County		
Cannon	1	Solano County		
Canoga Annex	1	Los Angeles County	91304	
Canoga Park	1	Los Angeles County	91303	09
Cantil	1	Kern County	93519	
Cantua Creek	1	Fresno County	93608	
Canyon	1	Alameda County	94516	
Canyon Acres	1	Orange County		
Canyon City	1	San Diego County	92006	
Canyon Country	1	Los Angeles County	91351	90
Canyon Crest	1	Riverside County	92507	
Canyon Crest Heights	1	Riverside County		
Canyondam	1	Plumas County	95923	
Canyon Lake	1	Riverside County	92587	
Capay	1	Glenn County		
Capay	1	Yolo County	95607	
Cape Horn	1	Placer County	95713	
Capetown	1	Humboldt County	95536	
Capistrano Beach	1	Orange County	92524	
Capistrano Highlands	1	Orange County	92653	
Capital Hill	1	San Luis Obispo County	93446	
Capitan	1	Santa Barbara County		
Capitan Grande Indian Reservation	1	San Diego County	92001	
Capitola	1	Santa Cruz County	95010	
Car A	1	Siskiyou County		
Carbona	1	San Joaquin County	95376	
Carbon Canyon	1	San Bernardino County	91710	
Carbondale	1	Amador County	95640	
Cardiff	1	San Diego County	92007	
Cardiff-by-the-Sea	1	San Diego County	92007	
Cardwell	1	Fresno County	93704	
Caribou	1	Plumas County	95915	
Carlotta	1	Humboldt County	95528	
Carlsbad	1	San Diego County	92008	
Carlton	1	Imperial County		
Carlton	1	Orange County	92688	
Carlton Hills	1	San Diego County		
Carmel	1	Monterey County	93921	
Carmel-by-the-Sea	1	Monterey County	93921	
Carmel Highlands	1	Monterey County	93923	
Carmel Hills	1	Monterey County	93921	
Carmel Point	1	Monterey County	93921	
Carmel Valley	1	Monterey County	93924	
Carmel Valley Village	1	Monterey County	93924	
Carmel Woods	1	Monterey County	93921	
Carmenita	1	Los Angeles County	90670	
Carmet	1	Sonoma County	94923	
Carmichael	1	Sacramento County	95608	
Carnadero	1	Santa Clara County		
Carnelian Bay	1	Placer County	96140	
Carpinteria	1	Santa Barbara County	93013	
Carquinez Heights	1	Solano County	94590	
Carr	1	Santa Barbara County		
Carrick	1	Siskiyou County		
Carrick Addition	1	Siskiyou County	96094	
Carriso Gorge	1	San Diego County		
Carrolton	1	San Joaquin County		
Carrville	1	Trinity County		
Carson	1	Los Angeles County	90745	
Carson Hill	1	Calaveras County	95222	
Cartago	1	Inyo County	93549	
Caruthers	1	Fresno County	93609	
Carvin Creek Homesites	1	Sierra County		
Casa Blanca	1	Riverside County	92504	
Casa Conejo	1	Ventura County	91360	
Casa Correo	1	Contra Costa County	94521	
Casa de Oro	1	San Diego County	91977	
Casa de Oro-Mount Helix	1	San Diego County		
Casa Loma	1	Placer County	95704	
Cascade	1	Plumas County		
Casey Corner	1	Nevada County		
Casino	1	Santa Cruz County		
Casitas Springs	1	Ventura County	93001	
Casmalia	1	Santa Barbara County	93429	
Caspar	1	Mendocino County	95420	
Cassel	1	Shasta County	96016	
Castaic	1	Los Angeles County	91350	84
Castaic Junction	1	Los Angeles County	91384	
Castella	1	Shasta County	96017	
Castellammare	1	Los Angeles County	90272	
Castle	1	Merced County		
Castle	1	San Joaquin County		
Castle Crag	1	Shasta County		
Castle Garden	1	Merced County	95342	
Castle Park	1	San Diego County	92011	
Castle Park-Otay	1	San Diego County		
Castle Rock Springs	1	Lake County		
Castlewood	1	Alameda County	94568	
Castro City	1	Santa Clara County		
Castro Valley	1	Alameda County	94546	
Castroville	1	Monterey County	95012	
Casty	1	Fresno County		
Caswell	1	Los Angeles County		
Catalina	1	Los Angeles County	90704	
Cathay	1	Mariposa County		
Cathedral City	1	Riverside County	92234	
Catheys Valley	1	Mariposa County	95306	
Catlett	1	Sutter County		
Cave City	1	Calaveras County		
Cavin	1	Ventura County		
Cawelo	1	Kern County	93306	
Cayley	1	Alameda County		
Cayton	1	Shasta County	96013	
Cayucos	1	San Luis Obispo County	93430	
Cazadero	1	Sonoma County	95421	
Cecile	1	Fresno County		
Cecilville	1	Siskiyou County	96027	
Cedar	1	Los Angeles County	93243	
Cedarbrook	1	Fresno County	93641	
Cedar Crest	1	Fresno County	93605	
Cedar Flat	1	Placer County	96140	
Cedar Glen	1	San Bernardino County	92321	
Cedar Grove	1	El Dorado County	95709	
Cedar Grove	1	Fresno County	93633	
Cedar Mill	1	Plumas County		
Cedarpines Park	1	San Bernardino County	92322	
Cedar Ridge	1	Nevada County	95924	
Cedar Ridge	1	Tuolumne County	95370	
Cedar Rock Lodge	1	Tuolumne County		
Cedar Slope	1	Tulare County	93265	
Cedar Springs	1	Los Angeles County		
Cedarville	1	Modoc County	96104	
Cedarville Rancheria	1	Modoc County	95825	
Centerville	1	Alameda County		
Centerville	1	Butte County		
Centerville	1	Fresno County	93657	
Centerville	1	Shasta County		
Centerville District	1	Alameda County		
Centinela	1	Los Angeles County		
Central	1	Yolo County		
Central Camp	1	Madera County		
Central District	1	Los Angeles County	91766	
Centralia	1	Sacramento County		
Central Valley	1	Shasta County	96019	
Centre	1	Sacramento County	95860	
Century City	1	Los Angeles County	90067	
Ceres	1	Stanislaus County	95307	
Cerritos	1	Los Angeles County	90703	
Cerro Villa Heights	1	Orange County		
Chabot Terrace	1	Solano County		
Chadbourne	1	Solano County		
Chalfant	1	Mono County	93514	
Challenge	1	Yuba County	95925	
Challenge-Brownsville	1	Yuba County		
Chambers Lodge	1	Placer County	95718	
Chambless	1	San Bernardino County	92319	
Champagne	1	San Bernardino County		
Champagne Fountain	1	Santa Clara County	95070	
Channel Islands	1	Ventura County	93030	
Channel Islands Beach	1	Ventura County		
Channel Islands National Park	3	Los Angeles County	93030	
Channel Islands National Park	3	Santa Barbara County	93030	
Channel Islands National Park	3	Ventura County	93030	
Chapman	1	Los Angeles County		
Chapmantown	1	Butte County	95926	
Chapman Woods	1	Los Angeles County	91107	
Chappo	1	San Diego County	92055	
Charter Oak	1	Los Angeles County	91724	
Chase	1	San Bernardino County		
Chatsworth	1	Los Angeles County	91311	
Chatsworth Lake Manor	1	Los Angeles County	91311	
Chawanakee	1	Fresno County	93602	
Cheeseville	1	Siskiyou County		
Chemehuevi Indian Reservation	1	San Bernardino County	92363	
Chemeketa Park	1	Santa Clara County	95030	
Chemeketa Park-Redwood Estates	1	Santa Clara County		
Chemurgic	1	Stanislaus County		
Cherokee	1	Butte County	95965	
Cherokee	1	Nevada County	95959	
Cherokee	1	San Joaquin County		
Cherokee	1	Tuolumne County		
Cherokee Strip	1	Kern County	93263	
Cherry Creek Acres	1	Nevada County	95603	
Cherryland	1	Alameda County	94541	
Cherry Valley	1	Riverside County	92223	
Chester	1	Plumas County	96020	
Chesterton	1	San Diego County		
Chestnut	1	San Mateo County	94080	
Chestnut Junction	1	Alameda County		
Chianti	1	Sonoma County		
Chicago Park	1	Nevada County	95712	
Chicken Ranch Rancheria	1	Tuolumne County		
Chico	1	Butte County	95926	
Chico North	1	Butte County	95926	
Chico Vecino	1	Butte County	95926	
Chico West	1	Butte County		
Chilcoot	1	Plumas County	96105	
Chilcoot-Vinton	1	Plumas County		
Children's Fairyland	1	Alameda County	94610	
Childs Meadows	1	Tehama County	96063	
Chiles	1	Yolo County		
China	1	San Francisco County	94121	
China Lake	3	Inyo County	93555	
China Lake	3	Kern County	93555	
China Lake	3	San Bernardino County	93555	
China Lake Acres	1	Kern County		
Chinatown	1	San Francisco County	94108	
Chinese	1	Tuolumne County		
Chinese Camp	1	Tuolumne County	95309	
Chino	1	San Bernardino County	91708	10
Chino Hills	1	San Bernardino County	91709	
Chinowths Corner	1	Tulare County	93291	
Chipps	1	Solano County		
Chiquita	1	Sonoma County		
Chiriaco Summit	1	Riverside County	92201	
Chittenden	1	Santa Cruz County	95045	
Chloride City	1	Inyo County		
Cholame	1	San Luis Obispo County	93431	
Chorro	1	San Luis Obispo County		
Chowchilla	1	Madera County	93610	
Chrisman	1	Ventura County		
Christie	1	Contra Costa County		
Christie Spur	1	Humboldt County		
Chrome	1	Glenn County	95963	
Chualar	1	Monterey County	93925	
Chubbuck	1	San Bernardino County		
Chula Vista	1	San Diego County	91909	15
Chula Vista Junction	1	San Diego County		
Church of God Colony	1	Fresno County	93648	
Cienega	1	Los Angeles County		
Cima	1	San Bernardino County	92323	
Cinco	1	Kern County		
Cincotta	1	Fresno County		
Circle Oaks	1	Napa County		
Cisco	1	Placer County	95728	
Cisco Grove	1	Placer County		
Citro	1	Tulare County		
Citro Junction	1	Tulare County		
Citrona	1	Yolo County		
Citrus	1	Los Angeles County		
Citrus	1	Sacramento County		
Citrus Heights	1	Sacramento County	95610	21
City Hall	1	San Francisco County	94102	
City of Commerce	1	Los Angeles County	90022	
City of Industry	1	Los Angeles County	91715	
City Ranch	1	Los Angeles County	93551	
City Terrace	1	Los Angeles County	90063	
Civic Center	1	Los Angeles County	91401	
Clairemont	1	San Diego County		
Clam Beach	1	Humboldt County	95521	
Claraville	1	Kern County		
Clare Mill	1	Mendocino County		
Claremont	1	Los Angeles County	91711	
Clarksburg	1	Yolo County	95612	
Clarksville	1	El Dorado County	95682	
Claussenius	1	El Dorado County		
Clay	1	Sacramento County	95638	
Clay Number One	1	Amador County		
Clayton	1	Contra Costa County	94517	
Clayton	1	Placer County		
Clear Creek	1	Lassen County	96137	
Clear Creek	1	Siskiyou County	96039	
Clear Creek Junction	1	Plumas County		
Clearing House	1	Mariposa County		
Clearlake	1	Lake County	95422	
Clearlake Highlands	1	Lake County	95422	
Clearlake Highlands-Clearlake Park	1	Lake County		
Clearlake Oaks	1	Lake County	95423	
Clearlake Park	1	Lake County	95424	
Clements	1	San Joaquin County	95227	
Cleone	1	Mendocino County	95437	
Cliff Haven	1	Orange County		
Cliffside	1	Santa Cruz County		
Clifton	1	Los Angeles County	90277	
Clima	1	Solano County		
Clint	1	Fresno County		
Clinter	1	Fresno County	93703	
Clinton	1	Amador County	95642	
Clio	1	Plumas County	96106	
Clippergap	1	Placer County	95603	
Clipper Gap	1	Placer County	95603	
Clipper Mills	1	Butte County	95930	
Clotho	1	Fresno County		
Cloverdale	1	Shasta County	96007	
Cloverdale	1	Sonoma County	95425	
Clover Flat	1	San Diego County		
Clovis	1	Fresno County	93612	
Clyde	1	Contra Costa County	94520	
Coachella	1	Riverside County	92236	
Coalinga	1	Fresno County	93210	
Coarsegold	1	Madera County	93614	
Cobb	1	Lake County	95426	
Cobble	1	Colusa County		
Coburn	1	Monterey County		
Cochrane	1	San Joaquin County		
Cockatoo Grove	1	San Diego County		
Coddingtown	1	Sonoma County	95406	
Codora	1	Glenn County	95970	
Codora Four Corners	1	Glenn County		
Codorniz	1	Orange County		
Coffee	1	Trinity County	96091	
Coffing	1	Sacramento County		
Cohala	1	Plumas County		
Cohasset	1	Butte County	95926	
Cold Fork	1	Tehama County		
Cold Springs	1	El Dorado County		
Cold Springs	1	Tuolumne County		
Cold Springs Rancheria	1	Fresno County	93667	
Cole	1	Los Angeles County	90046	
Coleville	1	Mono County	96107	
Colfax	1	Placer County	95713	
Colfax Spring	1	Tuolumne County		
Colima	1	Los Angeles County		
College Center	1	Kern County		
College City	1	Colusa County	95931	
College Gardens	1	Stanislaus County		
College Heights	1	Kern County	93305	
College Heights	1	San Bernardino County	91786	
College Heights	1	Santa Cruz County	95003	
College Park	1	Santa Clara County		
College Park	1	Ventura County	91360	
College Plaza	1	San Diego County	92056	
Collegeville	1	San Joaquin County	95206	
Collier	1	Contra Costa County		
Collier	1	Los Angeles County	91307	
Collierville	1	San Joaquin County	95220	
Collins	1	Napa County		
Collinsville	1	Solano County	94585	
Colma	1	San Mateo County	94014	
Coloma	1	El Dorado County	95613	
Colonia Independencia	1	Orange County		
Colonial	1	Sacramento County	95820	
Colonial Acres	1	Sacramento County		
Colonial Heights	1	Sacramento County		
Colonial Heights	1	San Joaquin County		
Colonial Juarez	1	Orange County	92708	
Colonia Manzanillo	1	Orange County		
Colorado River Indian Reservation	2	Riverside County; San Bernardino County		
Colton	1	San Bernardino County	92324	
Columbia	1	Tuolumne County	95310	
Columbia Park	1	Contra Costa County		
Columbus	1	Kern County	93306	
Colusa	1	Colusa County	95932	
Colusa Rancheria	1	Colusa County		
Cometa	1	San Joaquin County		
Commerce	1	Los Angeles County	90040	
Commonwealth	1	Orange County	92632	
Como	1	Orange County		
Comptche	1	Mendocino County	95427	
Compton	1	Los Angeles County	90220	24
Compton East	1	Los Angeles County	90221	
Compton West	1	Los Angeles County	90220	
Conant	1	Shasta County		
Concord	1	Contra Costa County	94518	27
Concow	1	Butte County		
Conejo	1	Fresno County	93662	
Confidence	1	Tuolumne County	95370	
Constantia	1	Lassen County		
Convict Lake	1	Mono County	93514	
Cooks Valley	1	Humboldt County		
Cool	1	El Dorado County	95614	
Cool Water	1	San Bernardino County		
Cooper	1	Lake County		
Cooper	1	Monterey County		
Coopers Corner	1	San Joaquin County	95220	
Cooperstown	1	Stanislaus County		
Copco	1	Modoc County		
Copco	1	Siskiyou County	96044	
Copper City	1	Glenn County		
Copper City	1	San Bernardino County		
Copperopolis	1	Calaveras County	95228	
Coram	1	Shasta County		
Corbin Village	1	Los Angeles County	91364	
Corcoran	1	Kings County	93212	
Cordelia	1	Solano County	94585	
Cordelia Junction	1	Solano County		
Cordero Junction	1	Solano County		
Cordova	1	Sacramento County		
Cordova Town West	1	Sacramento County	95827	
Cornell	1	Los Angeles County	91301	
Cornell	1	Modoc County		
Corning	1	Tehama County	96021	
Coromar	1	Santa Barbara County		
Corona	1	Riverside County	92877	83
Corona del Mar	1	Orange County	92625	
Coronado	1	San Diego County	92118	
Coronet	1	Los Angeles County		
Coronita	1	Riverside County	92882	
Corporal	1	Santa Clara County		
Corralitos	1	Santa Cruz County	95076	
Corte Madera	1	Marin County	94925	
Cortez	1	Merced County		
Cortina Rancheria	1	Colusa County	95987	
Cory	1	Glenn County		
Coso Junction	1	Inyo County	93542	
Costa Mesa	1	Orange County	92626	28
Cosumne	1	Sacramento County		
Cosy Dell	1	San Bernardino County		
Cotati	1	Sonoma County	94931	
Cotners Corner	1	San Bernardino County	92307	
Coto de Caza	1	Orange County	92679	
Cottage Corners	1	San Benito County	95023	
Cottage Gardens	1	Stanislaus County		
Cottage Grove	1	Siskiyou County		
Cottage Springs	1	Calaveras County		
Cotton Center	1	Tulare County	93257	
Cottonwood	1	Shasta County	96022	
Cougar	1	Siskiyou County		
Coulterville	1	Mariposa County	95311	
Counsman	1	Sutter County		
Country Club	1	San Joaquin County		
Country Club Estates	1	San Luis Obispo County	93401	
Country Modern	1	Kern County	93501	
County Strip	1	Los Angeles County	90069	
Court	1	Contra Costa County	94553	
Courtland	1	Sacramento County	95615	
Covelo	1	Mendocino County	95428	
Covina	1	Los Angeles County	91722	24
Covington Mill	1	Trinity County	96052	
Cowan Heights	1	Orange County	92705	
Cow Creek	1	Tuolumne County		
Cowell	1	Contra Costa County	94520	
Cox	1	Riverside County		
Coyote	1	Santa Clara County	95013	
Coyote Valley Indian Reservation	1	Mendocino County		
Coyote Valley Rancheria	1	Mendocino County		
Coyoteville	1	El Dorado County		
Coyote Wells	1	Imperial County		
Crabtree	1	Fresno County		
Craf	1	San Bernardino County	92359	
Crafton	1	San Bernardino County	92359	
Cragmont	1	Alameda County		
Cranmore	1	Sutter County		
Crannell	1	Humboldt County		
Crater	1	Inyo County		
Cray Mill	1	Mono County		
Crayold	1	Fresno County		
Creal	1	Kern County		
Creed	1	Solano County		
Creegan	1	Merced County		
Crenshaw	1	Los Angeles County	90008	
Crenshaw-Imperial	1	Los Angeles County	90310	
Crescent	1	Los Angeles County	90213	
Crescent City	1	Del Norte County	95531	
Crescent City North	1	Del Norte County		
Crescent Mills	1	Plumas County	95934	
Crescent North	1	Del Norte County	95531	
Cressey	1	Merced County	95312	
Crest	1	San Diego County	92021	
Crest Forest	1	San Bernardino County		
Crestline	1	San Bernardino County	92325	
Crestmore	1	Riverside County		
Crestmore	1	San Bernardino County	92316	
Crestmore Heights	1	Riverside County	92509	
Creston	1	Napa County		
Creston	1	San Luis Obispo County	93432	
Crest Park	1	San Bernardino County	92326	
Crestview	1	Mono County	93514	
C-Road	1	Plumas County		
Crockett	1	Contra Costa County	94525	
Croft	1	El Dorado County		
Cromberg	1	Plumas County	96103	
Cronese Valley	1	San Bernardino County		
Cross Roads	1	San Bernardino County	92242	
Crowley	1	Mendocino County		
Crowley	1	Tulare County	93291	
Crowley Lake	1	Mono County	93546	
Crown	1	Sonoma County		
Crown Jewel	1	San Bernardino County		
Crown Point	1	San Diego County		
Crows Landing	1	Stanislaus County	95313	
Crucero	1	San Bernardino County		
Crutcher	1	Los Angeles County	90723	
Crystalaire	1	Los Angeles County	93544	
Crystal Cove	1	Orange County	92651	
Cudahy	1	Los Angeles County	90201	
Cudahy	1	San Diego County		
Cuesta-by-the-Sea	1	San Luis Obispo County	93401	
Culp	1	Shasta County		
Culver City	1	Los Angeles County	90230	33
Culver Junc	1	Los Angeles County		
Cummings	1	Mendocino County	95477	
Cunard	1	Sutter County		
Cunningham	1	Sonoma County	95472	
Cupertino	1	Santa Clara County	95014	
Curry Village	1	Mariposa County	95389	
Curtis	1	Siskiyou County		
Curtiss Heights	1	Humboldt County	95521	
Curtner	1	Alameda County		
Cushenbury	1	San Bernardino County		
Cushing	1	San Luis Obispo County		
Cutler	1	Tulare County	93615	
Cutten	1	Humboldt County	95534	
Cuttings Wharf	1	Napa County		
Cuyama	1	Santa Barbara County	93214	
Cuyapaipe Indian Reservation	1	San Diego County	92048	
Cygnus	1	Solano County		
Cypress	1	Orange County	90630	
Cypress South	1	Orange County	90630	
