= Deer Creek (Tehama County, California) =

Deer Creek Arroyo de los Venados, Rio de los Venados
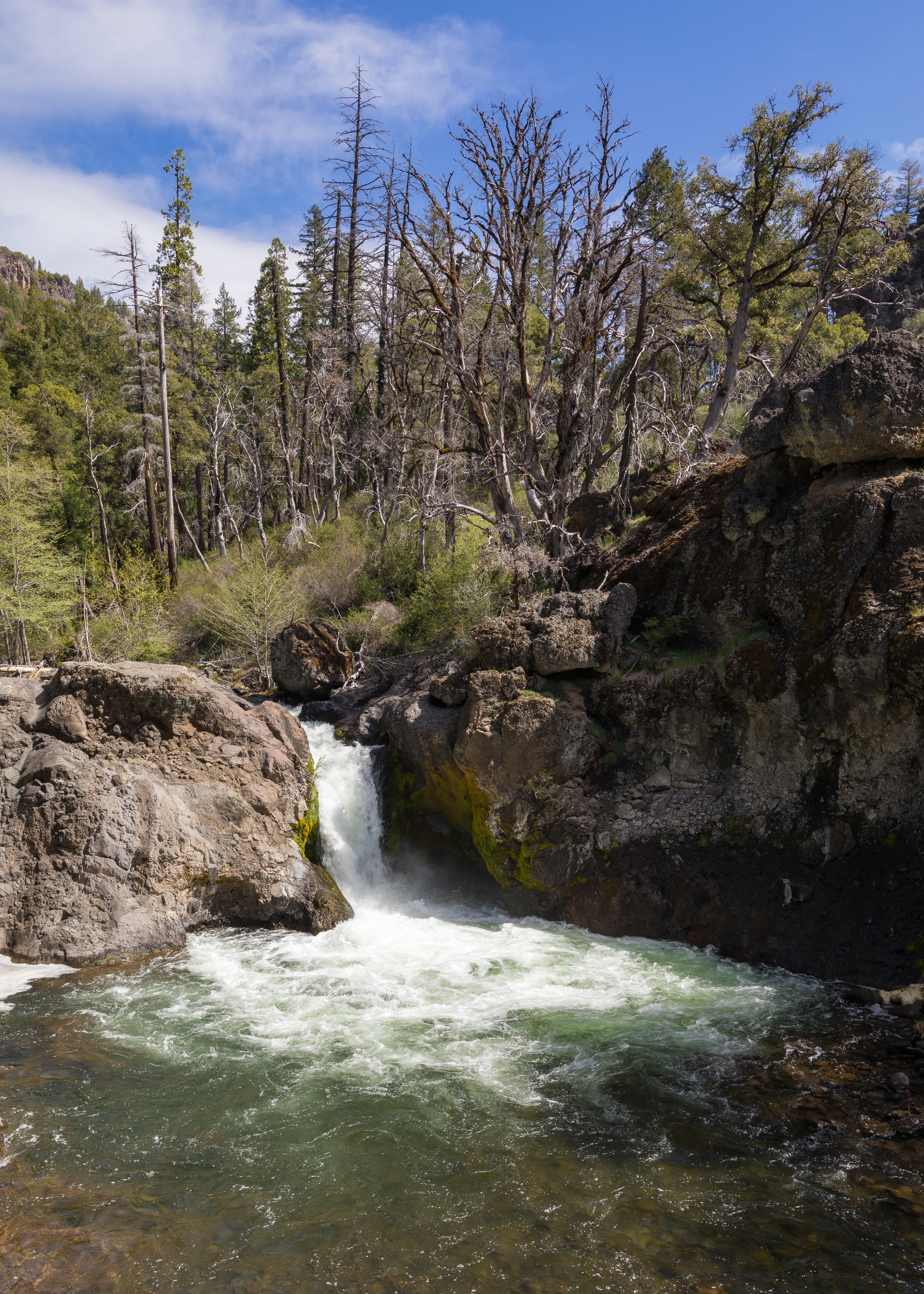
- Upper Deer Creek Falls in April 2020.

- Location of the mouth in California

Location
- Country: United States
- State: California
- Region: Tehama County
- Cities: Childs Meadows, Vina

Physical characteristics
- Source: North slope of Butt Mountain
  - location: Lassen National Forest
  - coordinates: 40°12′44″N 121°22′31″W
  - elevation: 7,320 ft (2,230 m)
- Mouth: Sacramento River
  - location: One mile west of Vina, California
  - coordinates: 39°55′35″N 122°04′54″W
  - elevation: 180 ft (55 m)

Basin features
- Tributaries
  - right: Lost Creek, Gurnsey Creek

Deer Creek is a 60-mile-long (97 km) southwestward-flowing stream in Northern California that flows through Tehama County, California. It is an eastside tributary of the Sacramento River. As one of only three remaining Sacramento River tributaries supporting native runs of the genetically distinct Central Valley spring-run Chinook salmon, it is a stronghold for this state and federally endangered fish as well as other salmonids.

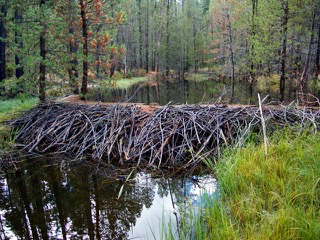
Beaver dam on Gurnsey Creek, just below Childs Meadows, Tehama County, California. Credit Brock Dolman, OAEC

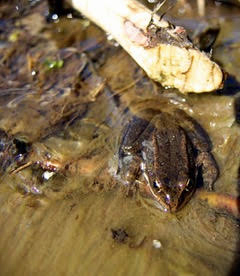
Cascades frog and beaver-chewed stick on Gurnsey Creek, tributary of Deer Creek, Tehama County, California. Credit Brock Dolman, OAEC

== History ==
Now Deer Creek flows through the Ishi Wilderness, named for Ishi, the last member of the Native American Yana or Yahi people who had originally lived in the area. The Spanish had named what was later translated to Deer Creek, Arroyo de los Venados or Rio de los Venados, after the immense deer herd that lived in the region. Black-tailed deer (Odocoileus hemionus columbianus) still thrive in the Deer Creek watershed and are a part of the large Tehama deer herd that at one time numbered 100,000.

== Watershed and course ==
Deer Creek and its tributaries drain 229 square miles (590 km^{2}). The creek flows roughly southwest for most of its 60-mile (97 km) length. Its headwaters are in Lassen National Forest at an elevation of 7,320 feet (2,230 m) on Butt Mountain in the southern Cascade Range, several miles (9 km) west of Lake Almanor. The creek's upper reaches are through meadows and dense forests. The Lost Creek tributary sources in Lake Wilson and joins Deer Creek along Highway 89, as does Gurnsey Creek (also known as North Fork Deer Creek). After leaving these meadows and broader valleys, Deer Creek flows through a steep rock canyon until it reaches the Sacramento Valley. About 11 miles (18 km) after entering the valley, it joins the Sacramento River at an elevation of only 180 feet (55 m), about 7 miles (11 km) south-southeast of the small city of Tehama, California.

Two natural falls are located in the upper Deer Creek watershed: Lower and Upper Deer Creek Falls. Lower Deer Creek Falls has a functioning but sub-standard fish ladder. Upper Deer Creek Falls represents the natural limit of anadromy for spring-run Chinook salmon, and although it also has a fish ladder, it is no longer opened in the spring as it was historically. While the upper watershed is public land primarily in the Lassen National Forest, there are large private ranches in the mid- and lower-elevation areas.

The creek has four diversions in its lower reaches, all occurring after the stream flows into the Sacramento Valley. Three use diversion dams and one uses a ditch. There are no storage dams on the creek. Except for the diversions, Deer Creek is still relatively natural, largely because the upper two-thirds of the creek flow through protected land in the Lassen National Forest.

== Ecology and habitat ==
In addition, Deer Creek is a refugial stronghold for spring-run Chinook salmon (Oncorhynchus tshawytscha), and the stream supports Central Valley anadromous steelhead trout (Oncorhynchus mykiss), fall-run Chinook salmon, late-fall-run Chinook salmon, and Pacific lamprey (Entosphenus tridentatus). Historically, spring-run Chinook salmons populations averaged around 2,800, but numbers began to decline in the 1980s to the low hundreds.

The Sierra Meadows Partnership is studying the ecological impact, including carbon storage related to montane meadow restoration, including on the Childs Meadows portion of Gurnsey Creek, an upper Deer Creek tributary. Scientists Kelli Franson and Kristen Podolak are evaluating the changes in the meadow after restriction of cattle from the riparian zone, along with construction of beaver dam analogues (BDAs). Species of particular concern in the region include the great gray owl (Strix nebulosa), willow flycatcher (Empidonax traillii), and greater sandhill crane (Antigone canadensis), all dependent on riparian habitat which has been largely degraded or lost due to overgrazing or development in California. A 2015 bird survey by Point Blue Conservation Science found four to ten times more meadow birds species richness and abundance in natural versus degraded meadows, including Gurnsey Creek's Childs Meadows and Carter (Creek) Meadow in the Deer Creek watershed. The 290-acre (117 ha) Childs Meadows is one of the few remaining strongholds for willow flycatcher and the Cascades frog (Rana cascadae) which is now absent from 50% of its former range in California.

Vernal pools are a relatively unique habitat in the lower watershed, reduced to 5% of their original range in California. A large vernal pools complex exists on Nature Conservancy Vina Plains Reserve.

== Recreation ==
Deer Creek is also an excellent fishing location. It is one of a decreasing number of streams in California that still provides habitat for the native trout and migrating salmon.

== See also ==
- List of rivers of California
