= Casa Loma (disambiguation) =

Casa Loma may refer to:

- Casa Loma (neighbourhood), in Toronto
- Casa Loma, Kern County, California
- Casa Loma, Placer County, California
- Casa Loma, Santa Clara County, California

== See also ==
- Casa Loma, a historic house in Toronto, Canada.
- Casa Loma Hotel, hotel on historic Route 66 in Tulsa County, Oklahoma
- Casa Loma Hotel in Redlands, California
