= Curtner =

Curtner may refer to:

- Curtner, Fremont, California, a neighborhood of Fremont in Alameda County, California
- Curtner (VTA), a light rail station in San Jose, California

== People with the surname ==
- Jack Curtner (1888–1961), American racing driver
