= Castle Hot Springs =

Castle Hot Springs may refer to:

- Castle Hot Springs, California, an unincorporated community in Lake County, California
- Castle Hot Springs (Arizona), a historic resort in Arizona, located in the Hieroglyphic Mountains, north of Phoenix
