= Shipyard Acres, California =

Unincorporated community in California, United States

Shipyard Acres
- unincorporated community
- Location in California Shipyard Acres (the United States)
- Coordinates: 38°15′36″N 122°16′16″W
- Country: United States
- State: California
- County: Napa
- Elevation: 33 ft (10 m)

Shipyard Acres was an unincorporated community in Napa County, California, United States. It lies at an elevation of 33 feet (10 m). Shipyard Acres is located 2.5 miles (4.0 km) south-southeast of Napa.

== History ==
Shipyard Acres was a wartime neighborhood with a peak population of over 2,550. Residents lived in nearly 400 plywood houses that were built to primarily house families of workers involved in building a variety of ships at Basalt Rock Company for the World War II effort. Other residents worked at Mare Island Naval Shipyard, Napa State Hospital, Travis Air Force Base, the Benicia Arsenal as well as other private industries. Many residents of the development had moved from Arkansas, Oklahoma, Missouri and Texas as well as other states in order to seek employment. The development sprang up in 1943 and was dismantled in the mid-1950s. It was located at the northwest corner of what is now Kaiser Road and Napa-Vallejo Highway. Some of the structures were moved a few miles west to the Cuttings Wharf area, resurrected, and were still in place until 2012.
