= Carmel Point, California =

Unincorporated area south of Carmel-by-the-Sea, California

Carmel Point Point Loeb Charles King Van Riper Reamer's Point
- Unincorporated community
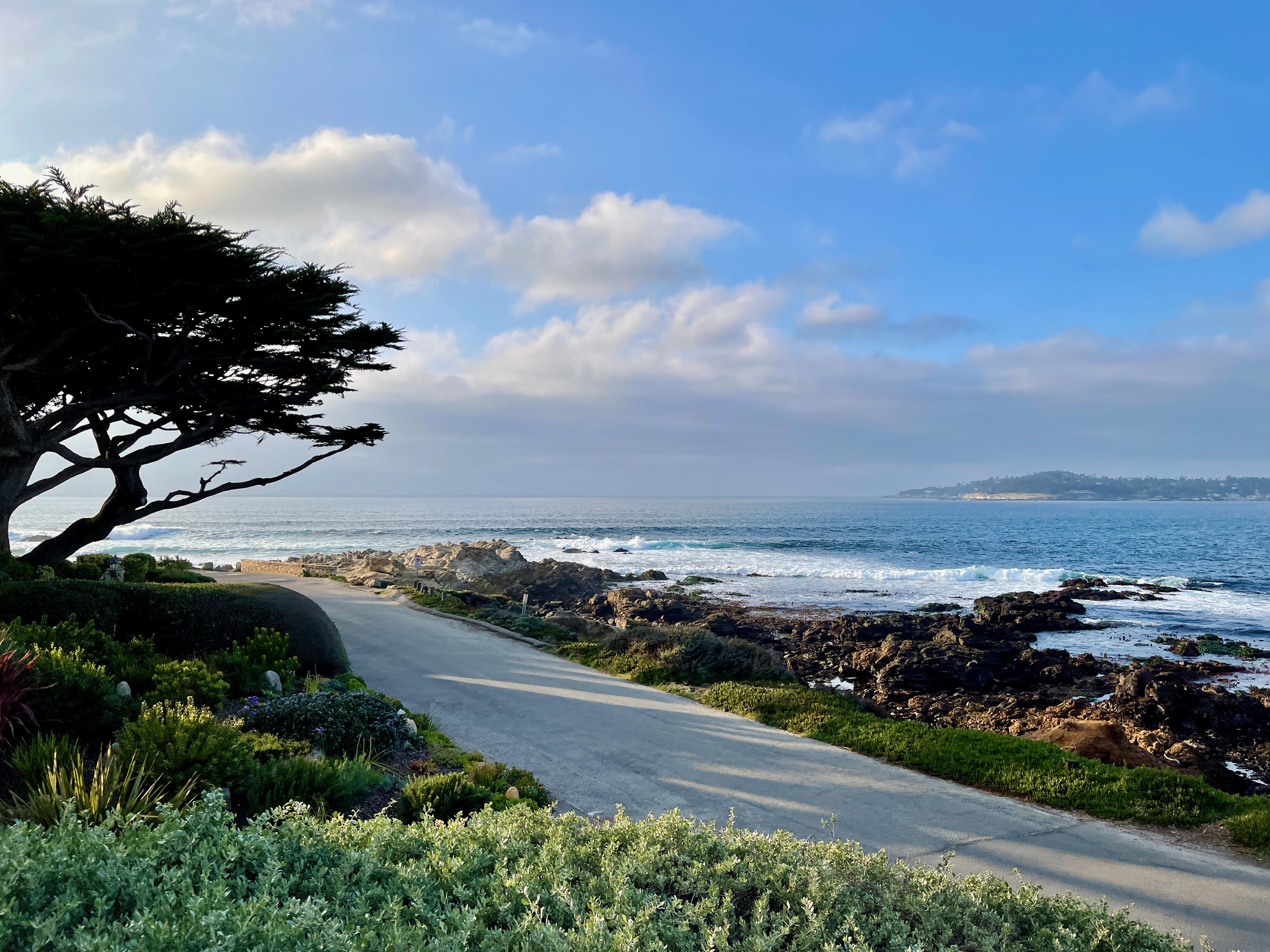
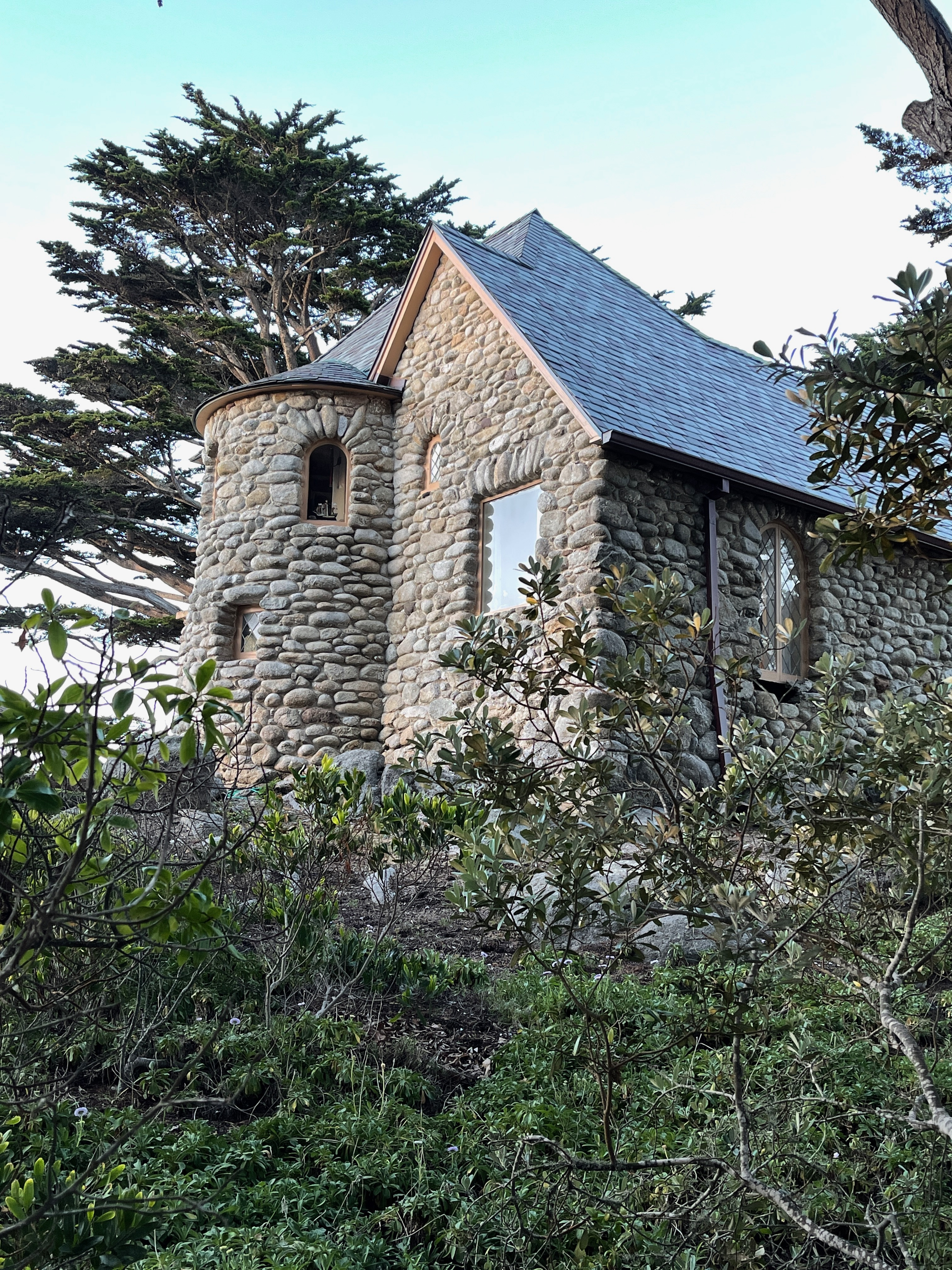
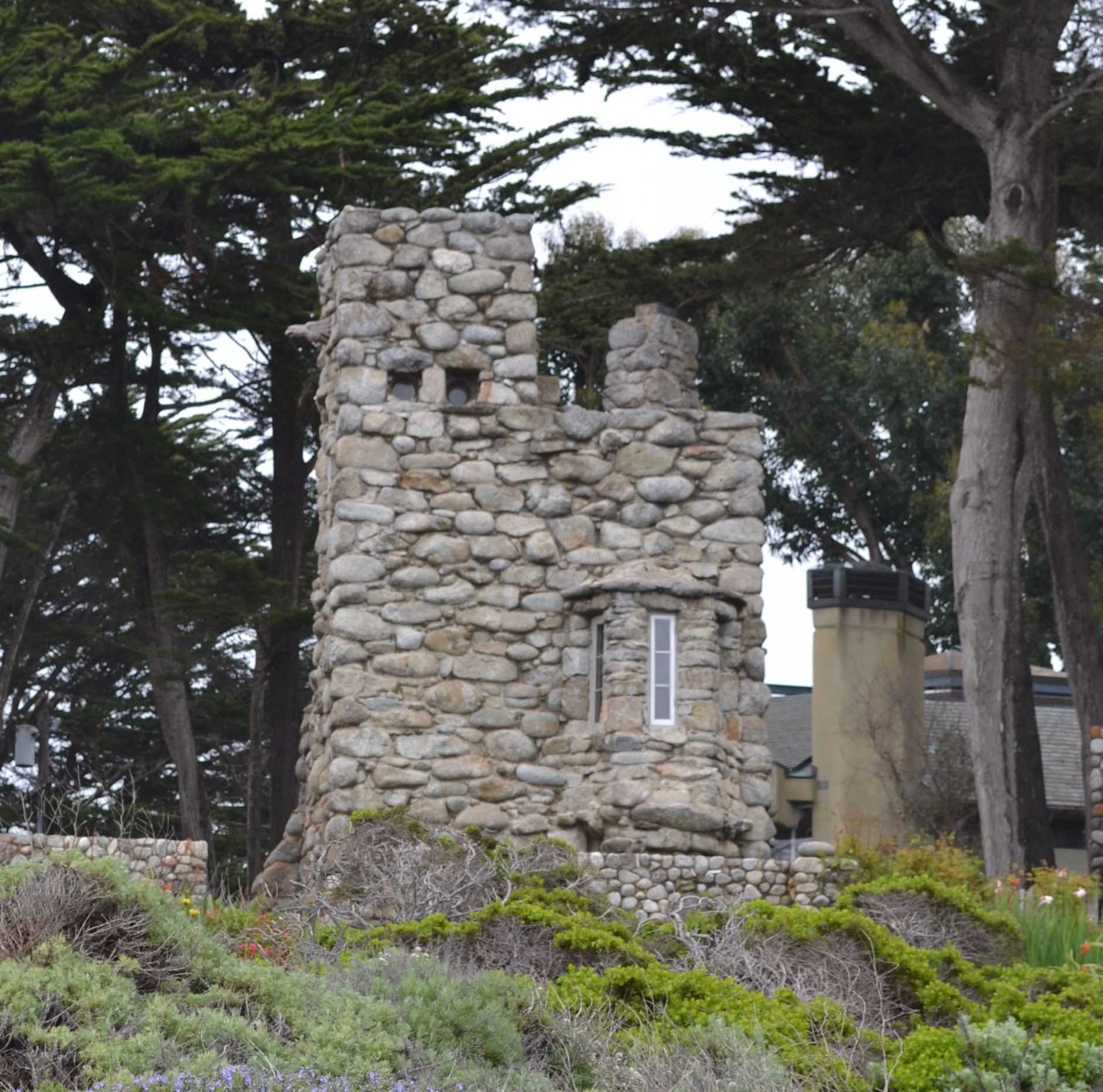
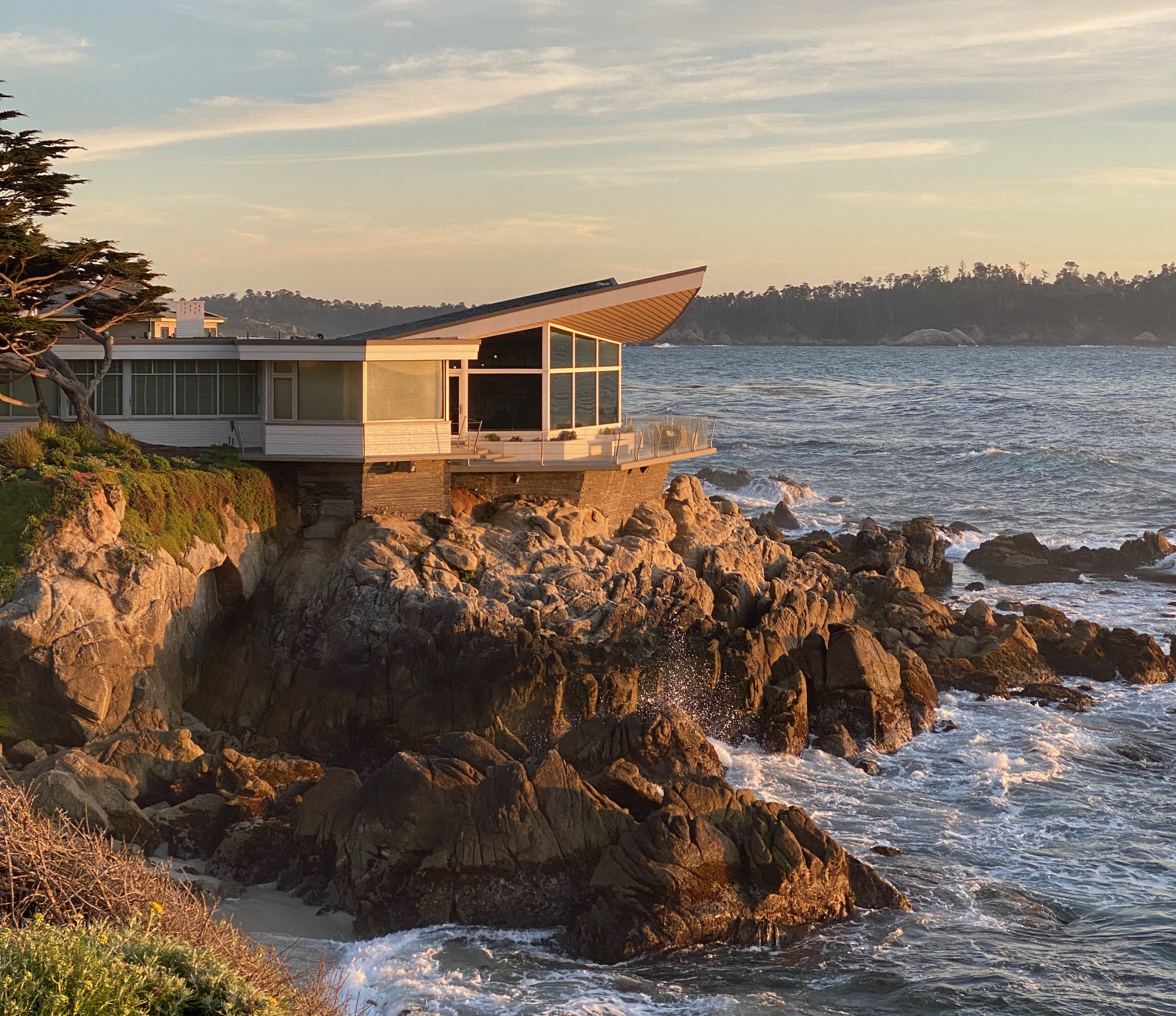
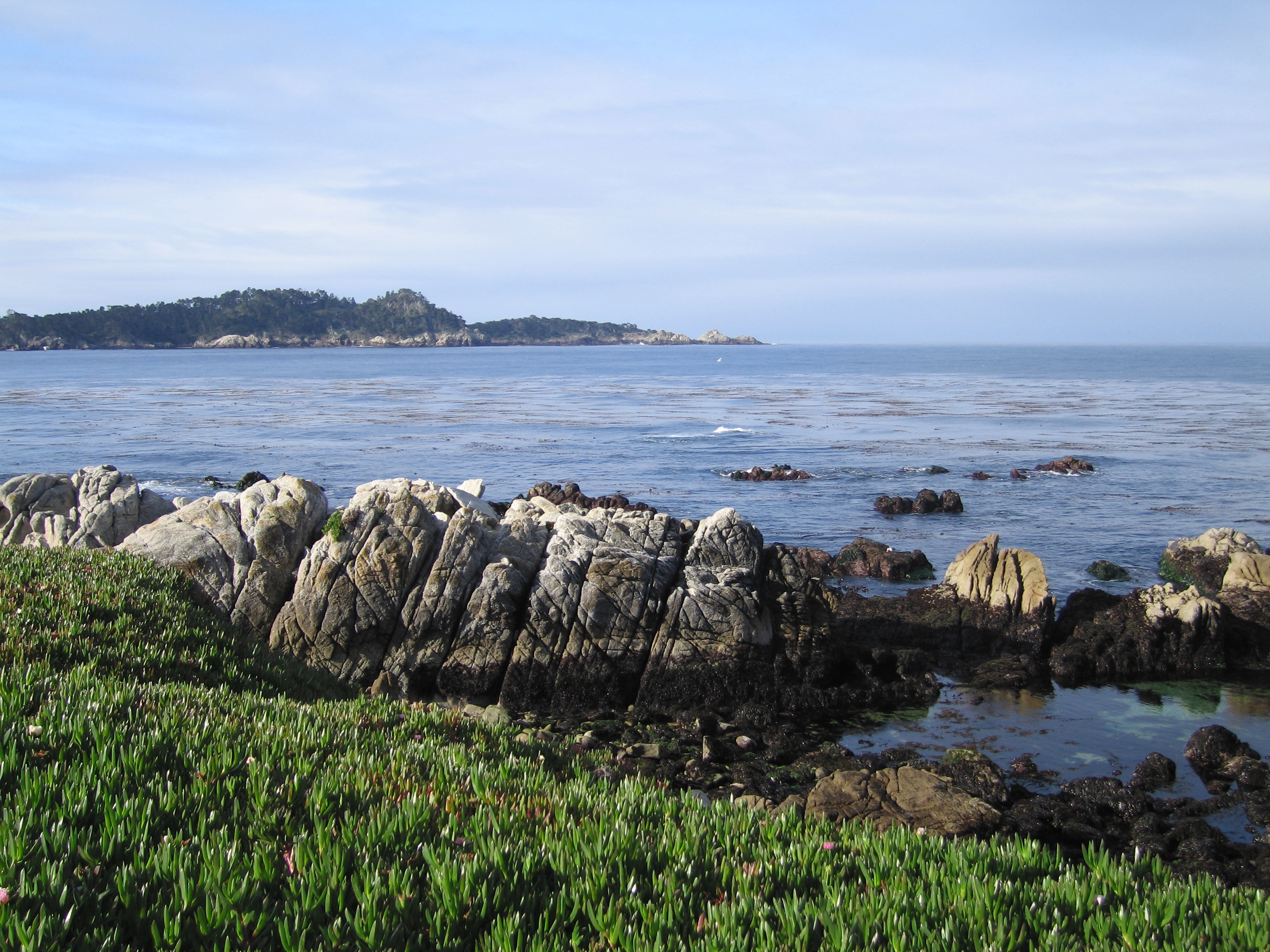
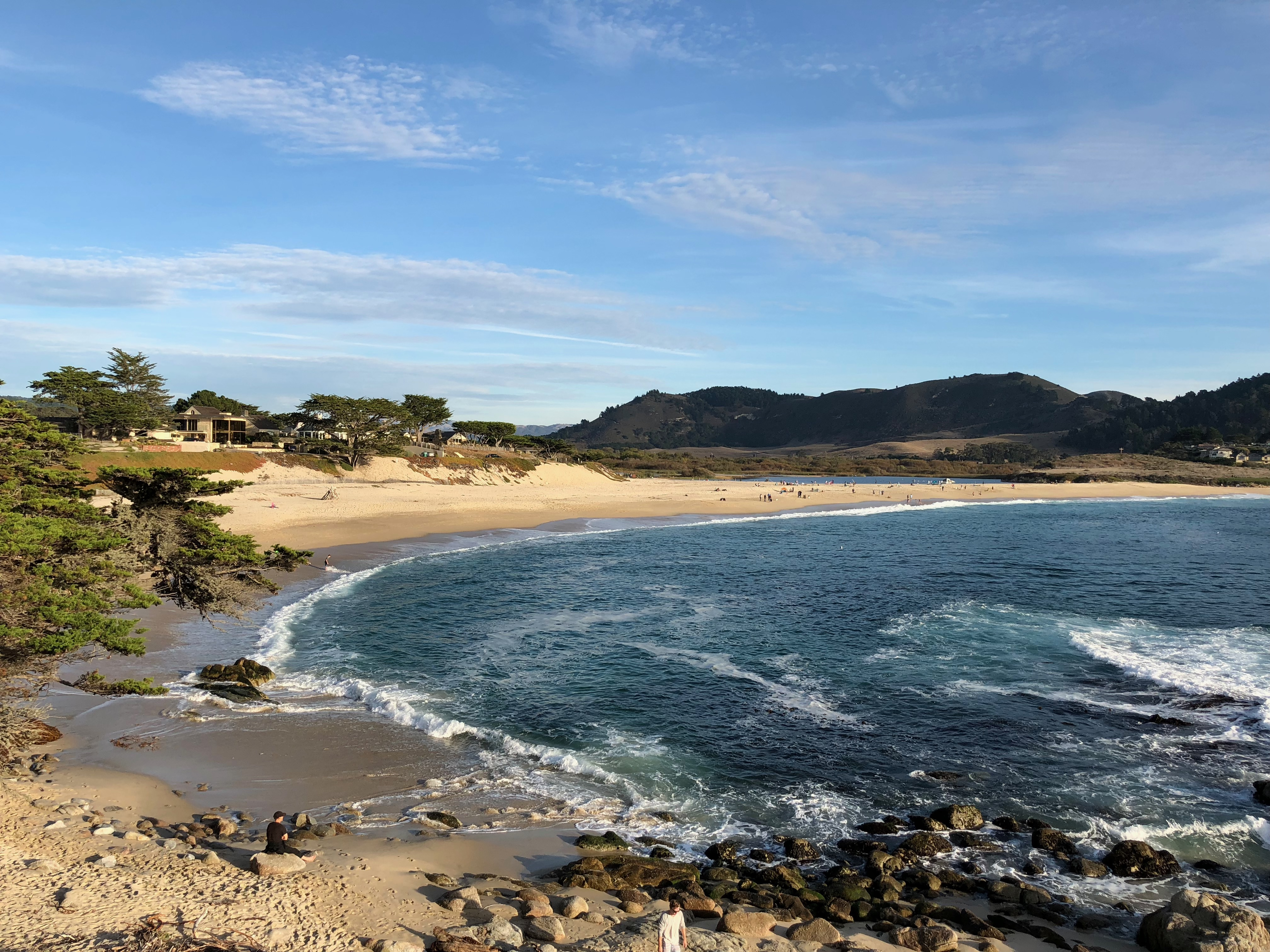
- From top, left to right: Scenic Road, Edward G. Kuster's House; Tor House; Butterfly House; Rock formation; Carmel River Beach

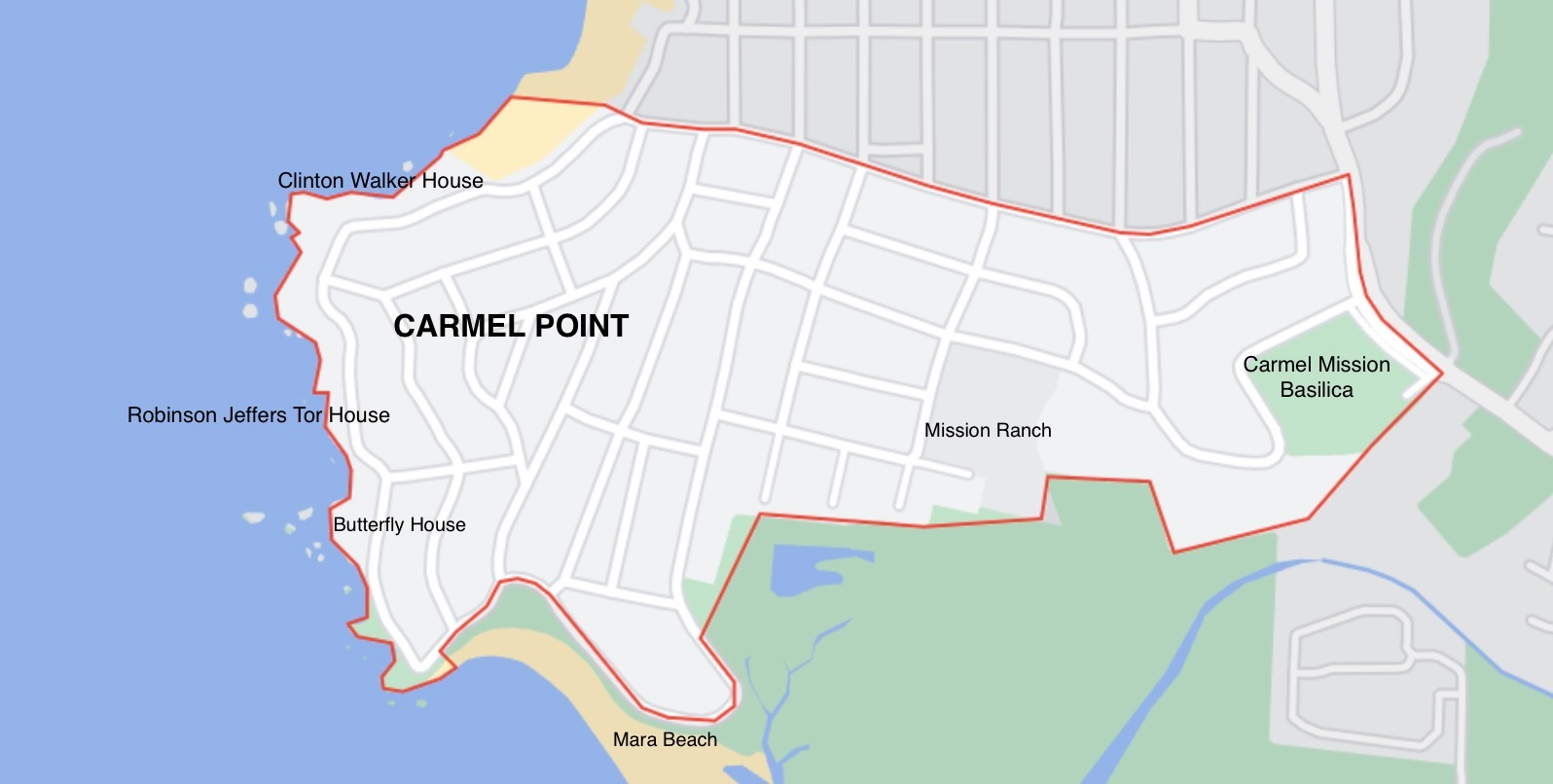

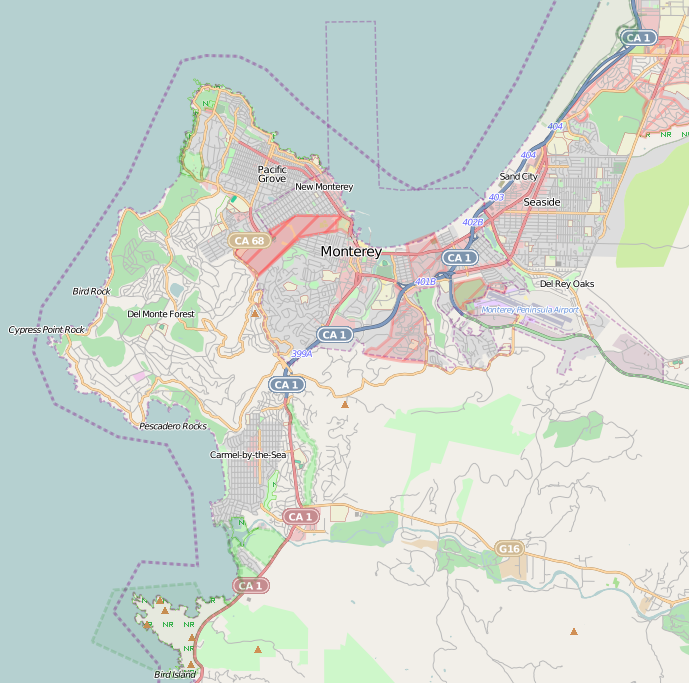
- Location in Monterey County Carmel Point (California)
- Coordinates: 36°32′37″N 121°55′59″W
- Country: United States
- State: California
- County: Monterey County
- Established: ca. 1902
- Elevation: 36 ft (11 m)
- Time zone: UTC-8 (PST)
  - Summer (DST): UTC-7 (PDT)
- GNIS feature ID: 254713

Carmel Point also known as the Point and formerly called Point Loeb and Reamer's Point, is an unincorporated community in Monterey County, California, United States. It is a cape located at the southern city limits of Carmel-by-the-Sea and offers views of Carmel Bay, the mouth of Carmel River, and Point Lobos. Carmel Point was one of three major land developments adjacent to the Carmel city limits between 1922 and 1925. The other two were Hatton Fields, 233 acres (94 ha) between the eastern town limit and Highway 1, and Carmel Woods, 125 acres (51 ha) tract on the north side.

== History ==
The Carmel Point began with the Rumsen Ohlone Native American tribe, who inhabited the area in the 6th-century. The Spanish explorers and missionaries arrived in the late 18th century and erected, within the Ohlone region, the Mission San Carlos Borroméo de Carmelo (founded in 1770). In 1834, the Mexican land grant ranchos took over the mission land and property. In 1848, Mexico ceded to California as a result of the Mexican–American War.

== Geography ==
The Carmel Point land is hilly to the east, but flat to the west, which is closest to the Carmel Bay. The highest point in the vicinity is 1,768.37 ft (539.00 m) high and is 18.7 ft (5.7 m) southeast of Carmel Point. There are about 23 people per square kilometer in Carmel Point's relatively small population. The nearest larger town is Seaside, California, which is 6.46 mi (10.40 km) northeast of Carmel Point.

== Climate ==
Climate data for Carmel Point
Month	Jan	Feb	Mar	Apr	May	Jun	Jul	Aug	Sep	Oct	Nov	Dec	Year
Mean daily maximum °F (°C)	60.1 (15.6)	61.0 (16.1)	64.0 (17.8)	64.9 (18.3)	66.9 (19.4)	68.0 (20.0)	70.0 (21.1)	71.1 (21.7)	70.0 (21.1)	64.0 (17.8)	62.1 (16.7)	60.1 (15.6)	65.1 (18.4)
Mean daily minimum °F (°C)	43.0 (6.1)	45.0 (7.2)	46.9 (8.3)	48.0 (8.9)	50.0 (10.0)	52.0 (11.1)	53.1 (11.7)	53.1 (11.7)	51.1 (10.6)	46.9 (8.3)	46.0 (7.8)	43.0 (6.1)	48.2 (9.0)
Average precipitation inches (mm)	4.19 (106)	3.75 (95)	3.53 (90)	1.48 (38)	0.50 (13)	0.20 (5.1)	0.09 (2.3)	0.11 (2.8)	0.28 (7.1)	1.06 (27)	2.43 (62)	2.73 (69)	20.35 (517)

== See also ==
- List of places in California
- Timeline of Carmel-by-the-Sea, California
- Historic Homes in Carmel Point
