= SS Cabrillo =

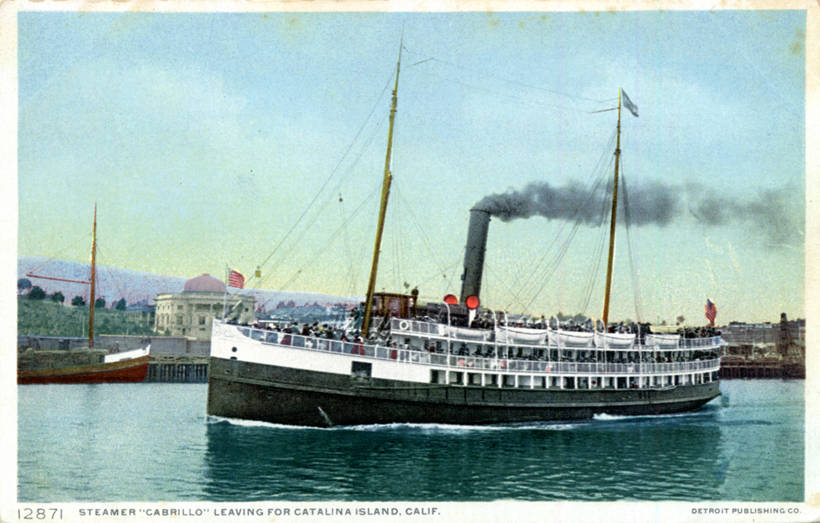
- Cabrillo

History

United States
- Name: SS Cabrillo
- Namesake: Juan Rodríguez Cabrillo
- Owner: Wilmington Transportation Company (1904-1950); Chuck Moore (1950-Abandonment)
- Builder: William Muller
- Cost: $250,000 (1904)
- Launched: February 15, 1904
- Maiden voyage: July 4, 1904
- Nickname(s): “Queen of the South Coast”
- Fate: Abandoned, 1950

General characteristics
- Type: Passenger ship
- Displacement: 564 tn
- Length: 194 ft
- Beam: 32 ft
- Draft: 11 ft
- Depth: 15.5 ft
- Capacity: 1,200 passengers

The SS Cabrillo was a wooden passenger steamship operating in Los Angeles County, California, during the first half of the 20th century. The steamship provided transportation between the Port of Los Angeles and the ports of Avalon and Two Harbors on Santa Catalina Island.

== Passenger ferry use ==
The Banning brothers of Wilmington, who owned the Wilmington Transportation Company and provided the steamships used to deliver tourists from Los Angeles to the island's city of Avalon, bought the island in 1892.

Realizing the need for more luxuriously appointed vessels on the route, the smaller SS Hermosa II was already under construction, but a decision was reached to next commission a larger ship for the growing number of tourists wishing to visit the island.

The SS Cabrillo was built for the Bannings by shipbuilder William Muller for a cost of nearly $250,000, launched on February 15, 1904, and made her first voyage to Catalina on July 4 of the same year to much fanfare. Nicknamed "The Queen of the South Coast," the 194-foot steamship could carry 1,200 passengers from San Pedro Harbor.

Built of Oregon fir and protected by copper plates, the Cabrillo hosted 12 state rooms, 10 crew rooms, a social room, teak and mahogany finishes, and the ability to provide food service to guests.

While large for a wood-hulled ferry of that era, need would require the Cabrillo be superseded by the larger, steel-hulled SS Avalon and SS Catalina in the Wilmington Transportation Company fleet.

== World War II ==
With the outbreak of World War II, the island was taken over by the U.S. military, and the ships of the Wilmington Transportation Company were conscripted as well. The SS Avalon was left behind for limited transportation to and from the mainland, while the SS Catalina and SS Cabrillo were taken to San Francisco to serve as troop transports for the San Francisco Port of Embarkation.

After the war ended, the SS Catalina was sent back to be used for ferry services to and from the island, while the Cabrillo continued to be utilized by the U.S. Army, who operated her until around 1947.

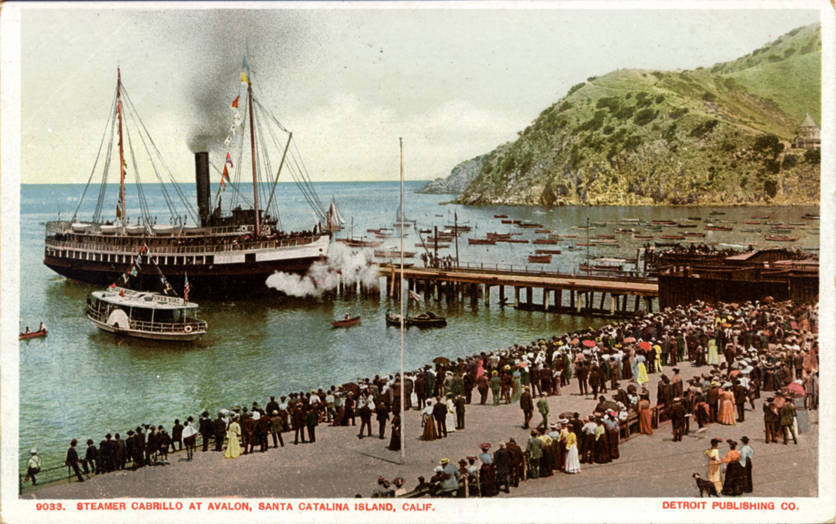
Steamer Cabrillo at Avalon

== Current state ==
The SS Cabrillo was put up for sale and subsequently purchased sometime between 1947 and 1950 for use in Northern California as a hospitality establishment, however these plans were unsuccessful. Having been stripped of all machinery and other useful equipment, she was scuttled at Cuttings Wharf on the shores of the Napa River, beginning the final chapter of her life. In the following years, salvage operations continued until the vessel was abandoned, and today, little is left but the hull.

== In popular culture ==
The SS Cabrillo made a feature film appearance, along with Gary Cooper, Broderick Crawford, and David Niven, in The Real Glory, where she was outfitted with a dummy, second smokestack during shooting.
