= Carmel Bay =

Bay of the Pacific Ocean off the coast of California, United States

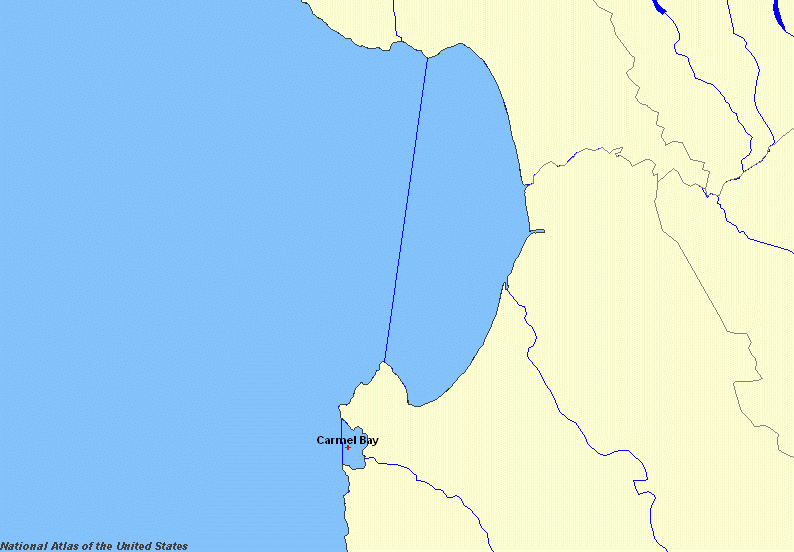
- Carmel Bay, labeled Note much larger Monterey Bay to its north Map per NationalAtlas.gov

- Location within California
- Location: Monterey County, California
- Coordinates: 36°32′36″N 121°57′17″W
- River sources: Carmel River
- Ocean/sea sources: Pacific Ocean
- Basin countries: United States
- Max. length: 4 miles (6.4 km)
- Max. width: 2 miles (3.2 km)
- Settlements: Carmel-by-the-Sea, California

Carmel Bay is a bay of the Pacific Ocean, along the central coast of California in Monterey County. The bay is 4 mi (6.4 km) long and 2 mi (3.2 km) wide with its mouth about 3 mi (4.8 km) across, between Point Carmel to the south and Point Cypress to the north; Monterey Bay is about four coastline miles north, with Point Pinos intervening.

The bay's coastline includes Carmel City Beach and Carmel River State Beach, with wildlife largely protected by the 'Carmel Bay Ecological Reserve'. The City of Carmel, formally "Carmel-by-the-Sea", adjoins Carmel Bay, with the cities of Monterey, Pacific Grove, California, and Santa Cruz about 5 mi (8.0 km), 4 mi (6.4 km), and 45 mi (72 km) north, respectively.

== Marine protected areas ==
Several areas in Carmel Bay have been designated marine protected areas under California's Marine Life Protection Act. 'Carmel Bay State Marine Conservation Area' (SMCA) is entirely underneath Carmel Bay, and both 'Carmel Pinnacles State Marine Reserve' (SMR) and 'Point Lobos State Marine Reserve' are partially underneath Carmel Bay.

Along with the immediately adjoining 'Point Lobos State Marine Conservation Area', nearly 17 square miles (44 km^{2}) of marine protected areas in the waters in and around Carmel Bay are like underwater parks, helping to conserve ocean wildlife and marine ecosystems. No living marine resources may be taken from these areas, except from 'Carmel Bay SMCA', and from there only recreational fishing for finfish and limited "by hand" commercial harvesting of giant kelp and bull kelp, by permit.

== Toponymy ==
The first Europeans to discover the bay were Spanish mariners led by Juan Rodriguez Cabrillo in 1542, sailing up the California coast without landing. In 1602, Spanish explorer Sebastián Vizcaíno named the nearby "Rio de Carmelo" to honor the three Carmelite priests on his expedition; the river empties into the bay, and so the names Carmelo and Carmel were later applied to the bay, a mission, the settlement, and other nearby features.

== Climate ==
The area around Carmel Bay experiences a cool summer Mediterranean climate (Köppen climate classification Csb) typical of coastal areas of California. The wet season is from October to May, and summers are often overcast, the sun blocked by marine layer clouds which can produce drizzle. September and October (Indian Summer) offer the best weather of the year, with an average high of 72 °F. The average annual rainfall in Carmel-by-the-Sea is 15 inches per year and the average temperature is 57 degrees F.

Climate data for Carmel-by-the-Sea
Month	Jan	Feb	Mar	Apr	May	Jun	Jul	Aug	Sep	Oct	Nov	Dec	Year
Mean daily maximum °C (°F)	15.6 (60.1)	16.1 (61.0)	17.8 (64.0)	18.3 (64.9)	19.4 (66.9)	20.0 (68.0)	21.1 (70.0)	21.7 (71.1)	21.1 (70.0)	17.8 (64.0)	16.7 (62.1)	15.6 (60.1)	18.4 (65.1)
Mean daily minimum °C (°F)	6.1 (43.0)	7.2 (45.0)	8.3 (46.9)	8.9 (48.0)	10.0 (50.0)	11.1 (52.0)	11.7 (53.1)	11.7 (53.1)	10.6 (51.1)	8.3 (46.9)	7.8 (46.0)	6.1 (43.0)	9.0 (48.2)
Average precipitation mm (inches)	106 (4.19)	95 (3.75)	90 (3.53)	38 (1.48)	13 (0.50)	5.1 (0.20)	2.3 (0.09)	2.8 (0.11)	7.1 (0.28)	27 (1.06)	62 (2.43)	69 (2.73)	517 (20.35)

== Gallery ==
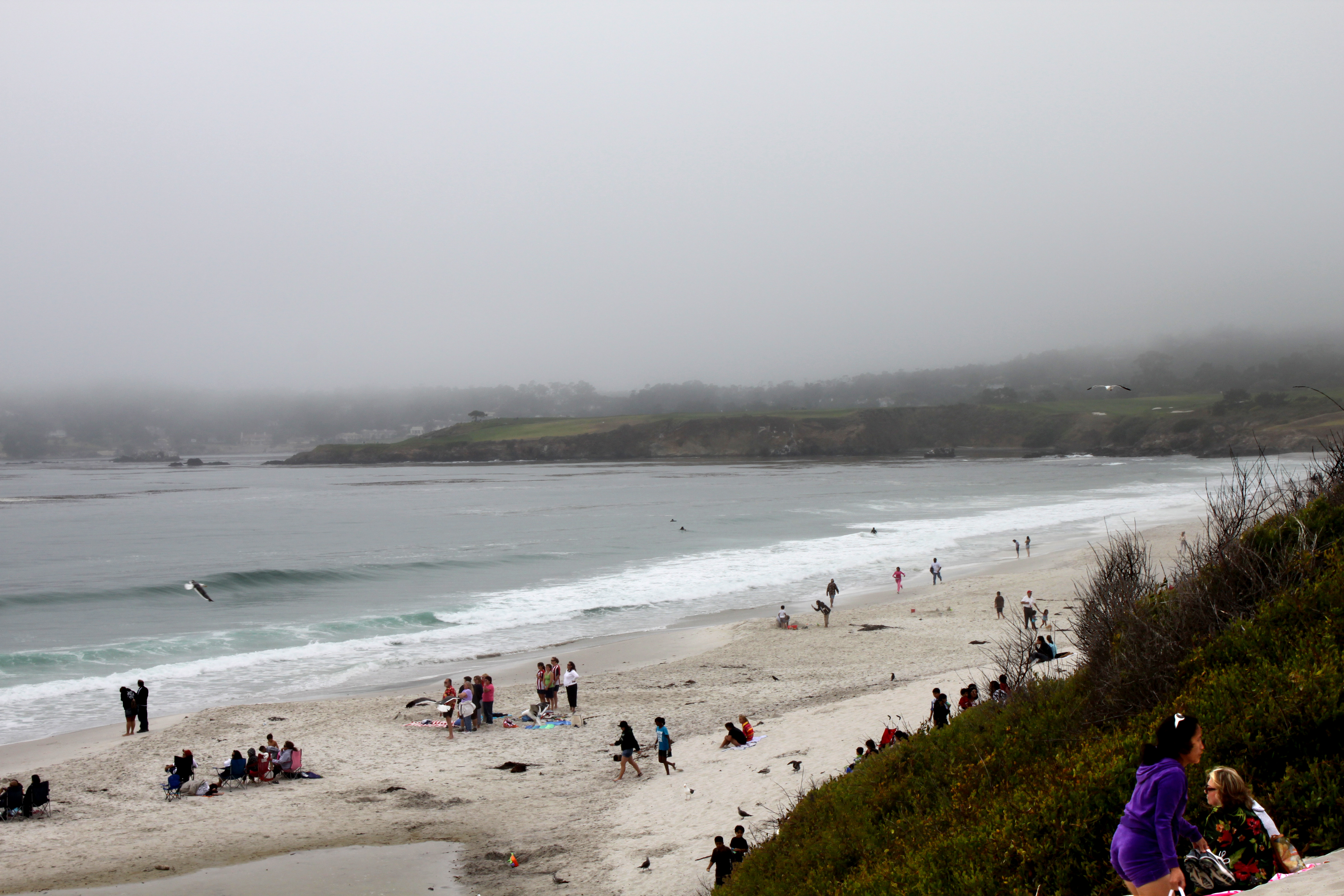
Carmel Bay on a foggy afternoon

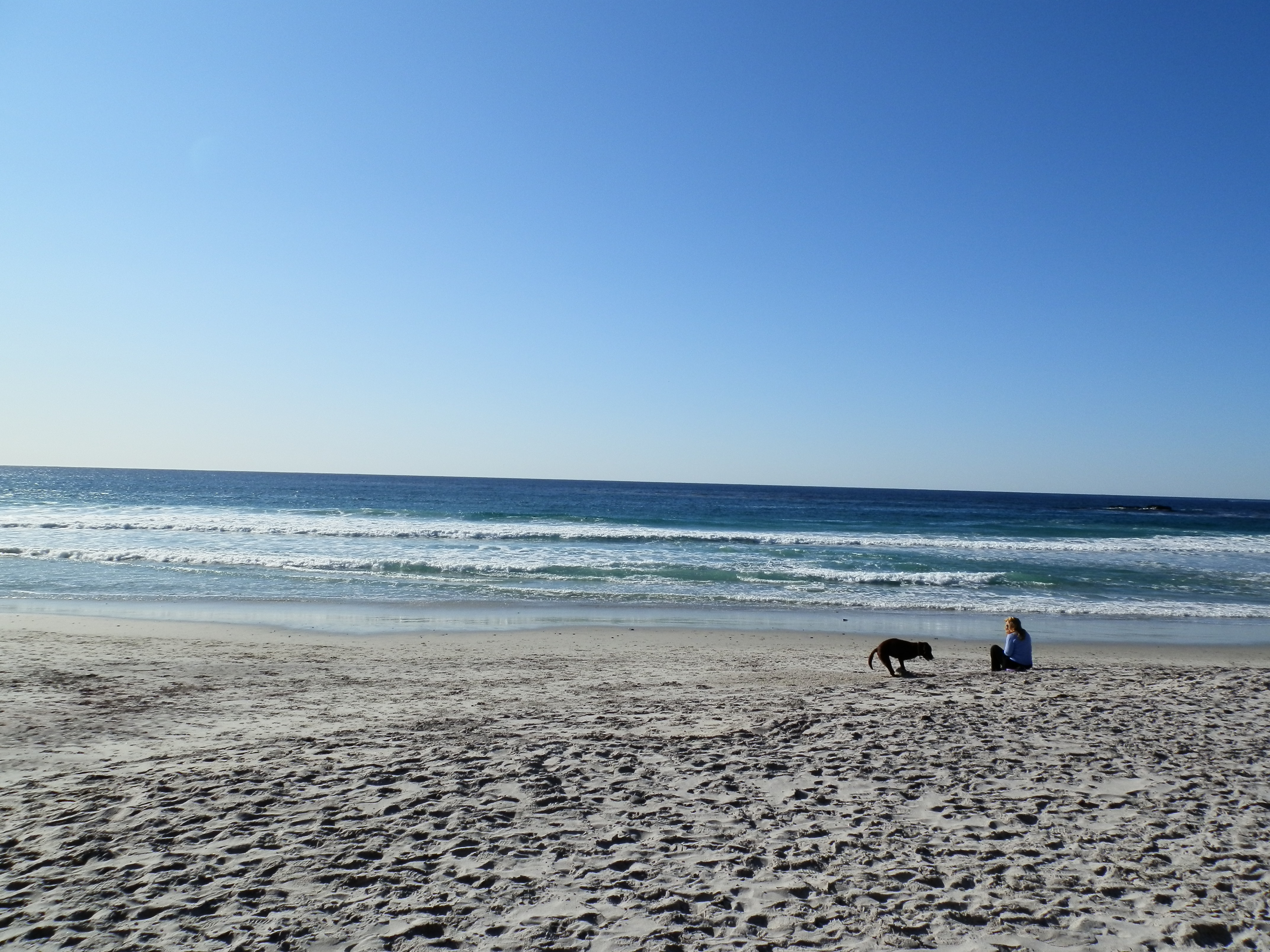
Carmel Bay on a sunny afternoon

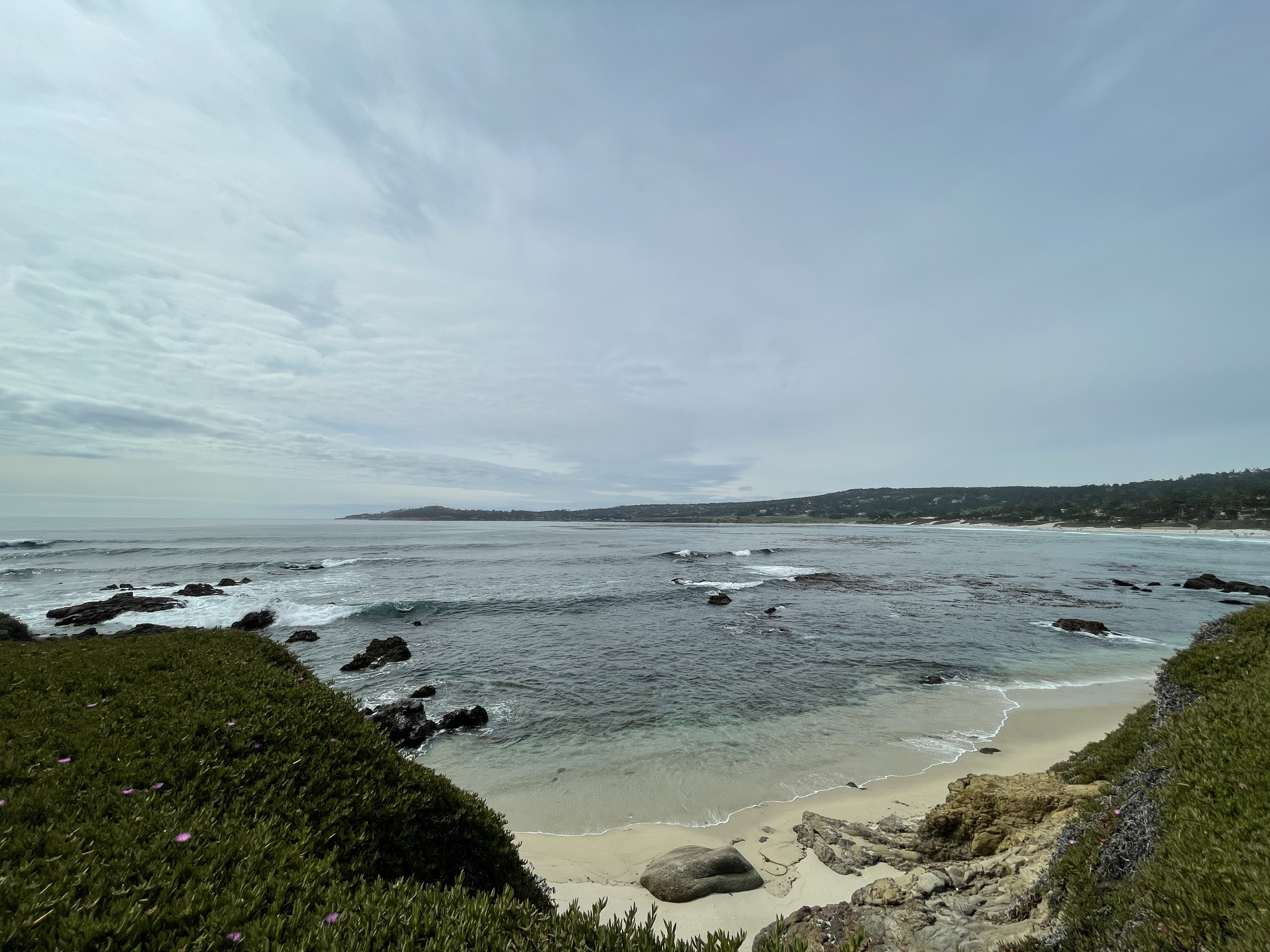
Carmel Bay from Carmel Point

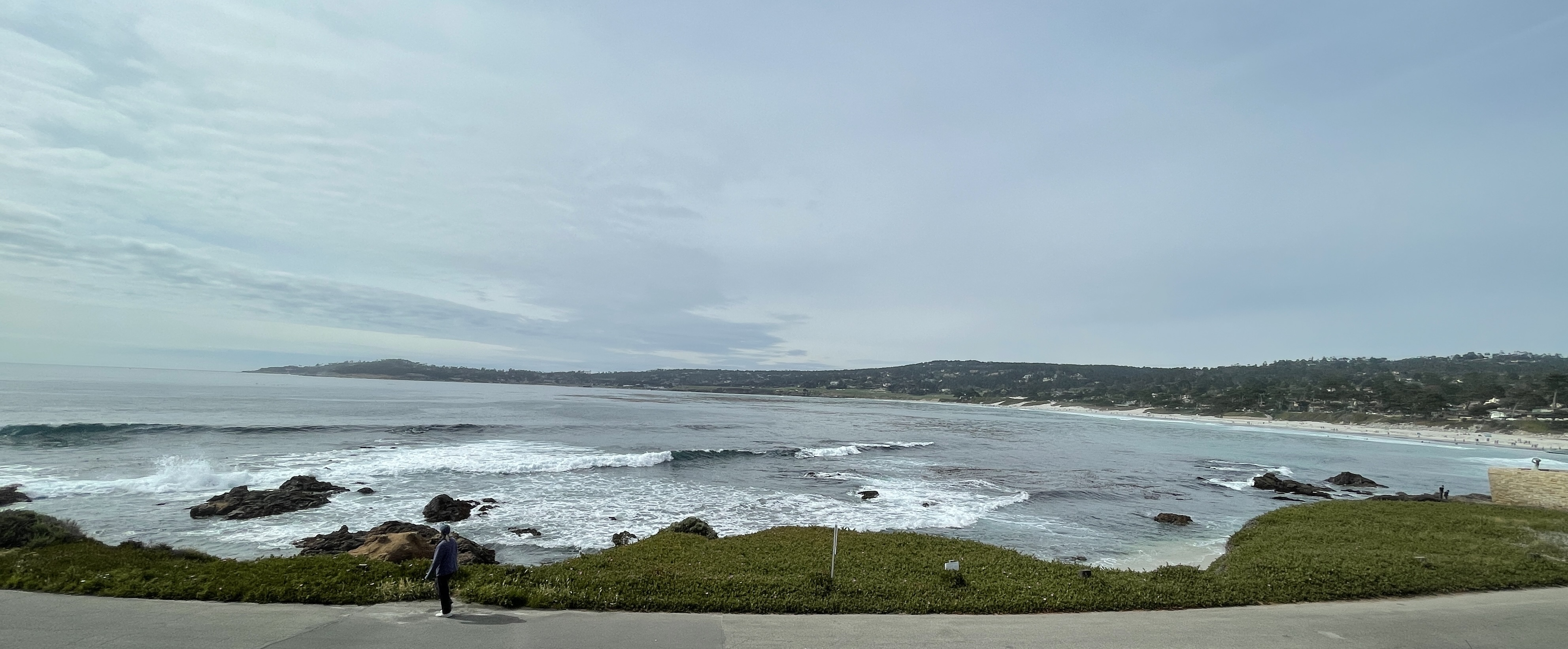
Carmel Bay from Scenic Road

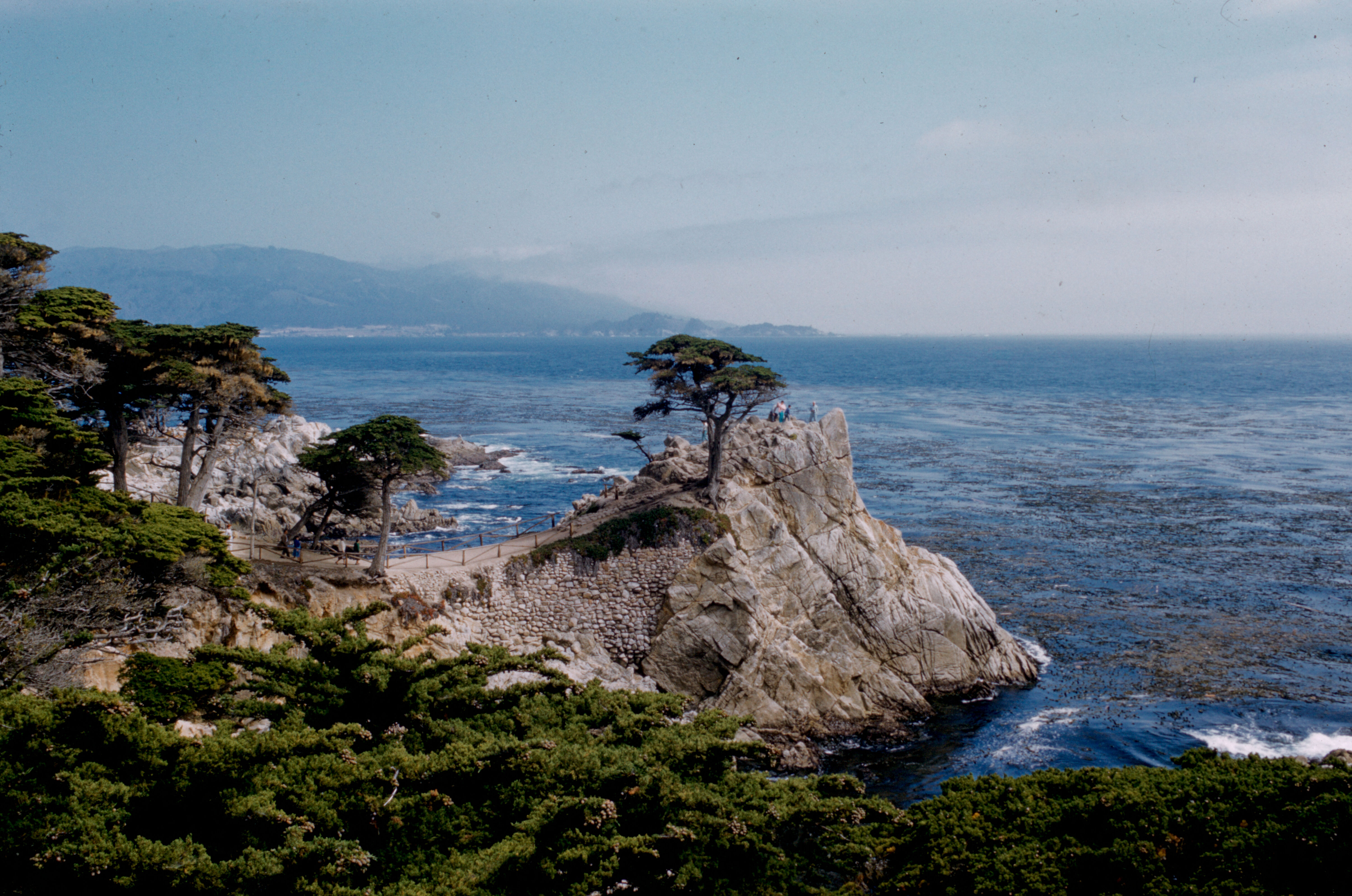
Carmel Bay coast in 1962
