= Clearlake Park, California =

Clearlake Park
- Former unincorporated community District of Clearlake
- Location in California
- Coordinates: 38°58′00″N 122°39′04″W
- Country: United States
- State: California
- County: Lake County
- City: Clearlake
- Elevation: 1,362 ft (415 m)

Clearlake Park (formerly, Clear Lake, Clear Lake Park, and Jacks Landing) is a former unincorporated community now incorporated in Clearlake, in Lake County, California. It is located on the north shore of the southeast end of Clear Lake, just north of the village of Clearlake Highlands and about 15 miles (24 km) east-southeast of Lakeport, at an elevation of 1362 feet (415 m).

The Clearlake post office opened in 1923, changed its name to Clearlake Park in 1937, and changed it back in 1980 when Clearlake incorporated.
