= Cambria Pines, California =

Unincorporated community in California

- Unincorporated community
- Location within the state of California Cambria Pines, California (the United States)
- Coordinates: 35°34′03″N 121°05′39″W
- Country: United States
- State: California
- County: San Luis Obispo
- Elevation: 190 ft (58 m)
- Time zone: UTC-8 (Pacific (PST))
  - Summer (DST): UTC-7 (PDT)
- Area code: 805
- GNIS feature ID: 1703074

Cambria Pines is an unincorporated community in San Luis Obispo County, California, United States. It lies on the Monterey pine-covered hills immediately west-northwest of Cambria, above the coast, and is reached from State Route 1.

== History ==
Cambria Pines is one of the residential tracts laid out among the pine-covered hills and coastal terraces around Cambria, from which it takes its name. San Luis Obispo County records that the hills around the original commercial area were subdivided in the late 1920s into 25-foot lots by the Cambria Development Company, which also installed the original water supply and distribution system. The county describes these subdivisions as created largely during the 1920s, when many thousands of small lots, typically 25 by 70 feet, were platted, much of the area laid out with little regard for the natural features of the land.

The pattern of small lots has shaped later planning. The Cambria Community Services District adopted a buildout reduction plan intended to cap development at 4,650 dwelling units by permanently retiring lots, with an open space or conservation easement recorded against the title of each retired parcel to prohibit development in perpetuity. The county identifies the lack of permanent open space in western Lodge Hill, and the residential densities that the number of small lots would produce at buildout, as the area's most pressing issues.

== Geography ==
Cambria Pines Lodge

The United States Geological Survey records Cambria Pines as a populated place at an elevation of 190 feet (58 m) on the Cambria quadrangle. Cambria Pines Road connects the north side of Cambria with State Route 1, and the Cambria Pines Lodge, a visitor-serving facility on Lodge Hill, takes its name from the same tract. The county's area plan designates Cambria Pines Lodge for recreational use and describes it as a major visitor-serving facility in Cambria; the surrounding East Lodge Hill area contains larger lots and some multiple-family housing. The tract lies within the Cambria stand of Monterey pine, one of three native populations on the California mainland. The county notes that trees are removed to accommodate new homes as residential growth continues in the forest.
