= Cuttings Wharf, California =

Unincorporated community in California, United States

Cuttings Wharf
- unincorporated community
- Location in California Cuttings Wharf (the United States)
- Coordinates: 38°13′36″N 122°18′32″W
- Country: United States
- State: California
- County: Napa
- Elevation: 6.6 ft (2 m)

Cuttings Wharf is an unincorporated community in Napa County, California, United States. It lies at an elevation of 7 feet (2 m). Cuttings Wharf is located on the Napa River, 4 miles (6.4 km) northwest of Napa Junction.

In 1893, Francis Cutting developed a wharf at this location so that ships could pick up fruit grown in Napa at the Cutting Fruit Packing Company. In 1924, Napa County purchased the site as a public boat landing

A fishing resort adjacent to the wharf was built by Ernest Lundy. Mae Norman operated the resort from 1928 until 1961. Most of the buildings of the resort were razed, though Charles Moore moved some of them to his resort, also located adjacent to the wharf property.

Some of the World War II effort-era plywood houses from Shipyard Acres were moved a few miles west to the Cuttings Wharf area, resurrected, and as of 2009 were still in place near the marina.

In the 1950s, twenty four surplus military buildings were floated from Richmond up the Napa River and installed near Moore's landing. In 1969, a picket at the Napa County courthouse led to county supervisors touring housing at Cuttings Wharf investigating reports of substandard housing. In the early 2000s, the buildings were found to be in violation of health and safety codes. The renters were evicted in early 2011. The buildings were eventually demolished.

Cuttings Wharf is the final resting place of the SS Cabrillo, a wooden steamship used to transport passengers between Los Angeles and the Channel Islands.

The boat launch facility at Cuttings Wharf was rebuilt in the late 1970s.
