= Canyon Crest Heights, California =

Neighborhood of Riverside, California, United States

Canyon Crest
- Neighborhood of Riverside
- Location in California
- Coordinates: 33°58′50″N 117°19′44″W
- Country: United States
- State: California
- County: Riverside County
- City: Riverside
- Elevation: 1,056 ft (322 m)

Canyon Crest is one of the largest and most diverse neighborhoods of Riverside. Primarily suburban in character, the area is home to large populations of families, UC Riverside students and faculty, retirees, and young professionals.

== Diversity ==
Its diversity is found both in its topography and in its residents. Canyon Crest was formed by six separate land annexations, all of which occurred between 1959 and 1986. Most of the development in the neighborhood reflects modern subdivision design. The land is developed for medium-density residential uses, with some high- and low-density areas included to serve a variety of residential needs. The hilly terrain has shaped development. The Canyon Crest Towne Centre is the economic focus for the area and offers a variety of dining options and shopping for the neighborhood, including the large student population in the nearby apartments.

== History ==
Canyon Crest has its roots in the citrus industry. In 1907, the Monte Vista Nursery was established in the area, which now includes the Canyon Crest Town Centre. This nursery, which specialized in citrus stock, once occupied 200 acres.

Two cultural resources within the neighborhood include the William Childs House, a 1910 Craftsman bungalow listed on the National Register of Historic Places, and the locally significant Art Deco entry monuments at University Drive. These monuments were once in place on the west side of the old Buena Vista Bridge, and were moved when the bridge was replaced in the 1960s.

Canyon Crest includes the Sycamore Highlands Specific Plan area, which abuts the northeastern edge of Sycamore Canyon Park and is in close proximity to the Box Spring Mountains. These natural features, along with the Tequesquite Arroyo, provide open spaces for outdoor recreation and scenic vistas. The Canyon Crest Country Club section of the community has views of the city, mountains and golf course.

== Community ==
The Canyon Crest Neighborhood is served by public facilities, community parks and schools. New Canyon Crest Fire Station No.14 and Mission Grove Fire Station No.9 serve the neighborhood. Castle View Park includes three acres developed as a playground and 27 acres in natural open space. Quail Run Park is an undeveloped, open space park. Sycamore Highlands Park is a 10-acre neighborhood park serving recreational needs of the residents within the Sycamore Highlands area. This park has views of Riverside's downtown and surrounding areas and includes access to the many trails within the extensive Sycamore Canyon Wilderness Park. The 30-acre Andulka Park is adjacent to the neighborhood at the intersection of Central and Chicago Avenues. This park includes two new baseball fields, a tennis complex with a pro-shop, two lighted basketball courts, two volleyball courts, restroom and concession facilities, children's playground, picnic facilities, open meadow areas, parking and a walking/jogging trail with a native habitat area. Canyon Crest Country Club is located in the center of Canyon Crest. Finally, educational services are provided by Castle View Elementary School and other public and private schools in adjacent neighborhoods.
