= Circle Oaks, California =

Unincorporated community in California, United States

Circle Oaks
- Unincorporated community
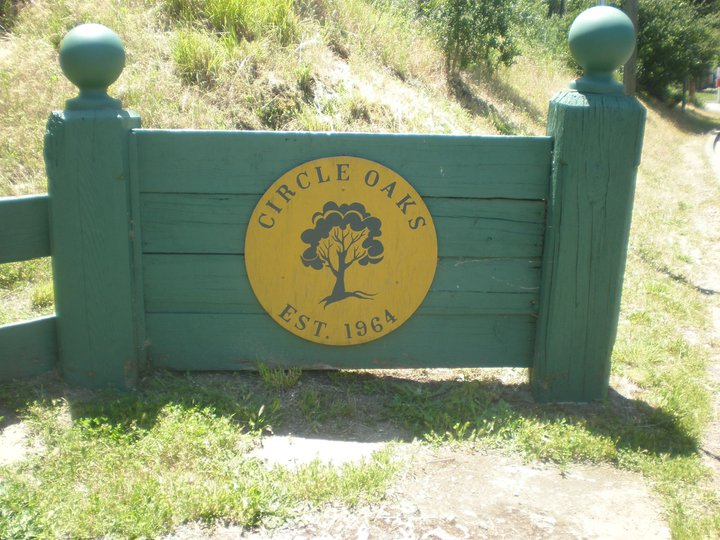
- The Circle Oaks logo, as seen from the bus stop near Monticello Road and Circle Oaks Drive

- Location within the state of California Circle Oaks (the United States)
- Coordinates: 38°24′37″N 122°12′39″W
- Country: United States
- State: California
- County: Napa
- Time zone: UTC-8 (Pacific (PST))
  - Summer (DST): UTC-7 (PDT)

Circle Oaks is an unincorporated community in the hills to the northeast of the Napa Valley in Napa County, California, United States. Created in 1964, this wildland interface has thrived since, growing into a small country community outside a bustling valley. Lots in the community are circular, with the areas between the circles ("triangles") considered to be non-developable "greenbelt", an idea supposedly envisioned by renowned architect Frank Lloyd Wright. The community was initially planned to have an airstrip and golf course, but these never materialized.

Circle Oaks was threatened, but not significantly damaged, by the 2017 Atlas and 2020 Hennessey fires.
