= Camp Bartlett, California =

Unincorporated community in California, United States

Coordinates: 34°25′41″N 119°06′29″W

Camp Bartlett is a small, isolated, rural unincorporated community in Upper Ojai, Ventura County, California, United States. Six of the twelve cabins in the community, located east of the city of Ojai, burned down in the Thomas Fire in 2017.

John Bartlett was an early owner of Rancho Ojai which he bought from Juan Camarillo in 1864. He subdivided the grant lands, selling one third to John B. Church, and the remaining two thirds to John Wyeth in 1865.
