= Cockatoo Grove, California =

Unincorporated community in California, United States

Coordinates: 32°38′35″N 116°59′02″W

Cockatoo Grove was a populated place in San Diego County, California, United States. As of 2015, the former location of Cockatoo Grove is within the Otay Lakes neighborhood of Chula Vista, California.
