= Colusa Rancheria, California =

Unincorporated community in California, United States

Colusa Rancheria
- Unincorporated community
- Location in California Colusa Rancheria (the United States)
- Coordinates: 39°15′01″N 122°01′33″W
- Country: United States
- State: California
- County: Colusa County
- Elevation: 59 ft (18 m)

Colusa Rancheria (also, Cachildehe Rancheria) is an unincorporated community in Colusa County, California. It lies at an elevation of 59 feet (18 m). It was established in 1907. As of the 2010 Census the population was 76.

The ranchería belongs to the Cachil DeHe Band of Wintun Indians of the Colusa Indian Community of the Colusa Rancheria, a federally recognized tribe of Wintun people.
