= Tehama deer herd =

Deer herd in Tehama County, California

- Wildlife population
- Interactive map of Tehama deer herd
- Coordinates: 40.169°N 121.560°W
- Country: United States
- State: California
- County: Tehama

Population (2001)
  - Total: 22,100

The Tehama deer herd is a herd of deer in eastern Tehama County, California. During the 1950s and 1960s, the deer herd was California's largest, with more than 100,000 deer. In the early 1990s, the herd had dwindled to about 30,000 members, and as of 2001, it had reduced to 22,100 deer. The herd winters in the Tehama Wildlife Area, migrating from places as distant as Lassen Volcanic National Park, up to 100 miles (160 km) eastward.
