= Clearlake Highlands, California =

Clearlake Highlands
- Former unincorporated community District of Clearlake
- Location in California
- Coordinates: 38°57′20″N 122°38′34″W
- Country: United States
- State: California
- County: Lake County
- City: Clearlake

Area
  - Total: 10.45 sq mi (27.1 km^{2})
- Elevation: 1,355 ft (413 m)

Clearlake Highlands is a former unincorporated community now incorporated in Clearlake, in Lake County, California. It is located on the north shore of the southeast end of Clear Lake, just south of the village of Clearlake Park, 15 miles (24 km) east-southeast of Lakeport, at an elevation of 1348 feet (411 m).

Clearlake was originally settled by Americans in the late 1860s. Prior to settlement by Americans the area was inhabited by Pomo Indians. Their artifacts and grave sites have been found along Cache Creek at the Southern city limit as well as the area around Borax Lake in the northwest portion of the city.

Clearlake remained a farming and ranching community until the 1920s when it became a resort destination along with other areas in Lake County. A large portion of the area which was to become the City of Clearlake was subdivided in 1925. Most of the city lots are only 50' by 100' feet and none of the infrastructure was established at the time of subdivision. A majority of the roads were never paved and some only exist on paper.

Clearlake has historically depended on tourism as its main industry with the attraction being Clear Lake. This has been a boom or bust cycle over the decades depending on several factors. Clear Lake is California's largest natural lake and boasts itself as being "The Bass Capital of the West".
