= Calflax, California =

Unincorporated community in California, United States

Calflax
- Unincorporated community
- Location in California Calflax (the United States)
- Coordinates: 36°20′33″N 120°06′11″W
- Country: United States
- State: California
- County: Fresno
- Elevation: 276 ft (84 m)

Calflax is an unincorporated community in Fresno County, California, United States. It is located 20 miles (32 km) northeast of Coalinga, at an elevation of 276 feet (84 m).

Calflax was established in the mid-1930s when irrigated flax and cotton fields were planted in the once-barren west San Joaquin Valley. Calflax originally had a school, store, and cotton gin. In 1959, the University of California West Side Research and Extension Center was established on the site of Calflax. A few scattered residences remain at the site today.
