= Cottage Springs, California =

Unincorporated community in California, United States

Cottage Springs
- Unincorporated community
- Location in California Cottage Springs (the United States)
- Coordinates: 38°21′22″N 120°12′43″W
- Country: United States
- State: California
- County: Calaveras
- Elevation: 5,827 ft (1,776 m)

Cottage Springs is a minor set of springs in Calaveras County, California, United States. It lies at an elevation of 5827 feet (1776 m).
