= Calzona, California =

Unincorporated community in California, United States

Calzona
- Unincorporated community
- Location within the state of California Calzona (the United States)
- Coordinates: 34°07′29.7″N 114°25′27.1″W
- Country: United States
- State: California
- County: San Bernardino
- Elevation: 463 ft (141 m)

Population
  - Total: 6
- Time zone: UTC-8 (Pacific)
  - Summer (DST): UTC-7 (PDT)
- ZIP codes: 92242
- Area codes: 442/760
- GNIS feature ID: 252866

Calzona is an unincorporated community located in San Bernardino County in the U.S. state of California. The town is located approximately 10 miles southeast of Vidal Junction, California, five miles east of Vidal, California, and borders the southern edge of the community of Big River. It is less than a mile from the Colorado River. It is located in the Sonoran Desert and in a transition zone that includes climatic and botanical aspects of Mojave Desert. It also straddles the border with the Colorado River Indian Tribes, whose lands exist on both sides of the river near the full service city of Parker, Arizona. Calzona is a portmanteau of California and Arizona.

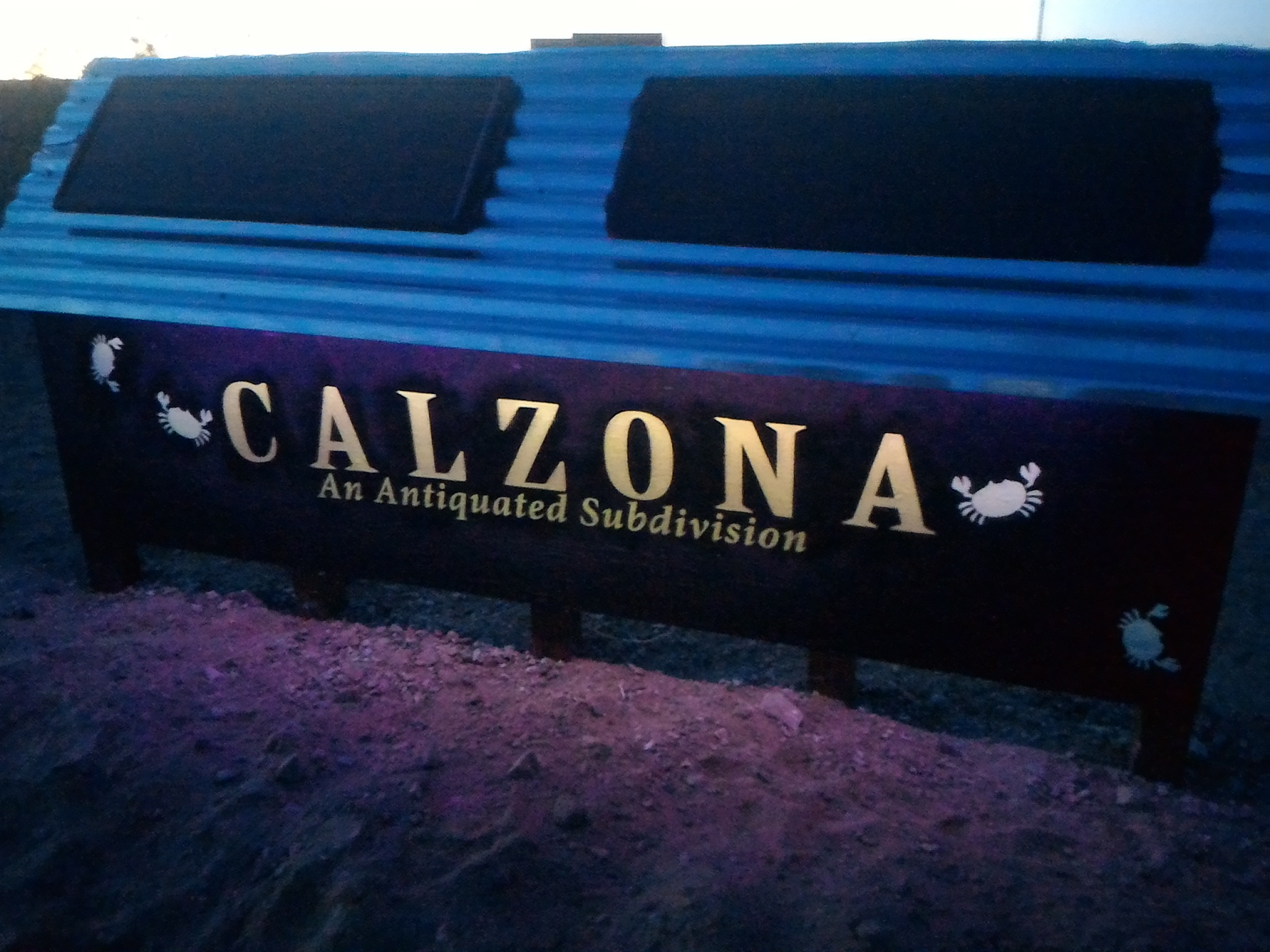
A sign in Calzona reading "CALZONA - An Antiquated Subdivision"

== History ==
Calzona was born as a railroad town and shipping point for the mining camps that were active in the region in the first decade of the 20th century. An early memory of Calzona was recorded in the autobiography of area pioneer Camiel Dekens, who observed that "Parker was tame compared to Calzona on the California side of the river."

I BELIEVE CALZONA was started as a railroad construction camp town. The rails hadn’t been laid west of the river on the Parker cutoff, but the grading was in progress. In addition to construction workers, the town also drew men from the small mines that were operating all over the area, including the one-man-and-a-burro mines. It’s surprising now to recall how many old burro men were coming from their claims and dry washers in those days, loaded with maybe $100 or $150 worth of placer gold to blow in at such places as Calzona, Ehrenberg or Quartzsite.

— Camiel Dekens and Tom Paterson, "Chapter 2, Man of All Work", Riverman, Desertman (2011)

The First Annual Report of the Arizona Corporations Commission documents two trade disputes between mining companies and the El Paso and Southwestern System. The disputes both involve shipping fees for ore transported from Calzona to Douglas, Arizona. The Second Annual Report shows that the Morgan and Bradley company of Calzona received $129.39 in full settlement of their claim. The Tuscarora Mining Co., of Parker, Arizona settled their claim for $95.88.

Wyatt Earp's desert home initially was at Calzona, but only in the winter months. During the hot summer, when the temperatures built up to the point where it was uncomfortable to mine the Earps moved into Los Angeles. Calzona was situated along a bumpy dirt road that led to the Colorado River ferry near Parker, Arizona. The small town consisted of a store, a railroad station, a post office and a small cluster of houses.

A Winter 1977 article in Old West Magazine makes many references to the original town site of Calzona. Utilizing contemporary interviews, author Tom C. Murray references Jimmy Wilson, who was a Constable at the Calzona township. Also interviewed is Inspector Hal Oxnevad "who directed law enforcement in the Calzona area for many years and was in charge of the jail and Sheriff's substation." Former Calzona Postmaster Halbert Bradley is mentioned. "At Calzona, Bradley not only mined but ran an assay office. Water shortage doomed Calzona's infant grapefruit orchards while the fire ended the little business district." The article does not clearly indicate specific dates for any events related to the town site.

== 1942 Train Accident ==
Train No. 117 owned by the Atchison, Topeka and Santa Fe Railway Company derailed at about 10:30 PM on June 25, 1942, 2.88 miles east of Calzona. The accident killed the engineer and fireman, and the conductor was injured along with 30 other individuals. The cause was shown to be that bridge 111-B had burned to ground, leaving the rails suspended in air. The engineer engaged the breaks two seconds before crashing into the breach, derailing the engine, baggage car, and chair car. Two Pullman Sleepers remained on the tracks with some damage. A freight train had uneventfully passed through the area at approximately 11 am the same day. The cause of the fire was not determined.

== Ghost town ==
The parts of Calzona once occupied by the railroad town are now an almost completely desiccated Ghost town, featuring only an extensive area of debris, some evidence of grading and infrastructure, and remaining foundations of small buildings.

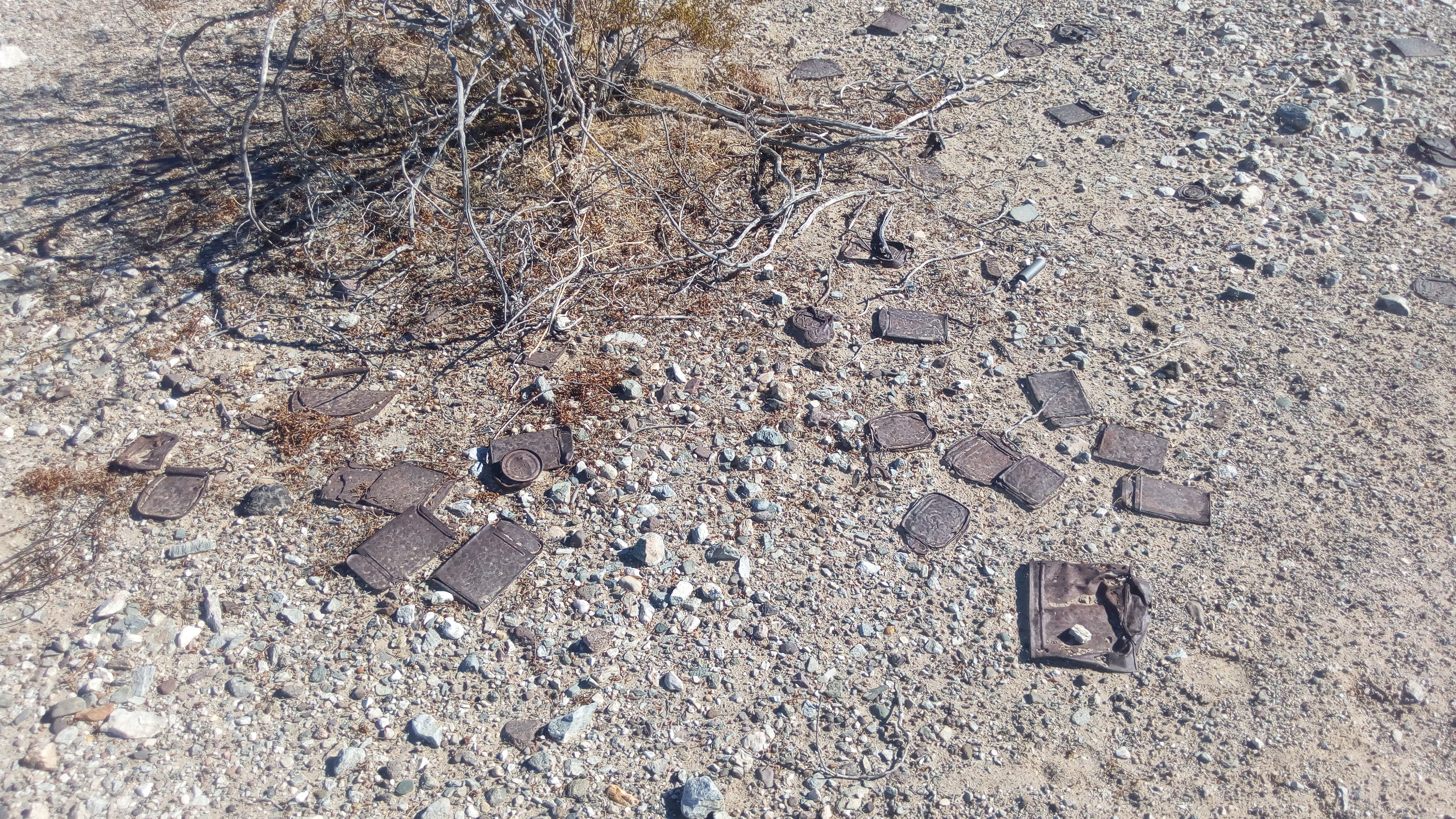
Typical appearance of Debris field left at desiccated ghost town site of Calzona, California, 2018. There is also evidence of small building foundations and some infrastructure. The town site apparently burned sometime before 1942.

== Subdivision ==
The American (read U.S.) legacy of chopping (the legal term is “subdividing”) land into land units that are useless for any reasonable economic purpose, other than perhaps real estate speculation, best describes the Calzona subdivision. Calzona includes hundreds of 5225 square foot lots, not large enough to justify individual water wells, and insufficient in size for individual septic systems. The small lots were created as taxable lots complete with APN numbers and an annual property tax bill from the county of San Bernardino. Other lots in the area are larger, but the neighbors report natural arsenic in their well water. Roads in the subdivision include Calzona Avenue, Gobi Avenue, Atacama Avenue, and Oasis Avenue. Old Parker Road intersects the subdivision.

Calzona hosts a few houses on larger lots in the area. There are some cultural activities around Calzona, such as the Calzona Museum, located at 11 Calzona Avenue, which features Contemporary Art, art & technology and Digital Art shows from artists around the world. Calzona also hosts an educational enterprise, Calzona Tech, which is dedicated to digital media and technology research.

== Gallery ==
Calzona, CA

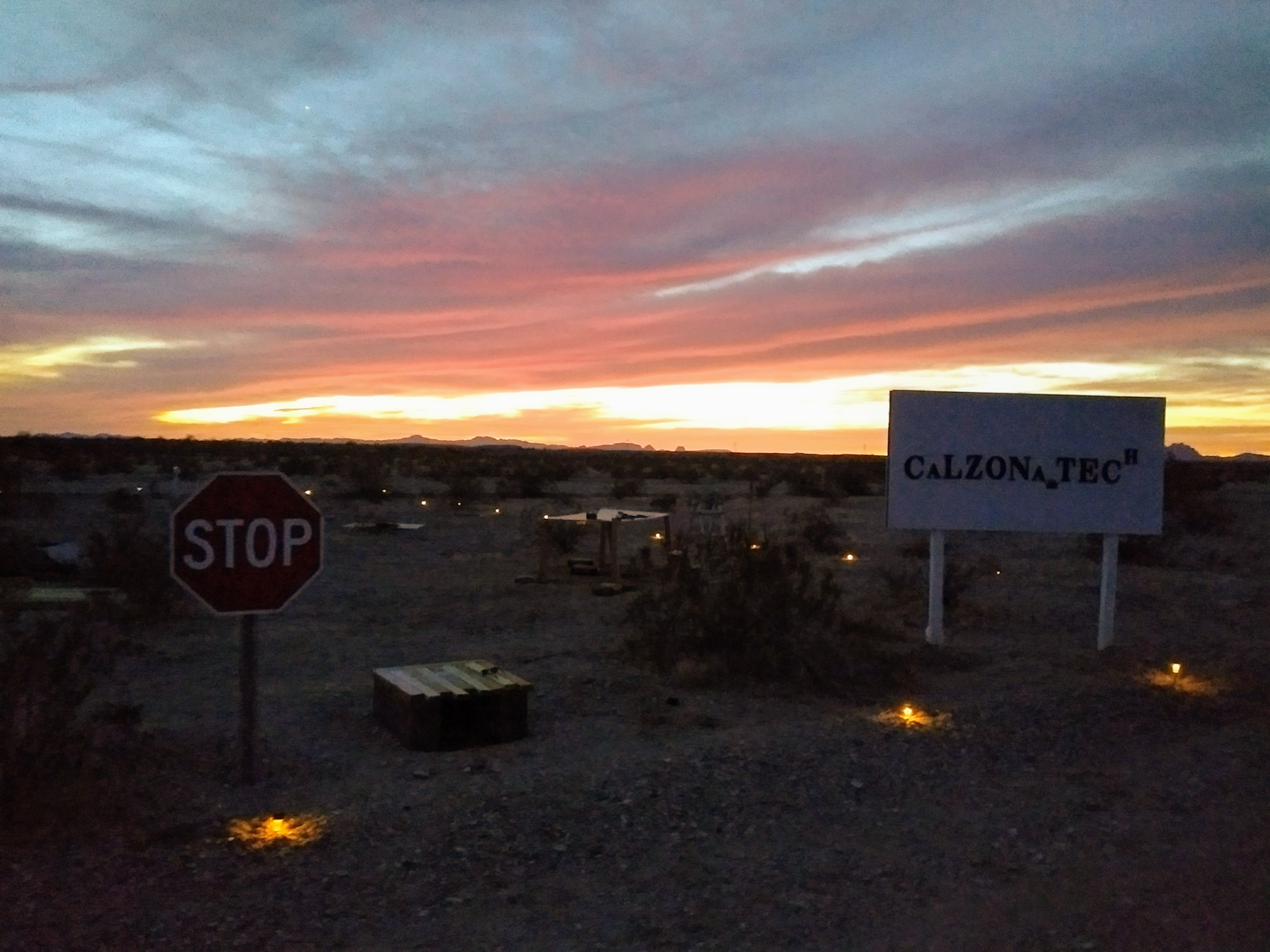
Calzona Tech

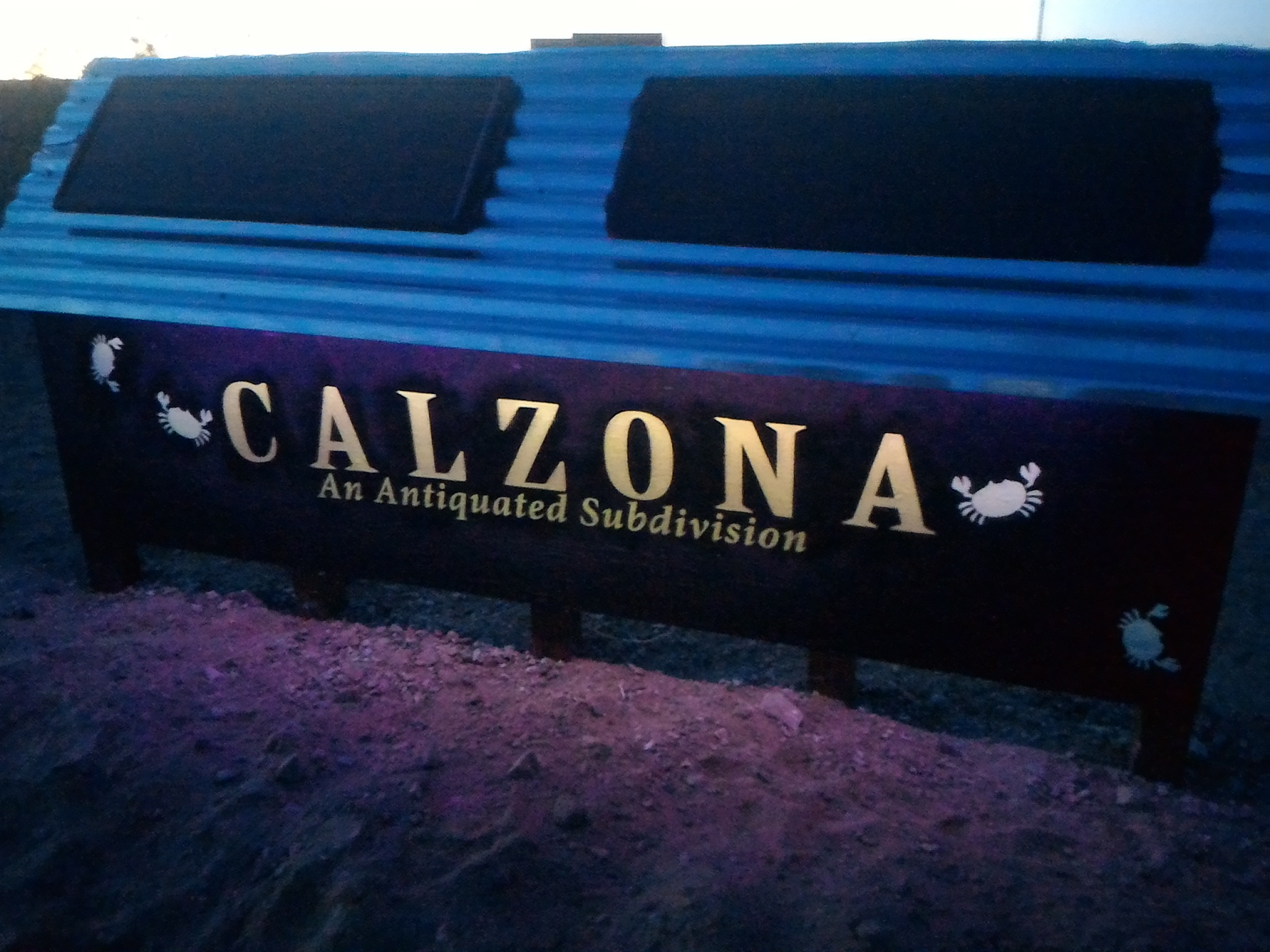
Calzona, California

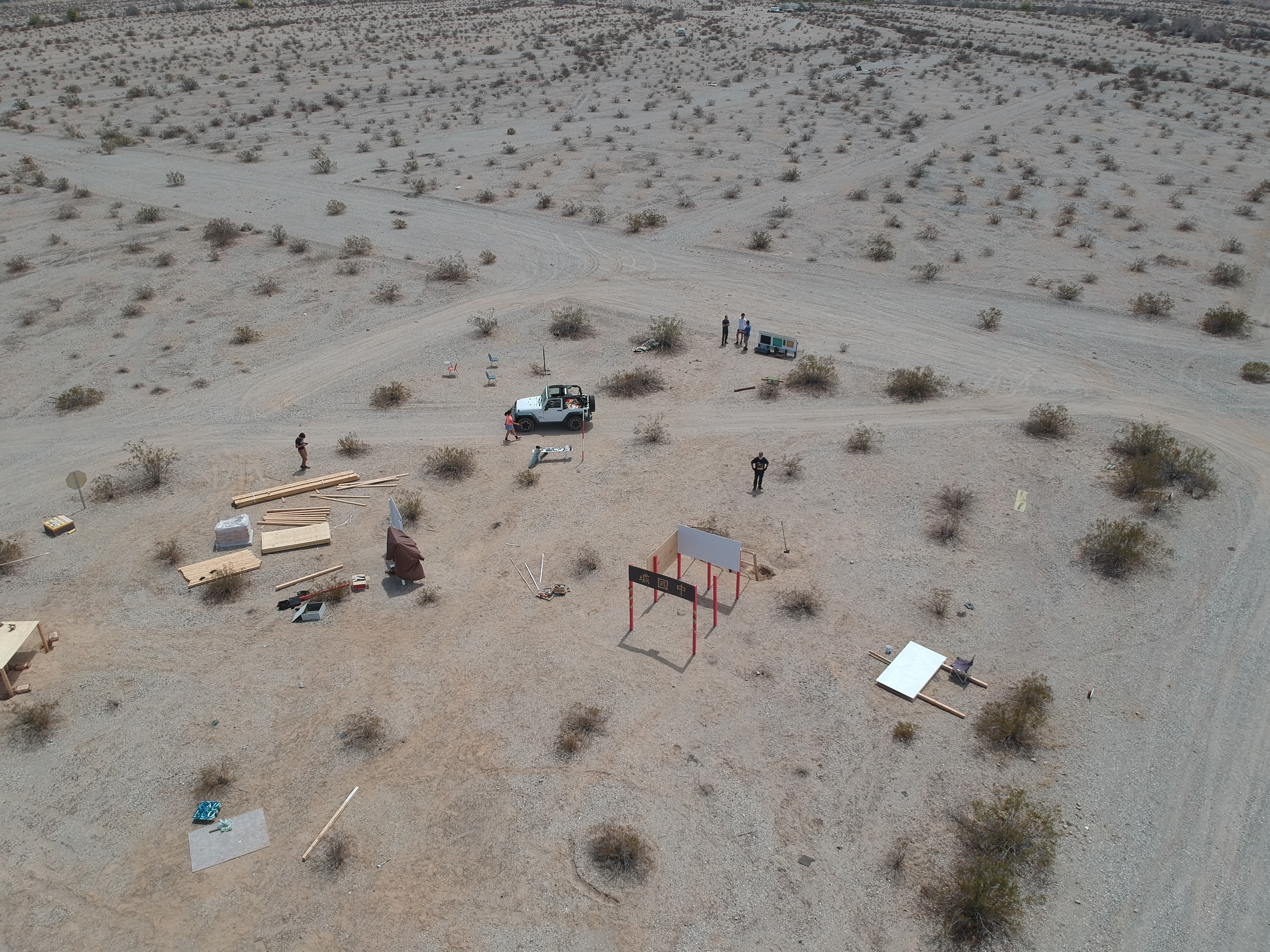
Calzona by Drone

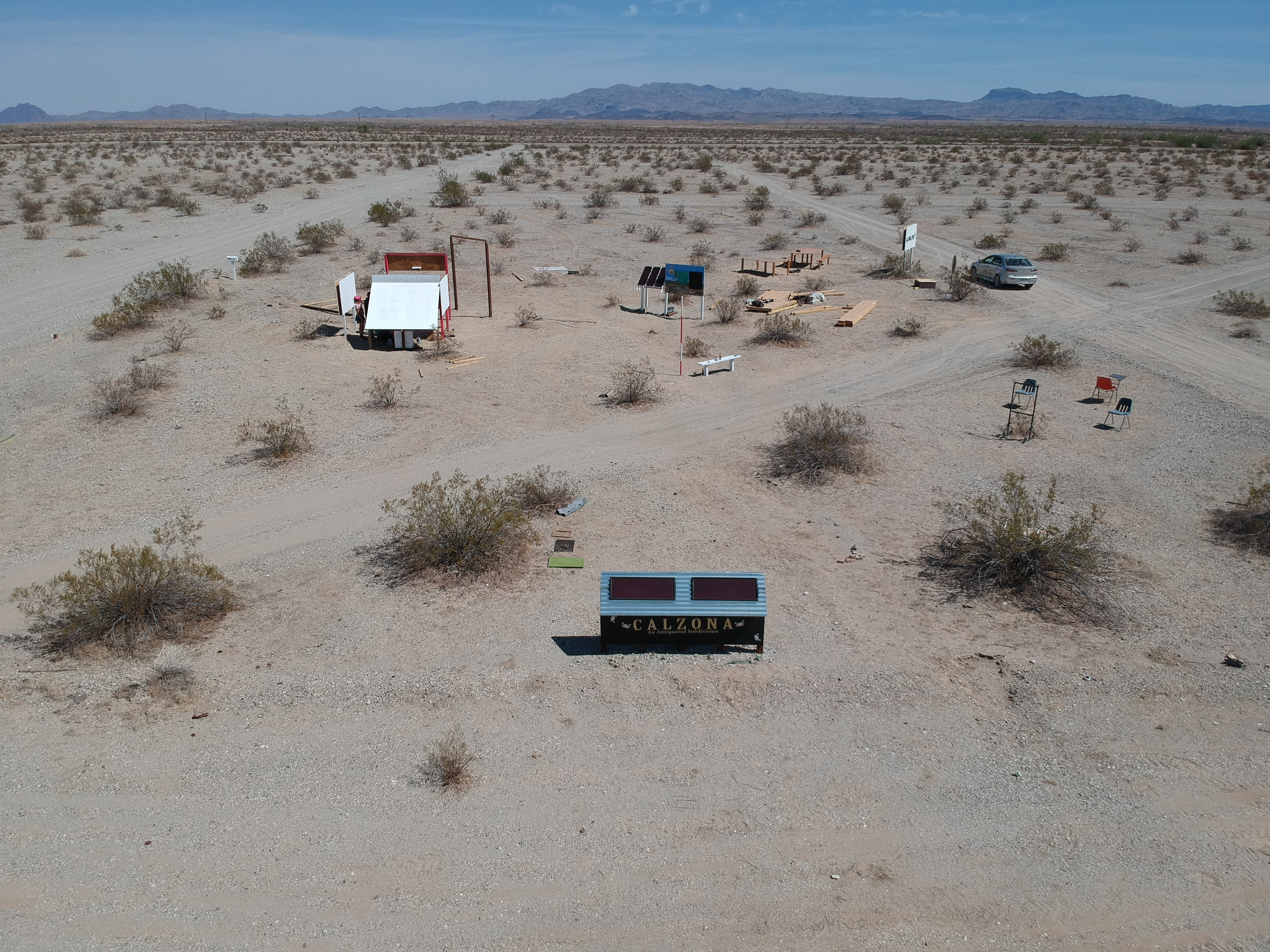
Calzona by DJI Drone

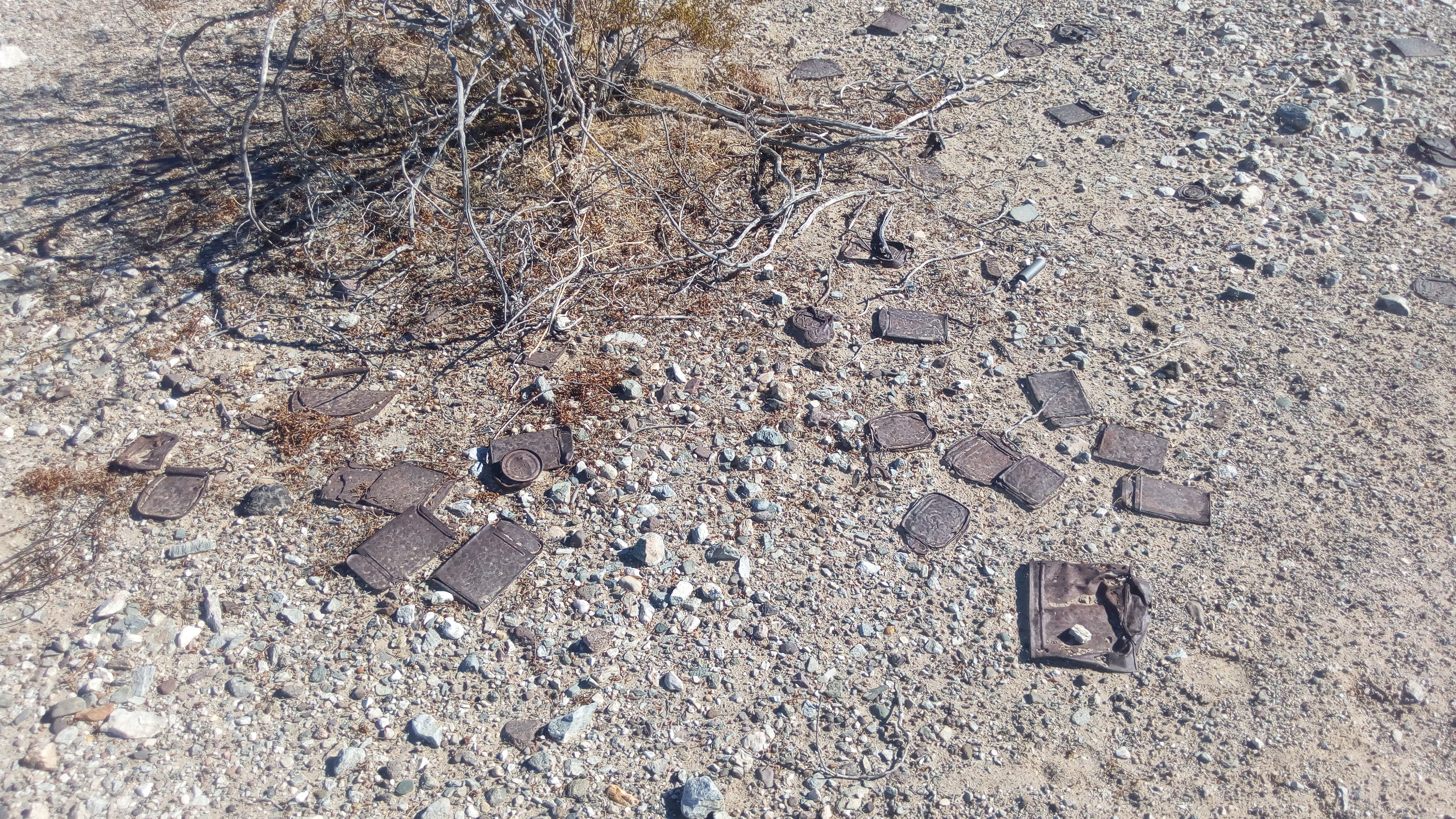
Typical appearance of Debris field left at desiccated ghost town site of Calzona, California, 2018
