= Curtner, Fremont, California =

Coordinates: 37°28′11″N 121°55′25″W

Curtner is a neighborhood of Fremont in Alameda County, California. It lies at an elevation of 30 feet (9.1 m). It was formerly an unincorporated community.
