= Castle Rock Springs, California =

Castle Rock Springs
- Unincorporated community
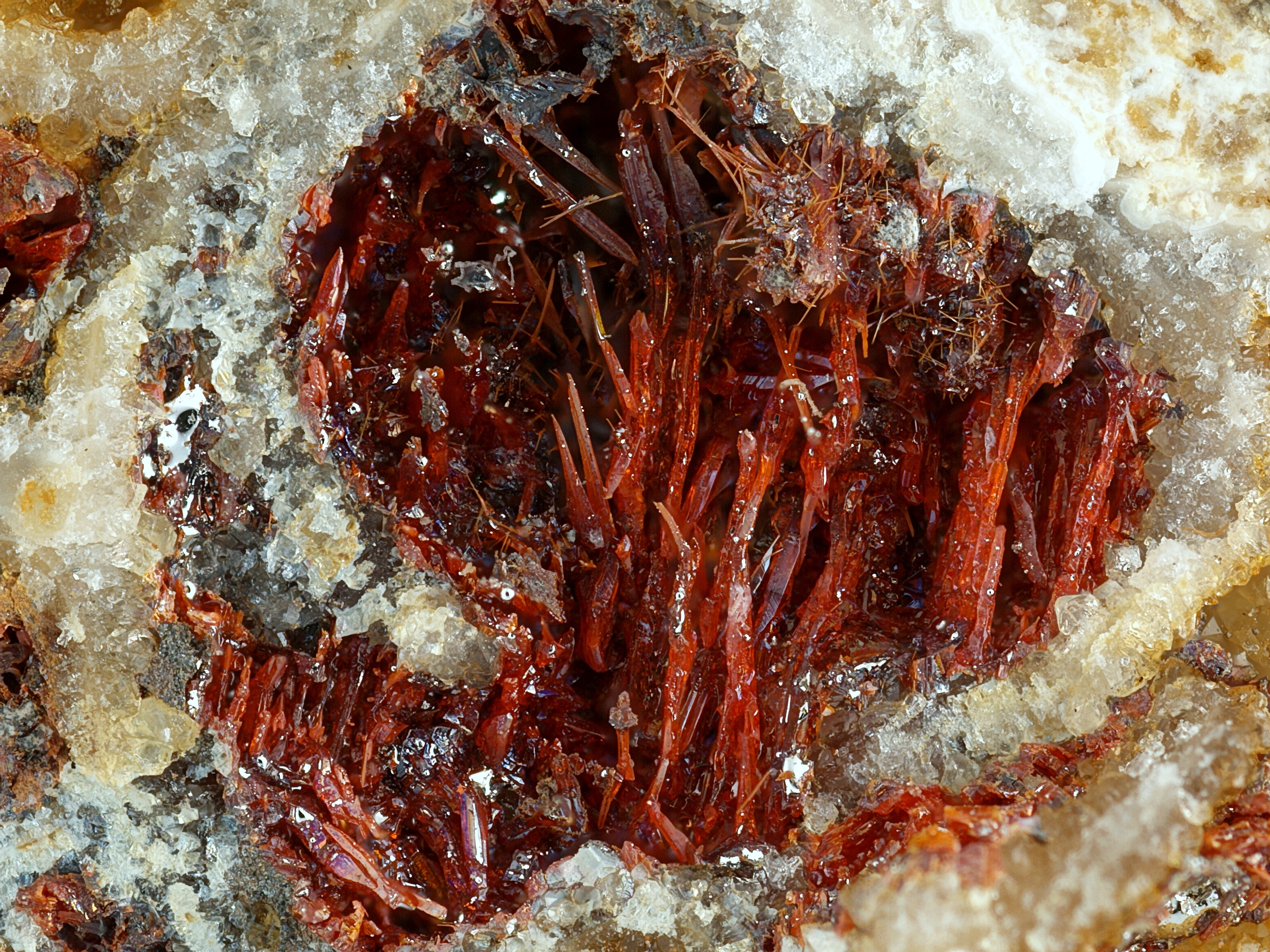
- Montroydite from the Socrates Mine in the Castle Rock Springs area

- Location in California Castle Rock Springs (the United States)
- Coordinates: 38.7701834°N 122.7166564°W
- Country: United States
- State: California
- County: Lake County
- Elevation: 2,342 ft (714 m)

Castle Rock Springs was a resort in Lake County, California built around a group of mineral springs, including one hot spring with relatively high volumes of water.

Former names include Mills Hot Springs, Mills' Mineral Springs, Noble's Springs, Castle Springs, Castle Hot Springs, Verdant Vales, Camp Houdd Gibson and Houdd Gibson Camp.

== Location ==
The Castle Springs are 7 miles (11 km) northwest of Middletown. They are 3 miles (4.8 km) south of Whispering Pines. The springs are high on a mountainside above the hot springs at Anderson Springs, which is 1 mile (1.6 km) to the east and 800 feet (240 m) lower. They are at an elevation of 2,342 feet (714 m). The resort buildings were about 1/4 mile (0.40 km) from the hot springs on a ridge with a fine view of the Putah Creek valley and mountains to the east.

== Springs ==
As of 1910 basins had been excavated and cemented at two hot springs a few yards apart in a ravine that feeds Putah Creek. The basins had temperatures of 160 and 164 °F (71 and 73 °C) and a combined flow of about 8 US gallons (30 L; 6.7 imp gal) per minute. The water was mildly sulphurated, but otherwise only slightly mineralized.

The Big Hot sulfur spring is in a small canyon above the hotel, and in 1914 delivered about 40,000 US gallons (150,000 L; 33,000 imp gal) of water daily, issuing from the spring at a temperature of 163 °F (73 °C). This water was piped to the bath house and the swimming tank. There was a small hot spring issuing from the bank near the Big Hot spring with a temperature of 153 °F (67 °C). Other springs on the property, with their temperature, were: Sour, 65 °F (18 °C); Black Sulphur, 67 °F (19 °C); White Sulphur, 66 °F (19 °C); Vangas, 66 °F (19 °C). Much hydrogen sulfide escaped from the bank around Vangas.

== History ==
The springs were located about 1885 by W. Mills. They were formerly known as Mills Springs or Noble's Springs. The property was run as a small resort where the hot water was used for bathing and the water of the cool sulfur springs for drinking. In the summer of 1910 the property had recently changed ownership and the resort was being improved. This included construction of a hotel, a bathhouse with a swimming plunge, and a dancing pavilion. Several tent cottages would also provide accommodations.

The Castle Springs post office operated here from 1911 to 1917. As of 1913 the property had been in litigation, but was now owned by Mrs. Campbell-Van Luven, who had stated that it would be reopened for the 1914 season. A fine cement-lined swimming pool 25 by 60 feet (7.6 by 18.3 m) has been built recently The hotel and cottages could accommodate 75 visitors.

The Castle Rock Springs Geothermal Steam Area has a large geothermal resource of steam at high temperature and moderate pressure several thousand feet below the surface. It is adjacent to The Geysers, which has been heavily developed for geothermal generation. An environmental impact report for a project in the area was issued in August 1975. The Camp Verdant Vales school is in the center of the area, and Anderson Springs borders the area to the east. At the time of study tourist resorts that were once operative in the area had closed, although some were now being used by specialized private religious communities.

== Sources ==
- "Castle Rock Springs", Geographic Names Information System, United States Geological Survey, United States Department of the Interior
- Durham, David L. (1998). California's Geographic Names: A Gazetteer of Historic and Modern Names of the State. Clovis, California: Word Dancer Press. p. 35. ISBN 1-884995-14-4.
- Environmental Impact Report Castle Rock Springs Geothermal Steam Area, Atlantis Scientific, 22 August 1975
- Hamilton, Fletcher (July 1915), "Report of State Mineralogist, 1913-1914", Appendix to the Journals of the Senate and Assembly of the forty-second session of the Legislature of the State of California, vol. VII
- Waring, Gerald Ashley (1915). Springs of California. U.S. Geological Survey Water Supply Paper. Vol. 338. U.S. Government Printing Office. doi:10.3133/wsp338.
