= Casa Loma, Placer County, California =

Unincorporated community in California, United States

Casa Loma
- Unincorporated community
- Location in California
- Coordinates: 39°12′02″N 120°46′36″W
- Country: United States
- State: California
- County: Placer County
- Elevation: 4,032 ft (1,229 m)

Casa Loma (Spanish for "Hill House") is an unincorporated community in Placer County, California. Casa Loma is located 3.25 miles (5.2 km) east of Dutch Flat. It lies at an elevation of 4032 feet (1229 m).

Casa Loma began around 1910-11 as a summer resort operated by the Unitarian Society. It was located on the Southern Pacific Railroad. A few residences remain at the site today.
