= Childs Meadows, California =

Unincorporated community in California, United States

Coordinates: 40°21′37″N 121°29′31″W

Location of Childs Meadows within Northern California

Childs Meadows is an unincorporated community in Tehama County, in the U.S. state of California.

== History ==
The community was named after Frank Childs, a local rancher. An RV park and camping resort called "The Village at Childs Meadow" today occupies the site.
