= California State Route 89 =

Highway in California

State Route 89
- Map of northern California with SR 89 highlighted in red; the gap represents the unofficial segment through Lassen Volcanic National Park

Route information
- Maintained by Caltrans
- Length: 243 mi (391 km) (Does not include the portion in Lassen Volcanic National Park)
- Tourist routes: Monitor Pass and Luther Pass Highways, and Lake Tahoe Road; Yuba-Donner Scenic Byway; Volcanic Legacy Scenic Byway
- Restrictions: Segments through Monitor Pass and Lassen Volcanic National Park closed in winter

Major junctions
- South end: US 395 in Topaz
- SR 4 near Markleeville; SR 88 from Alpine Village to near Picketts Junction; US 50 in South Lake Tahoe; I-80 in Truckee; SR 49 from Sierraville to near Sattley; SR 70 from Blairsden to near Indian Falls; SR 36 from near Chester to near Mineral; SR 44 from near Viola to Old Station; SR 299 near Johnson Park
- North end: I-5 / I-5 BL near Mount Shasta

Location
- Country: United States
- State: California
- Counties: Mono, Alpine, El Dorado, Placer, Nevada, Sierra, Plumas, Tehama, Shasta, Siskiyou

Highway system
- State highways in California; Interstate; US; State; Scenic; History; Pre‑1964; Unconstructed; Deleted; Freeways
← SR 88	→ SR 90

State Route 89 (SR 89) is a state highway in the U.S. state of California that travels in the north–south direction, serving as a major thoroughfare for many mountain communities in the Sierra Nevada and the Cascade Range. It starts from U.S. Route 395 near Topaz Lake, winding its way up to the 8,314-foot (2,534 m) Monitor Pass, down to the Carson River, and up again over the 7,740-foot (2,359 m) Luther Pass. From that point on, the route generally loses elevation on its way past Lake Tahoe, through Tahoe and Plumas National Forests until Lake Almanor. For roughly 9 miles (14 km) the route forms a concurrency with State Route 36. SR 89 then ascends to the 5,753-foot (1,754 m) Morgan Summit. After it enters Lassen Volcanic National Park it continues to gain elevation until it reaches its highest point through an unnamed pass in the middle of Lassen Peak and Bumpass Mountain. While SR 89 is signed as a continuous route through the park, the portion inside Lassen Volcanic National Park is federally maintained and is not included in the state route logs. The road then descends out of the park and heads northwest, finally terminating at Interstate 5 at the foot of Mount Shasta at around 3,600 feet (1,100 m).

== Route description ==
Route 89 is defined in section 389 of the California Streets and Highways Code. The definition omits the federally maintained segment through Lassen Volcanic National Park, as well as the concurrencies with various other routes instead of duplicating those segments in those other routes' definitions in the code:

Route 89 is from:
(a) Route 395 near Coleville to Route 88 via the vicinity of Markleeville.
(b) Route 88 near Picketts Junction to Route 50 near Meyers.
(c) Route 50 near May's Junction to Route 80 via Tallac, Emerald Bay, McKinney's, Tahoe City, and the Truckee River.
(d) Route 80 near Truckee to Route 70 near Blairsden.
(e) Route 70 near Indian Falls to Route 36 near Deer Creek Pass.
(f) Route 36 near Morgan Summit to Lassen Volcanic National Park.
(g) Route 44 to Route 5 near Mt. Shasta.

SR 89 begins at an intersection with US 395. The highway goes west through a few switchbacks before crossing into Alpine County and the Humboldt-Toiyabe National Forest. The route over Monitor Pass is typically closed during the winter due to snow accumulation. SR 89 continues by Heenan Lake before intersecting with the eastern end of SR 4 and turning northwest, passing through Markleeville. SR 89 continues northwest to the town of Woodfords, where it turns west, running concurrently with SR 88 for a brief distance before turning into El Dorado County. The section of SR 89 from SR 88 north to US 50 is co-signed as US 50 Alternate for use as a detour for when US 50 closes.

The highway continues north to Meyers, where it runs concurrently with US 50 into the city of South Lake Tahoe. SR 89 continues along the western shore of Lake Tahoe, where it passes through Camp Richardson, Emerald Bay, Meeks Bay, Pomins, and Tahoma. After crossing into Placer County, SR 89 passes through Chambers Lodge, Homewood, Tahoe Pines, Skyland, Timberland, Pineland, and Tahoe Tavern before coming to an intersection with SR 28, where SR 89 continues to the west, away from the lake. The road curves to the north through Tahoe National Forest before crossing into Nevada County and the town of Truckee. This portion of the highway has been designated the "10th Mountain Division Memorial Highway", honoring the US Army division that lost 992 soldiers during the Italian Campaign in World War II.

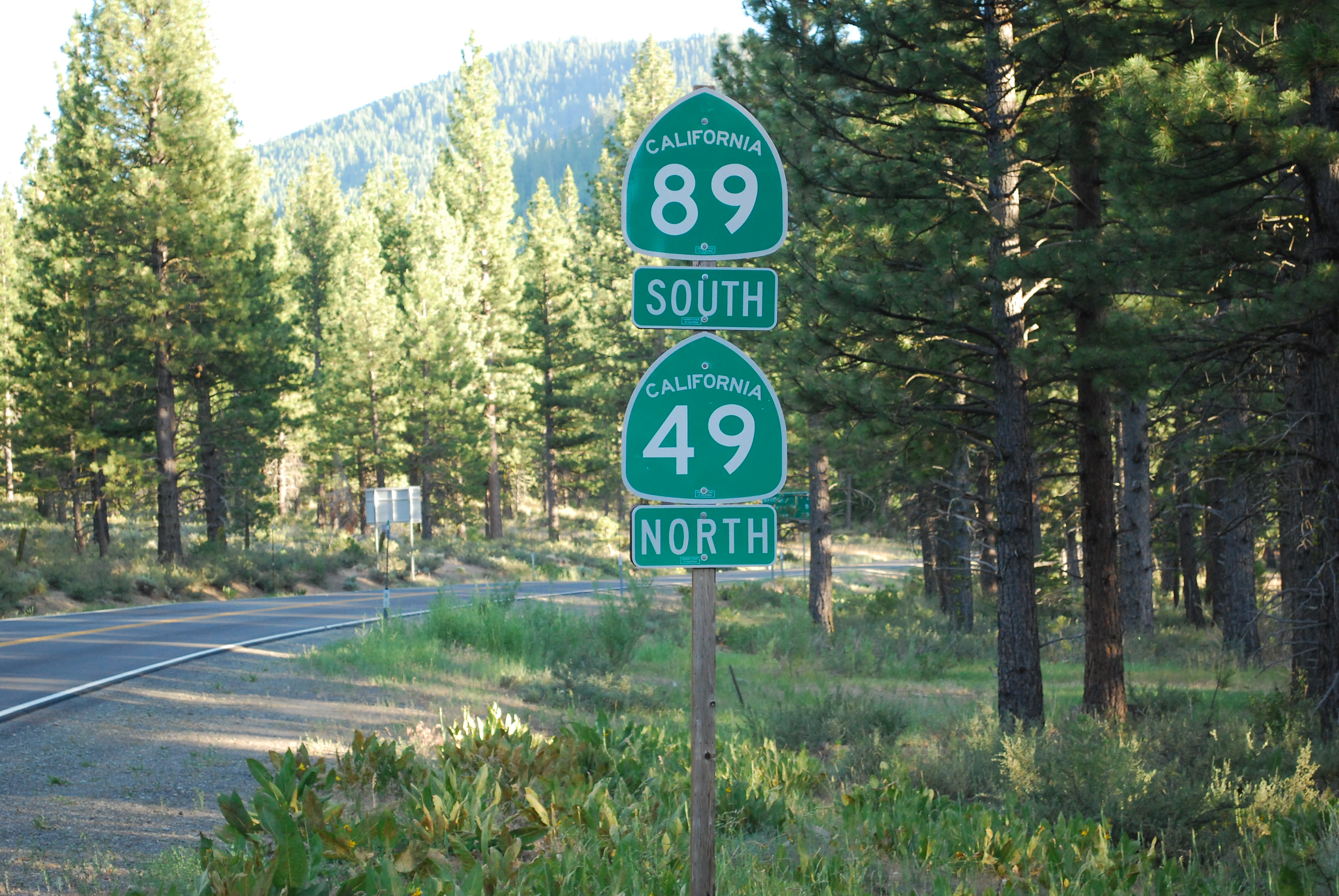
SR 89 (South) briefly joins SR 49 (North) in Sierra County, an example of a wrong-way concurrency

SR 89 runs concurrently with I-80 eastbound briefly before exiting to the north and continuing through Truckee and passing near Prosser Creek Reservoir outside of the town limits. SR 89 continues through Hobart Mills before crossing into Sierra County and continuing northwest to Randolph and Sierraville, where it shares a wrong-way concurrency with SR 49 through the town of Sattley; they then intersect CR A23 before SR 89 splits off to the northwest. SR 89 continues through Calpine before crossing into Plumas County.

SR 89 continues through Clio and Graeagle before running concurrently with SR 70 through Plumas National Forest, passing through Blairsden, Feather River Inn, Cromberg, Spring Garden, Massack (where SR 70 and 89 have a rest area), East Quincy, and the city of Quincy. SR 70 and SR 89 continue north through Keddie before SR 89 splits off to the north and passes through Indian Falls, Crescent Mills, Greenville, and Canyondam. The section of SR 89 from SR 70 north to Crescent Mills was built over the abandoned railway bed of the Indian Valley Railroad. SR 89 intersects with the south end of SR 147 before paralleling the southern shore of Lake Almanor and running concurrently with SR 36 westbound, crossing into Tehama County and Lassen National Forest.

SR 36 and SR 89 intersect the northern terminus of SR 32 and SR 172 before SR 36 splits off to the west and SR 89 enters Lassen Volcanic National Park. The SR 89 state designation officially does not run through the national park, and this segment is directly under the park's jurisdiction instead of Caltrans. When it is open, a park fee is charged. The segment through the park is typically closed during the winter due to very heavy snowfall and snowpack. Outside the other park entrance in the northwest corner in Shasta County, SR 89 forms a concurrency with SR 44, heading northeast to Old Station.

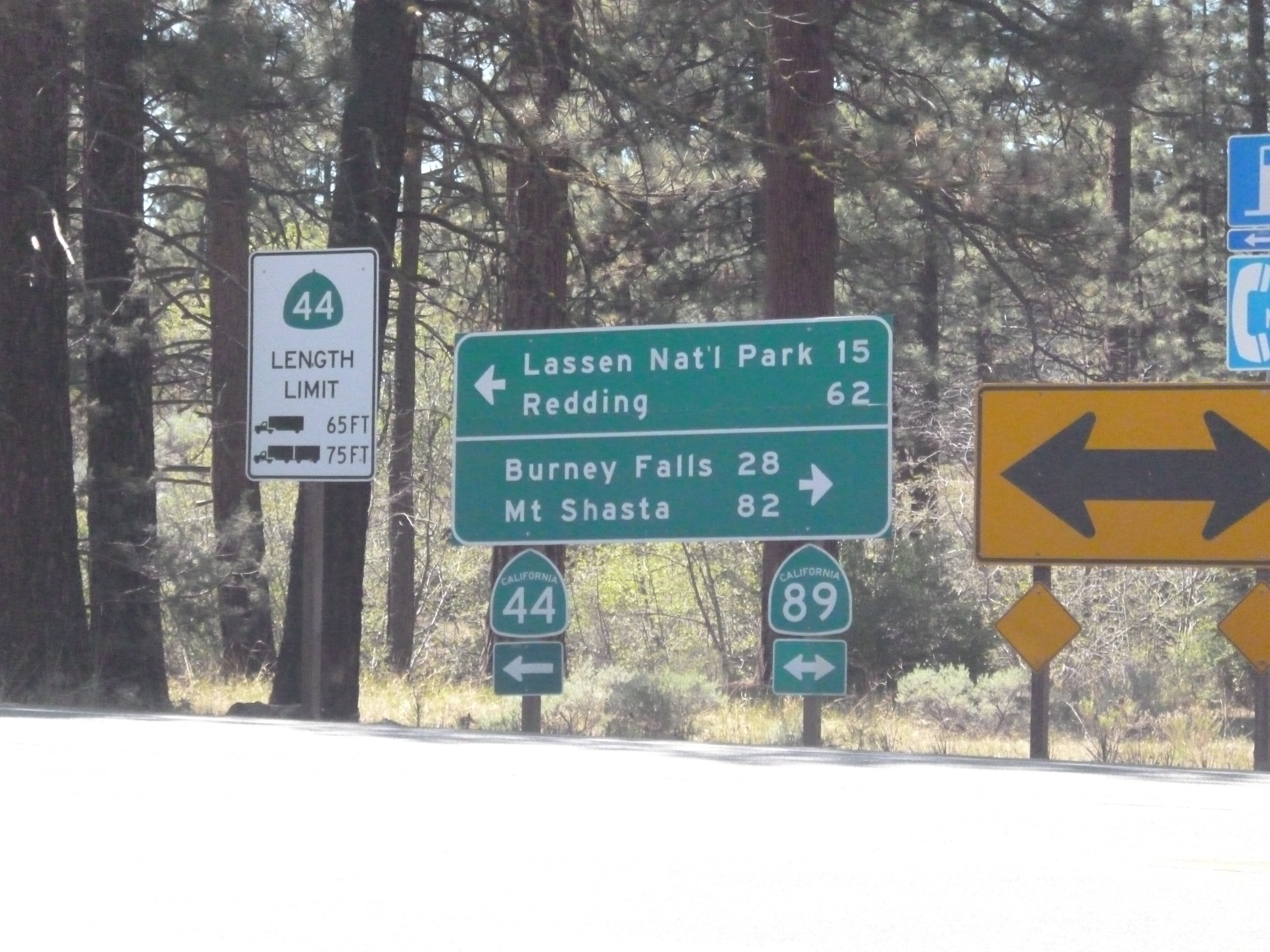
SR 44 and SR 89 intersection

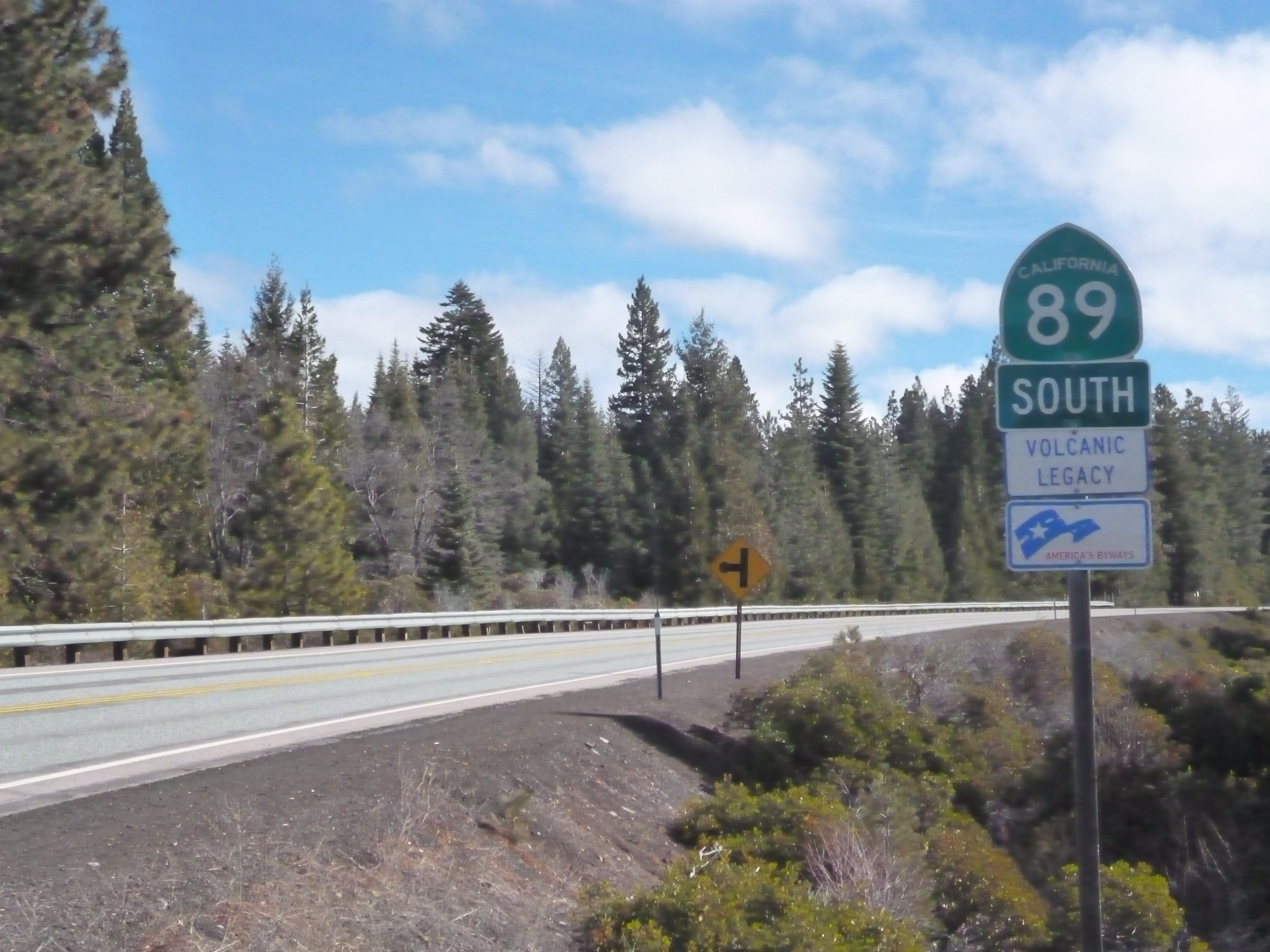
The northern end of SR 89 at Mt. Shasta

After splitting from SR 44 at Old Station, SR 89 continues north through Hat Creek and Doyles Corner before intersecting SR 299. The highway passes through Four Corners and Cayton before intersecting CR A19 and crossing into Siskiyou County. SR 89 briefly passes through the Klamath National Forest and Bartle and McCloud before coming to an interchange with I-5. SR 89 then merges with Mount Shasta Boulevard and terminates just outside the Mount Shasta City city limits.

One point of interest along California State Route 89 includes the Pony Express remount station in Woodfords, the Lake Tahoe Outlet Gates in Tahoe City (control of these gates was the source of the two-decade "Tahoe Water War" between lakeshore owners and downstream Truckee River water users), Plumas-Eureka State Park (containing Johnsville, a well-preserved '49er town, and Pioneer Ski Area, the first sport skiing area in the Western hemisphere), Lake Almanor and Lassen Volcanic National Park.

Many other points of interest, including Brokeoff Mountain, Sulphur Works, Emerald Lake, Lake Helen, Bumpass Hell, Lassen Peak and Summit Lake are also located on this highway.

SR 89 is part of the California Freeway and Expressway System, and north of the southern SR 44 junction is part of the National Highway System, a network of highways that are considered essential to the country's economy, defense, and mobility by the Federal Highway Administration. SR 89 is eligible for the State Scenic Highway System; however, it is only a scenic highway as designated by Caltrans from the El Dorado-Placer county line to a point 3.2 miles west of the US 395 junction, meaning that it is a substantial section of highway passing through a "memorable landscape" with no "visual intrusions", where the potential designation has gained popular favor with the community. From the junction with SR 147, through the park and including the gap on SR 44, to its terminus at I-5, SR 89 is part of the Volcanic Legacy Scenic Byway, a National Scenic Byway. The segment of SR 89 from I-80 in Truckee to SR 49 through Sattley also forms part of the Yuba-Donner Scenic Byway, a National Forest Scenic Byway.

== Major intersections ==
Except where prefixed with a letter, postmiles were measured on the road as it was in 1964, based on the alignment that existed at the time, and do not necessarily reflect current mileage. R reflects a realignment in the route since then, M indicates a second realignment, L refers to an overlap due to a correction or change, and T indicates postmiles classified as temporary. Segments that remain unconstructed or have been relinquished to local control may be omitted. The numbers reset at county lines; the start and end postmiles in each county are given in the county column.

County	Location	Postmile	Exit	Destinations	Notes
Mono; MNO 0.00-7.60		0.00		US 395 – Carson City, Coleville, Los Angeles	Southern terminus
Mono; MNO 0.00-7.60		0.21		Northbound winter closure gate	
Alpine; ALP 0.00-23.97		1.90		Monitor Pass (closed in winters), elevation 8,314 feet (2,534 m)	
Alpine; ALP 0.00-23.97		9.96		Southbound winter closure gate	
Alpine; ALP 0.00-23.97		9.96		SR 4 west – Angels Camp, Stockton	SR 4 west through Ebbetts Pass closed in winters
Alpine; ALP 0.00-23.97	Woodfords	21.37 19.22 (Note: Indicates that the postmile represents the distance along SR 88 rather than SR 89.)		SR 88 east – Minden	Southern end of SR 88 overlap
Alpine; ALP 0.00-23.97		13.40 21.38		SR 88 west – Kirkwood, Jackson	Northern end of SR 88 overlap; former southern end of US 50 Alt. overlap
Alpine; ALP 0.00-23.97		23.65		Luther Pass, elevation 7,740 feet (2,360 m)	
El Dorado; ED 0.00-27.41	Meyers	8.55 70.62 (Note: Indicates that the postmile represents the distance along US 50 rather than SR 89.)		US 50 west – Placerville	Southern end of US 50 overlap; former northern end of US 50 Alt. overlap; roundabout
El Dorado; ED 0.00-27.41	South Lake Tahoe	75.45 8.56		US 50 east (Lake Tahoe Boulevard) – Stateline	Northern end of US 50 overlap
Placer; PLA 0.00-21.68	Tahoe City	T8.57		SR 28 east (River Road east) – Tahoe City, Kings Beach	Roundabout
Nevada; NEV 0.00-8.70	Truckee	0.49 14.16 (Note: Indicates that the postmile represents the distance along I-80 rather than SR 89.)	185	I-80 west (Alan S. Hart Freeway west) / unsigned SR 89 spur to Donner Pass Road – Sacramento	Southern end of I-80 overlap; dumbbell interchange
Nevada; NEV 0.00-8.70	Truckee	14.97	186	Central Truckee (Donner Pass Road)	No northbound entrance
Nevada; NEV 0.00-8.70	Truckee	16.29	188A	Truckee (Truckee Way)	Northbound exit and southbound entrance
Nevada; NEV 0.00-8.70	Truckee	16.60 R0.62	188B	I-80 east (Alan S. Hart Freeway east) / SR 267 south – Lake Tahoe, Reno	Northern end of I-80 overlap; interchange; westbound I-80 exit 188
Sierra; SIE 0.00-29.58		3.75	Little Truckee Summit, elevation 6,399 feet (1,950 m)		
Sierra; SIE 0.00-29.58	Sierraville	15.06		SR 49 north – Loyalton	Eastern end of SR 49 overlap
Sierra; SIE 0.00-29.58		19.96		SR 49 south – Bassetts, Sierra City, Downieville	Western end of SR 49 overlap
Plumas; PLU 0.00-R42.19	Blairsden	8.71 R66.63 (Note: Indicates that the postmile represents the distance along SR 70 rather than SR 89.)		SR 70 east – Portola	Southern end of SR 70 overlap
Plumas; PLU 0.00-R42.19		49.80	Massack Rest Area		
Plumas; PLU 0.00-R42.19		33.03 8.72		SR 70 west – Oroville, Marysville	Northern end of SR 70 overlap
Plumas; PLU 0.00-R42.19	Canyondam	29.59		SR 147 north – Westwood, Susanville, Lake Almanor East Shore Peninsula	
Plumas; PLU 0.00-R42.19		R42.19 6.29 (Note: Indicates that the postmile represents the distance along SR 36 rather than SR 89.)		SR 36 east – Chester	Southern end of SR 36 overlap
Tehama; TEH R0.10-4.40		99.94		SR 32 west – Chico	
Tehama; TEH R0.10-4.40	Morgan Springs	91.25		SR 172 west – Mill Creek	
Tehama; TEH R0.10-4.40		87.68 R0.10		SR 36 west – Red Bluff	Northern end of SR 36 overlap
Tehama; TEH R0.10-4.40	Lassen Volcanic National Park	4.40 0.0 (Note: Indicates that the mileage represents the distance inside Lassen Volcanic National Park, where no state maintenance exists.)		Northern end of state maintenance at the eastern park boundary	
Tehama; TEH R0.10-4.40	Lassen Volcanic National Park	0.9		Southwest Entrance Station; park fee or annual pass required for entry	
Tehama–Shasta county line	Lassen Volcanic National Park	1.9– 28.0		Segment one mile from each park entrance is typically closed in winters	
Shasta; SHA 0.00-43.35	Lassen Volcanic National Park	29.0		Manzanita Lake Entrance Station; park fee or annual pass required for entry	
Shasta; SHA 0.00-43.35	Lassen Volcanic National Park	29.6 R49.35 (Note: Indicates that the postmile represents the distance along SR 44 rather than SR 89.)		Southern end of state maintenance at the western park boundary	
Shasta; SHA 0.00-43.35		29.6 R49.35		SR 44 west – Redding	Southern end of SR 44 overlap
Shasta; SHA 0.00-43.35	Old Station	62.69 0.00		SR 44 east – Susanville, Reno	Northern end of SR 44 overlap
Shasta; SHA 0.00-43.35		21.72		SR 299 – Fall River Mills, Alturas, Burney, Redding	
Siskiyou; SIS 0.00-R34.62		R34.62		I-5 – Portland	Interchange; northbound exit and southbound entrances, no exit to I-5 south; I-5 exit 736
Siskiyou; SIS 0.00-R34.62		R34.62		I-5 BL south to I-5 south – Redding	Interchange; northern terminus; no access to/from I-5 BL north
1.000 mi = 1.609 km; 1.000 km = 0.621 mi: Concurrency terminus; Incomplete access; Tolled
