= Eastern California =

- Region of California
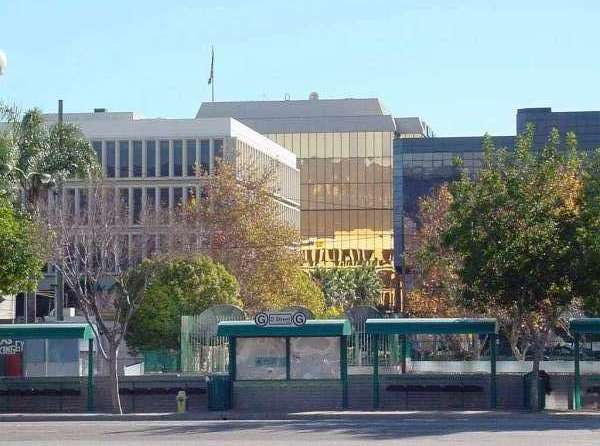
- Downtown San Bernardino, anchor of the largest metro area in East California and 12th in the United States

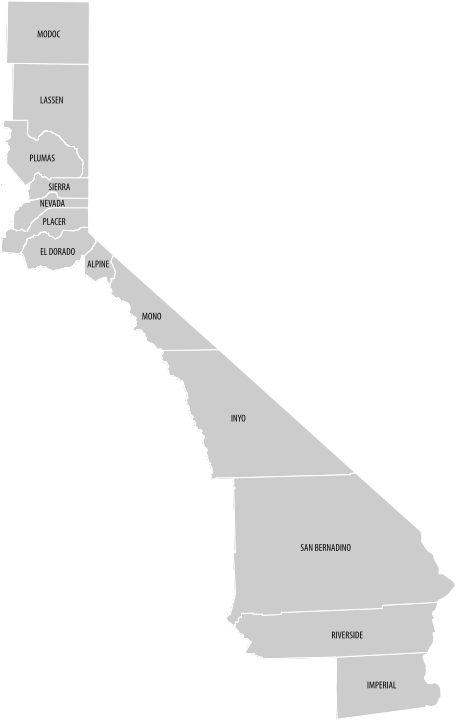
- Counties on California's Eastern Border
- Country: United States
- State: California
- Time zone: Pacific Standard Time
  - Summer (DST): Pacific Daylight Time
- Area codes: 530, 442/760, 909, 951

Eastern California is a region defined as either the strip to the east of the crest of the Sierra Nevada or as the easternmost counties of California.

== Demographics ==
According to the 2020 census, the population of the eastern border counties of California was 5,575,577. However, 4,599,839 (82.5%) lived in San Bernardino and Riverside counties, which are geographically very large and whose populations are concentrated near Los Angeles and Orange counties to the southwest.

== Culture and history ==
Eastern California's history differs significantly from that of the coastal regions and the Central Valley. Northeastern California is very sparsely populated (except for the area around Lake Tahoe): the three least-populated counties of California lie in the northeast. The area tends to be politically conservative, much like the rest of the rural Western United States. However, the counties of San Bernardino and Riverside form the 13th-largest metropolitan area of the United States, and El Dorado and Placer Counties are part of the Greater Sacramento area and are culturally influenced by their respective metropolitan areas. Imperial County in the Southeast, though rural and agrarian, is heavily Democratic and has ties with the Mexicali Valley to the south.

Northeastern California has had strong ties to Nevada, with the exact boundary between the two states having once been a matter of dispute. Residents of an area near Susanville, California tried to break away from the state in 1856, first by declaring themselves part of the Nataqua Territory and then through annexation to Nevada. The two states further squabbled over ownership of Susanville in 1863. The town of Aurora, Nevada, was temporarily the county seat of both Mono County, California, and Esmeralda County, Nevada. Finally, the line between the two states was settled by a survey in 1892. Over time, droughts and wildfires have increased in frequency and become less seasonal and more year-round, further straining the region's water security.

There are many unique historical aspects of Eastern California including the Manzanar internment camp and the historical Carson and Colorado Railway.

== Geography ==
The easternmost counties of California are (from north to south):

- Modoc County
- Lassen County
- Plumas County
- Sierra County
- Nevada County
- Placer County
- El Dorado County
- Alpine County
- Mono County
- Inyo County
- San Bernardino County
- Riverside County
- Imperial County

Major cities within this region (listed by population) include Riverside, San Bernardino, Ontario, Rancho Cucamonga, Roseville, Corona, Victorville, Temecula, Indio, Hemet, Palm Springs, El Centro, Calexico, Barstow, South Lake Tahoe, Blythe, Susanville, Truckee, Grass Valley, Auburn, Placerville, Mammoth Lakes, Needles, Bishop, and Alturas.

== Cities larger than 50,000 population ==
The following incorporated places have a population of 50,000 or greater, according to the 2020 census:

=== Placer County ===
- Roseville: 147,773
- Rocklin: 71,601

=== San Bernardino County ===
- Apple Valley: 75,791
- Chino: 91,403
- Chino Hills: 78,411
- Colton: 53,909
- Fontana: 208,393
- Hesperia: 99,818
- Highland: 56,999
- Ontario: 175,265
- Rancho Cucamonga: 174,453
- Redlands: 73,168
- Rialto: 104,026
- San Bernardino: 222,101
- Upland: 79,040
- Victorville: 134,810
- Yucaipa: 54,542

=== Riverside County ===
- Beaumont: 53,036
- Cathedral City: 51,493
- Corona: 157,136
- Eastvale: 69,757
- Hemet: 89,833
- Indio: 89,137
- Jurupa Valley: 105,053
- Lake Elsinore: 70,265
- Menifee: 102,527
- Moreno Valley: 208,634
- Murrieta: 110,949
- Palm Desert: 51,163
- Perris: 78,700
- Riverside: 314,998
- San Jacinto: 53,898
- Temecula: 110,003

== Geology ==
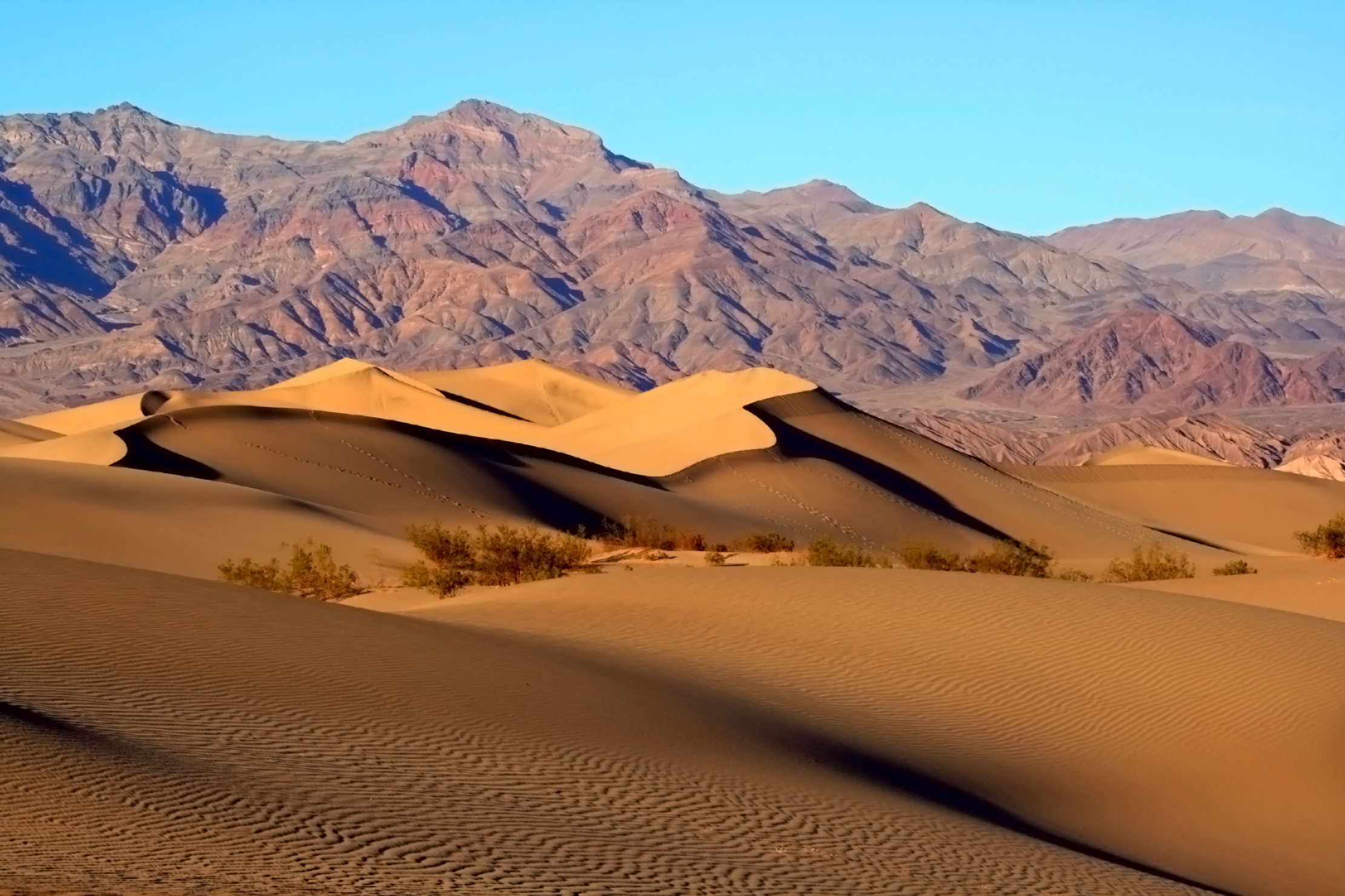
Sand dunes in Death Valley

Because Eastern California is generally in the rain shadow of the Sierra Nevada or the Transverse Ranges, the climate is extremely dry and can be considered a desert. Indeed, the hottest and lowest area in North America lies in Death Valley, in the heart of Eastern California.

Geologically, Eastern California is mostly part of the Basin and Range Province, marked by crustal extension, with horsts and grabens. Volcanism is also evident in this region.

== Climate ==
The majority of Eastern California experiences two seasons, a long, dry summer and a milder winter in which the rain is concentrated. Most higher elevations experience four distinct seasons. There are some areas where the weather is very diverse. The Sierra Nevada mountain range has larger amounts of snowfall, while the Imperial Valley has more arid conditions. The Sierra Nevada's average temperature is around 47 °F (8 °C) and the Imperial Valley is on average 73 °F (23 °C). A record-breaking heat temperature was recorded in Death Valley, at 134 °F (57 °C) on July 10, 1913. With its low and often sporadic rainfall, California is susceptible to drought, and in many parts of the state including Eastern California, there is very high fire danger and there have been several devastating wildfires.

== Economy ==
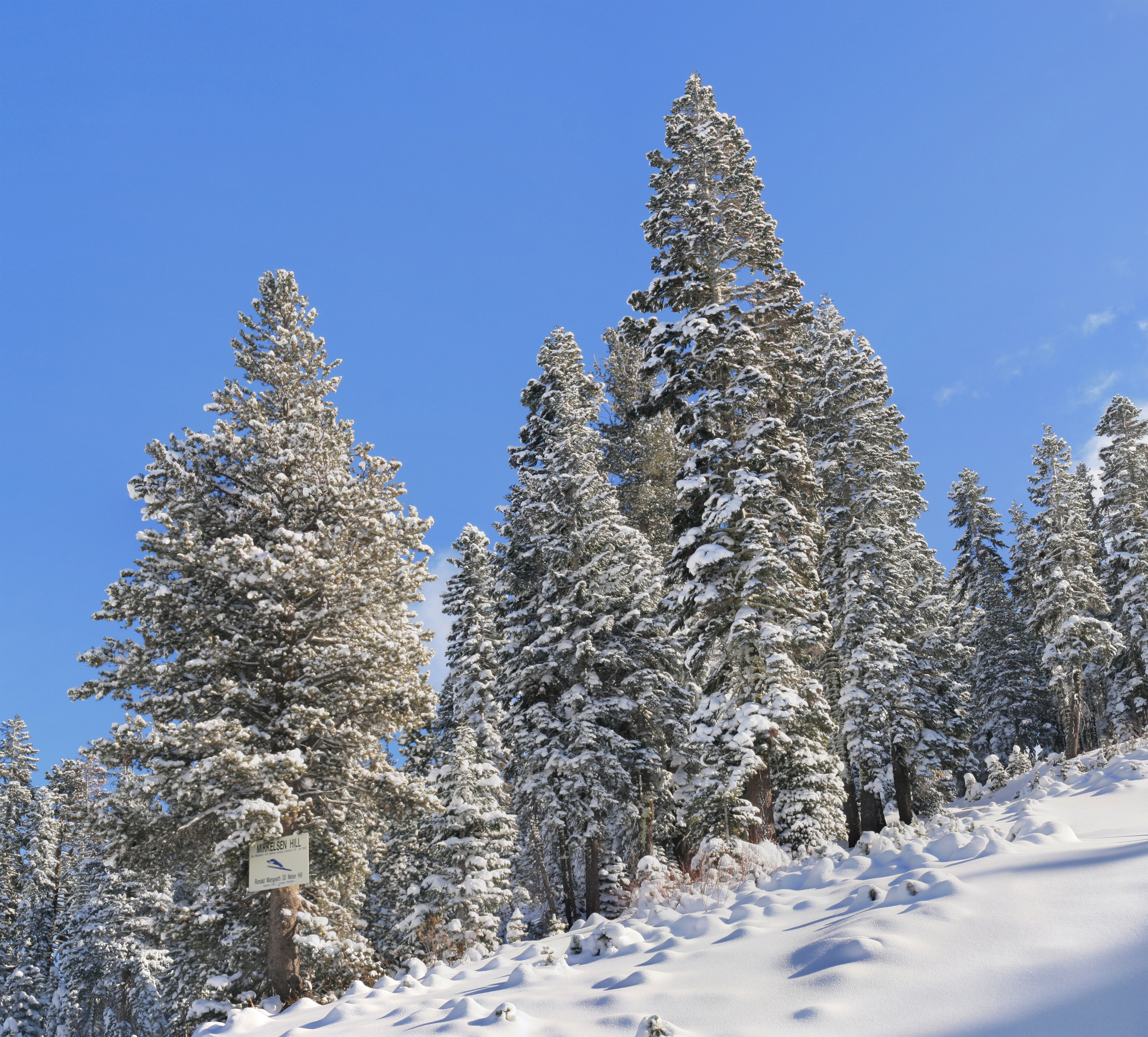
Snowy forest at Boreal Mountain Resort

The northern counties of Eastern California are heavily timbered areas. The timber industry is a major contributor to the economy from sale of timber and forest products and the number of jobs that it provides. These timbered areas not only provide valuable income, but are also the main growing sector for the economy for recreation and tourism. In the Sierra Nevada National Forests they experience 50 million recreational visitor days per year. When California became a state, it was one of the leading producers of these timber and forest products. Since then, it has held the third place for the top producer of softwoods since the 1940s. In California there were five counties that contributed to 55 percent of the wood harvested for the state. One of those counties, Plumas, is located in Eastern California.

== Transportation ==
=== Major highways ===
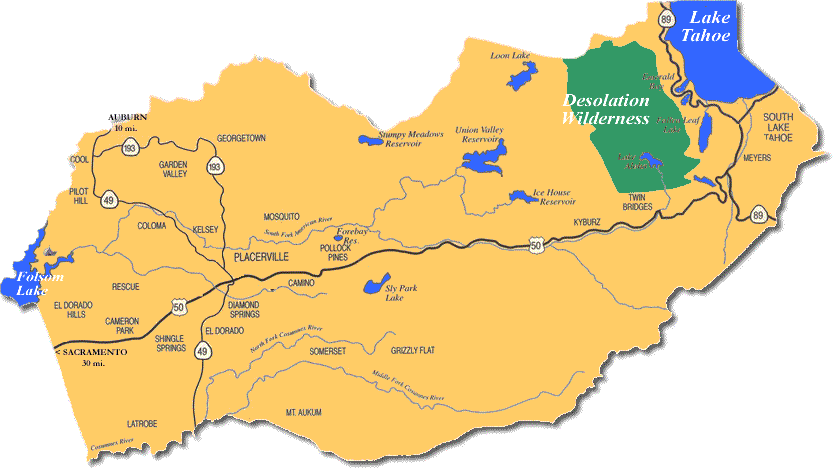
Map of El Dorado County in Northern California

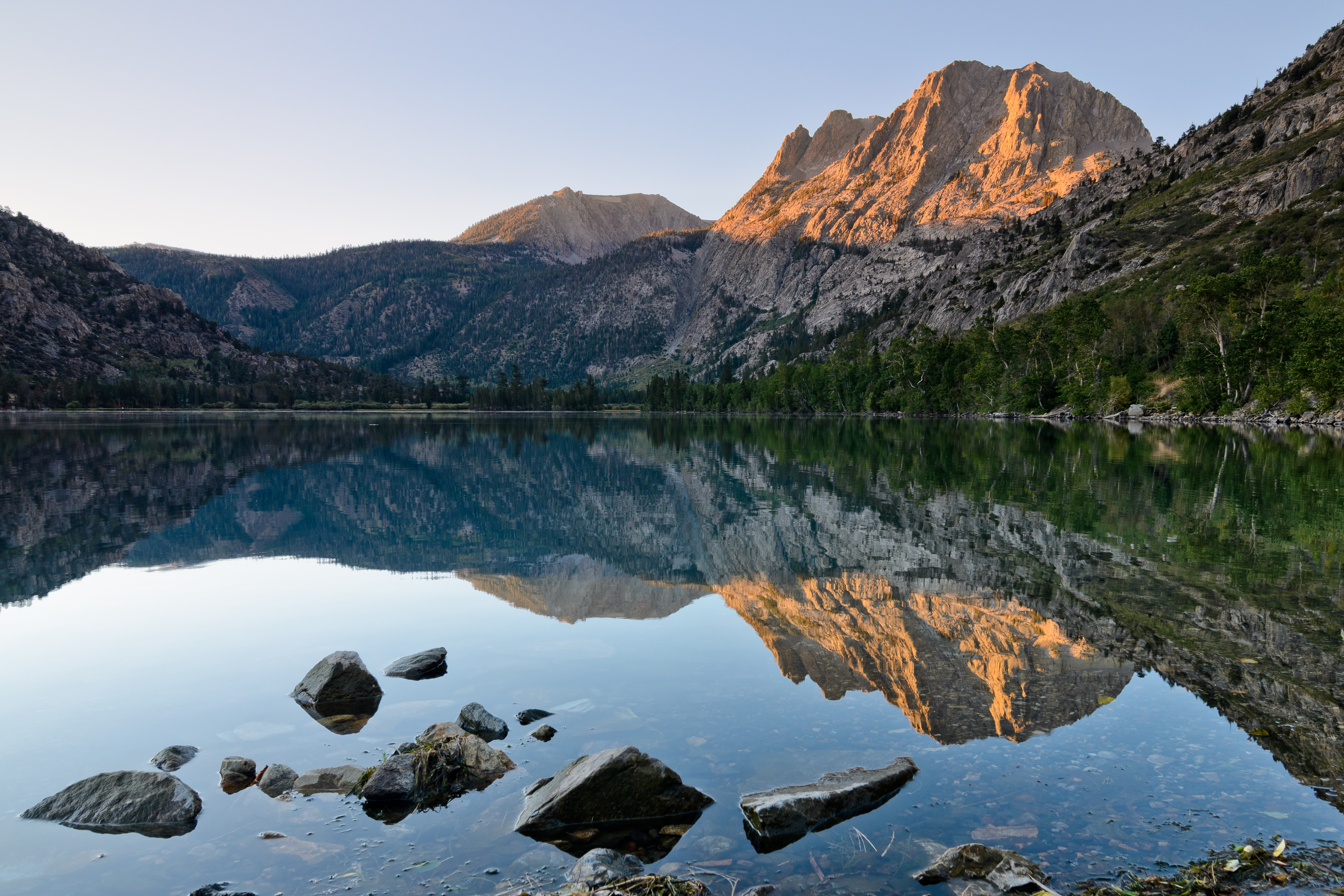
View from State Route 158

- Modoc County
  - U.S. Route 395
  - State Route 139
  - State Route 299
- Lassen County
  - U.S. Route 395
  - State Route 36
  - State Route 44
  - State Route 139
  - State Route 299
- Plumas County
  - State Route 36
  - State Route 49
  - State Route 70
  - State Route 89
  - State Route 284
- Sierra County
  - U.S. Route 395
  - Interstate 80
  - State Route 49
  - State Route 89
- Nevada County
  - Interstate 80
  - State Route 20
  - State Route 49
  - State Route 89
  - State Route 174
- Placer County
  - Interstate 80
  - State Route 28
  - State Route 49
  - State Route 65
  - State Route 89
  - State Route 174
  - State Route 267
- El Dorado County
  - U.S. Route 50
  - State Route 49
  - State Route 89
  - State Route 193
  - Luther Pass
- Alpine County
  - State Route 4
  - State Route 88
  - State Route 89
- Mono County
  - U.S. Route 6
  - U.S. Route 395
  - State Route 108
  - State Route 120
  - State Route 158
  - State Route 167
  - State Route 182
  - State Route 270
- Inyo County
  - U.S. Route 6
  - U.S. Route 395
  - State Route 127
  - State Route 136
  - State Route 168
  - State Route 178
  - State Route 190
- San Bernardino County
  - I-10
  - I-15
  - I-15 BL
  - I-40
  - I-215
  - US 95
  - US 395
  - SR 2
  - SR 18
  - SR 38
  - SR 58
  - SR 60
  - SR 62
  - SR 66
  - SR 71
  - SR 83
  - SR 127
  - SR 138
  - SR 142
  - SR 173
  - SR 178
  - SR 189
  - SR 247
  - SR 259
  - SR 330
- Riverside County
  - I-10
  - I-10 BL
  - I-15
  - I-215
  - U.S. Route 95
  - Historic U.S. Route 99
  - Historic U.S. Route 395
  - State Route 60
  - State Route 62
  - State Route 71
  - State Route 74
  - State Route 78
  - State Route 79
  - State Route 86
  - State Route 91
  - State Route 111
  - State Route 177
  - State Route 243
  - State Route 371

== Educational institutions ==
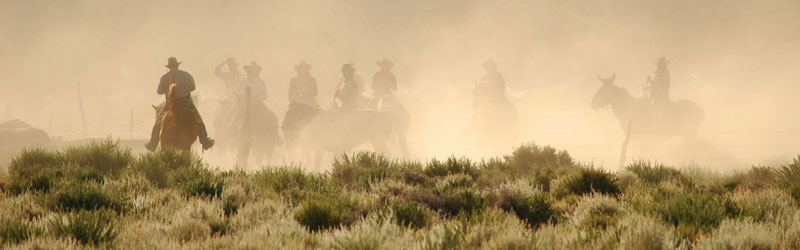
Students at Deep Springs College driving cattle

=== Private institutions ===
- William Jessup University
- Brandman University
- National University (campuses in Ontario and San Bernardino)
- Deep Springs College
- Loma Linda University
- University of Redlands

=== Community colleges ===
- Lassen Community College
- Feather River College
- Sierra College
- Folsom Lake College
- Lake Tahoe Community College
- Cerro Coso Community College
- Palo Verde Community College
- Barstow Community College
- Chaffey College
- Copper Mountain College
- Crafton Hills College
- San Bernardino Valley College
- University of La Verne
- Victor Valley College
- Mt. San Jacinto College
- College of the Desert

=== Public institutions ===
- California State University, San Bernardino
- University of California, Riverside

=== National Parks ===
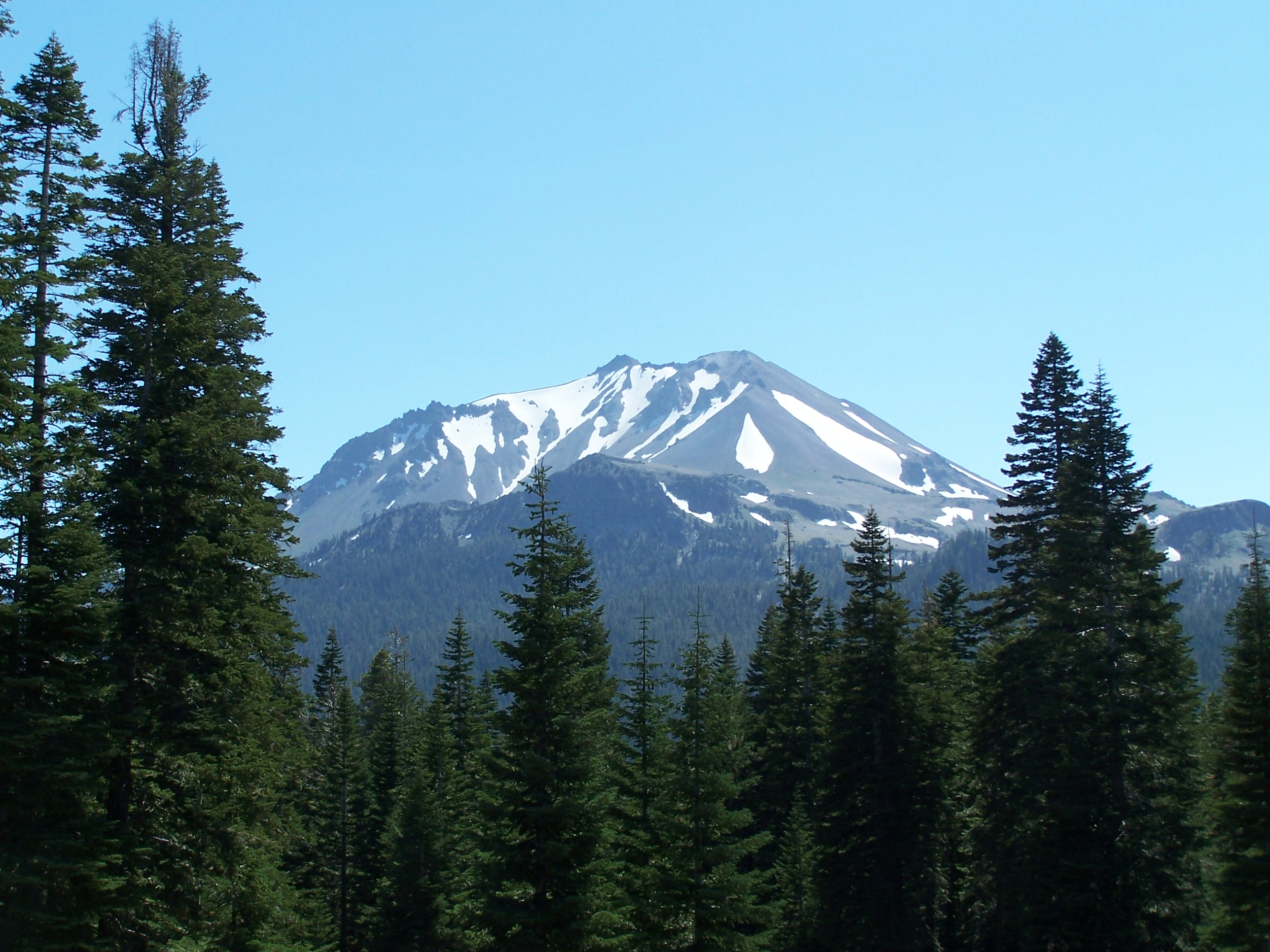
Mount Lassen

- Death Valley National Park
- Lassen National Park
- Lava Beds National Monument
- Devils Postpile
- Manzanar
- Mojave National Preserve
- Old Spanish National Historic Trail
- Tule Lake Unit, World War II Valor in the Pacific National Monument
- Joshua Tree National Park

== See also ==
- Deserts of California
