= California State Route 172 =

Highway in California

State Route 172

- Map of Tehama County in northern California with SR 172 highlighted in red

Route information
- Maintained by Caltrans
- Length: 8.917 mi (14.351 km)
- Restrictions: Segment between Mineral and Mill Creek is typically closed in winter.

Major junctions
- West end: SR 36 at Mineral
- East end: SR 36 / SR 89 at Morgan Springs

Location
- Country: United States
- State: California
- Counties: Tehama

Highway system
- State highways in California; Interstate; US; State; Scenic; History; Pre‑1964; Unconstructed; Deleted; Freeways
← SR 171	→ SR 173

State Route 172 (SR 172) is a state highway in the U.S. state of California in Tehama County. It is a loop route off of State Route 36 that serves the Mill Creek area of Lassen National Forest.

== Route description ==
Route 172 is defined in section 472 of the California Streets and Highways Code, and that the highway is "from Route 36 at Mineral to Route 36 near Morgan Summit".

SR 172 begins at a junction with SR 36 in Mineral and heads southeast through Lassen National Forest. The route then turns south, crossing the South Fork Battle Creek and entering a wooded area. The road then winds eastward through the forest, roughly parallel to Mill Creek. SR 172 then turns northward along Mill Creek and heads back toward SR 36 in Morgan Springs, its eastern terminus.

The segment between Mineral and Mill Creek is not plowed during the winter and thus is typically closed during snowy conditions.

SR 172 is not part of the National Highway System, a network of highways that are considered essential to the country's economy, defense, and mobility by the Federal Highway Administration.

== Major intersections ==
Except where prefixed with a letter, postmiles were measured on the road as it was in 1964, based on the alignment that existed at the time, and do not necessarily reflect current mileage. Postmile prefixes include: R reflecting a realignment in the route since then, M indicating a second realignment, L referring to an overlap due to a correction or change, and T indicating postmiles classified as temporary. Segments that remain unconstructed or have been relinquished to local control may be omitted. The entire route is in Tehama County.

Location	Postmile	Destinations	Notes
Mineral	0.00	SR 36 – Chester, Susanville	West end of SR 172
		Segment between Mineral and Mill Creek typically closes in winter	
Morgan Springs	8.92	SR 36 / SR 89 – Red Bluff, Susanville	East end of SR 172
1.000 mi = 1.609 km; 1.000 km = 0.621 mi
