= Meyers, California =

Unincorporated community in California, United States

- Unincorporated community Census-designated place
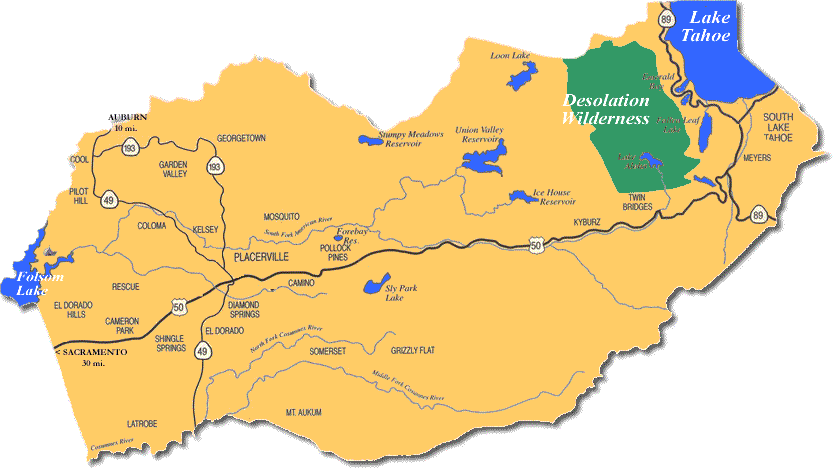
- Meyers along U.S. Route 50 in a map of El Dorado County

- Location in California Meyers (the United States)
- Coordinates: 38°50′3.69″N 120°01′7.81″W
- Country: United States
- State: California
- County: El Dorado

Area
  - Total: 2.513 sq mi (6.51 km^{2})
  - Land: 2.499 sq mi (6.47 km^{2})
  - Water: 0.014 sq mi (0.036 km^{2})
- Elevation: 6,378 ft (1,944 m)

Population (2020)
  - Total: 2,163
  - Density: 865.5/sq mi (334.2/km^{2})
- Time zone: UTC-8 (Pacific (PST))
  - Summer (DST): UTC-7 (PDT)
- ZIP code: 96150
- Area codes: 530, 837
- GNIS feature ID: 2804404

California Historical Landmark
- Official name: Yank's Station
- Reference no.: 708

Meyers (also Yanks, Yank's Station, and Tahoe Paradise) is a small unincorporated community and census-designated place (CDP) in El Dorado County, California, United States, along U.S. Route 50 in the northern Sierra Nevada. It is 6 miles (10 km) south of South Lake Tahoe in the Lake Tahoe area and lies at an elevation of 6,378 feet (1,944 metres). As of the 2020 census, Meyers had a population of 2,163. Established in 1851, Meyers started out as a stagecoach stop, trading post and Pony Express station. The town is now registered as California Historical Landmark #708. It serves as a popular stop on the way into and out of the Tahoe Basin for travelers on U.S. Route 50 and California Route 89.

== History ==
Martin Smith, the town founder, opened a trading post and inn on the Placerville-Carson Road in 1851. Eight years later, Ephraim "Yank" Clement and his wife Lydia purchased the station and outbuildings from Smith and George Douglas, who had run the station as a hostelry and stagecoach stop. The Clements enlarged the station into a three-story, fourteen-room way station which included a large stable and hay barn with large corrals across the road.

The station served as a Pony Express stop up until October 26, 1861. Upon completion of the wagon road over Kingsbury Grade, the Pony Express route continued from Mormon (Genoa) Station to Friday's Station and then along the south shore of Lake Tahoe, stopping at Yank's Station Toll House near Myers (original spelling) on U.S. 50. It then continued on to Strawberry Station. A USGS topographic map from 1891 shows Yanks near present-day Camp Richarson. Meyers was its own distinct locale.

With both a trading post and a hotel, the station also served as a stage stop. The toll house was pushed off its foundation by floodwaters and is now situated on blocks next to the Tahoe Paradise Museum. In 1873, George Henry Dudley Meyers purchased the property. The newly rebuilt station thrived for decades as a hotel and store. On November 25, 1938, the building was destroyed in the Meyers town fire.

Earlier (in 1904), a post office opened south of the station. The post office closed in 1957, only to reopen in 1958. It was adjacent to the Lincoln Highway Sierra Nevada Southern Route by 1916, and was renamed Tahoe Paradise in 1962. By 1896, a railroad had been connected that ran up Lake Valley from a landing in Bijou.

On June 10, 1991, Jaycee Lee Dugard was kidnapped in the community. She was confined for 18 years in Antioch, California, and was found alive in 2009 in Berkeley.

== Climate ==
Climate data for Meyers, California (1981–2010)
Month	Jan	Feb	Mar	Apr	May	Jun	Jul	Aug	Sep	Oct	Nov	Dec	Year
Mean daily maximum °F (°C)	41.8 (5.4)	42.7 (5.9)	46.7 (8.2)	52.5 (11.4)	61.4 (16.3)	71.3 (21.8)	79.7 (26.5)	79.2 (26.2)	72.8 (22.7)	61.5 (16.4)	49.8 (9.9)	41.7 (5.4)	58.4 (14.7)
Mean daily minimum °F (°C)	17.5 (−8.1)	18.5 (−7.5)	22.9 (−5.1)	26.8 (−2.9)	32.5 (0.3)	37.4 (3.0)	41.9 (5.5)	40.5 (4.7)	34.9 (1.6)	28.6 (−1.9)	22.5 (−5.3)	17.0 (−8.3)	28.4 (−2.0)
Average precipitation inches (mm)	7.13 (181)	6.87 (174)	6.51 (165)	3.32 (84)	2.49 (63)	0.90 (23)	0.29 (7.4)	0.37 (9.4)	0.56 (14)	2.40 (61)	3.59 (91)	7.81 (198)	42.24 (1,070.8)
Average snowfall inches (cm)	43.5 (110)	40.3 (102)	37.7 (96)	23.4 (59)	4.0 (10)	0.1 (0.25)	0.0 (0.0)	0.0 (0.0)	0.1 (0.25)	0.9 (2.3)	24.3 (62)	37.1 (94)	211.4 (535.8)
Source: WRCC

== Demographics ==
Historical population
Census	Pop.	Note	%±
2020	2,163		—
U.S. Decennial Census; 1850–1870 1880-1890; 1900 1910 1920; 1930 1940 1950; 1960 1970 1980; 1990 2000 2010; 2020

Meyers first appeared as a census designated place in the 2020 U.S. census

=== 2020 census ===
As of the 2020 census, Meyers had a population of 2,163. The median age was 43.5 years. 19.9% of residents were under the age of 18 and 17.3% of residents were 65 years of age or older. For every 100 females there were 113.7 males, and for every 100 females age 18 and over there were 114.6 males age 18 and over.

99.1% of residents lived in urban areas, while 0.9% lived in rural areas.

There were 906 households in Meyers, of which 28.7% had children under the age of 18 living in them. Of all households, 55.4% were married-couple households, 20.3% were households with a male householder and no spouse or partner present, and 17.0% were households with a female householder and no spouse or partner present. About 23.8% of all households were made up of individuals and 8.3% had someone living alone who was 65 years of age or older.

There were 1,455 housing units, of which 37.7% were vacant. The homeowner vacancy rate was 1.7% and the rental vacancy rate was 9.7%.

Meyers CDP, California – Racial and ethnic composition Note: the US Census treats Hispanic/Latino as an ethnic category. This table excludes Latinos from the racial categories and assigns them to a separate category. Hispanics/Latinos may be of any race.
Race / Ethnicity (NH = Non-Hispanic)	Pop 2020	% 2020
White alone (NH)	1,742	80.54%
Black or African American alone (NH)	14	0.65%
Native American or Alaska Native alone (NH)	4	0.18%
Asian alone (NH)	29	1.34%
Pacific Islander alone (NH)	0	0.00%
Other race alone (NH)	16	0.74%
Mixed race or Multiracial (NH)	120	5.55%
Hispanic or Latino (any race)	238	11.00%
Total	2,163	100.00%

== Amenities ==
Meyers has one grocery store, Holiday Market, and a hardware store and lumber yard, Meeks. Additional food and beverage establishments include Bob Dog’s Pizza, Divided Sky Bar, and Freel Perk Coffee. Retail and service businesses include Paradise Beauty Supply & Salon, En Vogue Salon, the “Ride Tahoe” rental bike shop, and the bicycle repair and sales shop “Whattabike.” The community also includes a cannabis dispensary, a golf course, Chevron and a 76 gas station, a Mexican restaurant, and a post office. There is also an environmental inspection station, referred to by locals as “The bug station”

The nearest major city center is 5 miles (8 km) to the north along U.S. Highway 50, at an intersection known locally as “The Y” in South Lake Tahoe.

== Climbing ==
Meyers is located 20 minutes from Lovers Leap campground and climbing area. Meyers also has its own local climbing areas, including the Pie Shop on Sawmill Road. Pie Shop houses a bouldering area right off the road, along with a sport and traditional climbing area up a short hike.

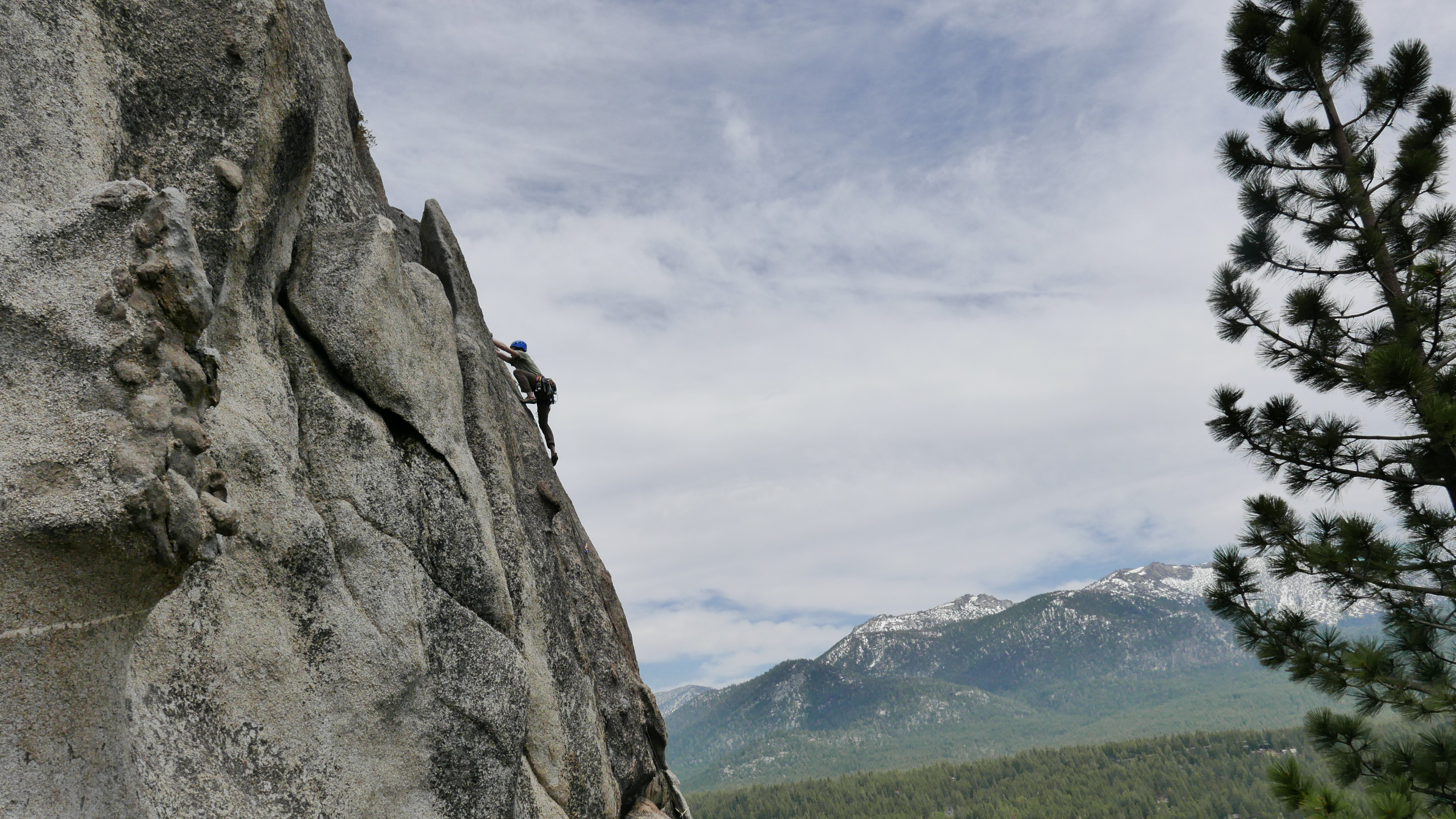
Climbing "Cruise Control" at the Pie Shop

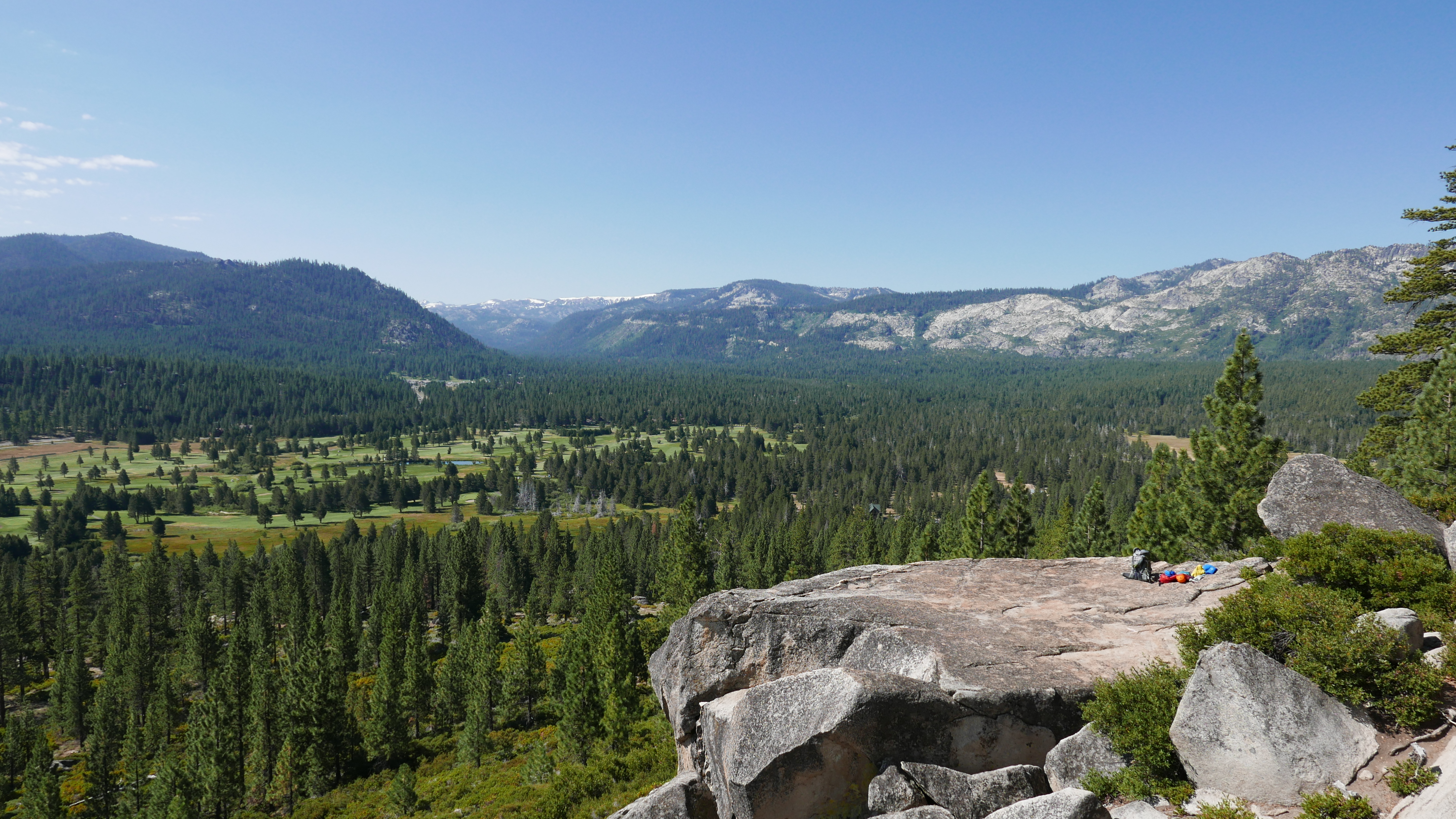
The view from "Lunch Rock" at the Pie Shop

== Education ==
Meyers is home to the Environmental Science Magnet School (formally called “Meyers Elementary”) on San Bernardino Street. It is served by the Lake Tahoe Unified School District.
