= Little Truckee Summit =

- Location within California
- Elevation: 6,411 feet (1,954 m)
- Traversed by: SR 89

Third Approach
- Location: Sierra County, California, United States
- Range: Sierra Nevada
- Coordinates: 39°30′18″N 120°16′55″W
- Topo map: Sierraville

Little Truckee Summit, elevation 6,411 feet (1,954 m), is a mountain pass in Sierra County, California, on the Great Basin Divide between the Middle Fork Feather River to the west and the Little Truckee River to the east. The pass is traversed by State Route 89 northwest of Truckee and southeast of Sierraville.

== See also ==
- Great Basin Divide
