= Luther Pass =

Mountain pass in California, United States

- Location within California
- Elevation: 7,740 ft (2,360 m)
- Traversed by: SR 89

Third Approach
- Location: Alpine / El Dorado counties, California, United States
- Range: Sierra Nevada
- Coordinates: 38°47′13″N 119°56′45″W
- Topo map: USGS Freel Peak

Luther Pass (el. 7,740 ft. / 2,359 m) is a mountain pass in California in the Sierra Nevada, between the Carson River basin to the southeast and Lake Tahoe to the northwest. It is traversed by State Route 89 and lies on the boundary between Alpine County (in the Carson River basin) and El Dorado County (in the Tahoe area). The pass crosses a mountain spur that links the Sierra Crest, the main ridge of the Sierra Nevada to the southwest of the pass, with the Carson Range to the northeast.

The pass is named after Ira M. Luther, one of the "Irish Brigade" described by Mark Twain in Roughing It. In 1854, Luther traversed the pass by covered wagon; he was also involved in later efforts to use the pass as the route for the Central Pacific Railroad. The initial route for the Pony Express across the Sierra Nevada in 1860 connected Placerville and Lake Valley across Luther pass to Woodfords and thence to Nevada, but the route was quickly changed to use the Kingsbury Grade instead.

Nowadays, during the ski season, the pass serves as an important connection between South Lake Tahoe and U.S. Route 50, to the north of the pass, and the Kirkwood ski area to the south. In the summer, Luther Pass forms part of a route from Placerville and Route 50 to U.S. Route 395 and the eastern Sierra, via Monitor Pass, but this route is closed in the winter.
