= California State Route 147 =

Highway in California

State Route 147

- Map of northeastern California with SR 147 highlighted in red

Route information
- Maintained by Caltrans
- Length: 11.681 mi (18.799 km)
- Tourist routes: Volcanic Legacy Scenic Byway

Major junctions
- South end: SR 89 at Canyondam
- North end: SR 36 near Westwood

Location
- Country: United States
- State: California
- Counties: Plumas, Lassen

Highway system
- State highways in California; Interstate; US; State; Scenic; History; Pre‑1964; Unconstructed; Deleted; Freeways
← SR 146	→ SR 149

State Route 147 (SR 147) is a state highway in the U.S. state of California. The route runs along the eastern side of Lake Almanor. It serves as a bypass to connect State Route 89 and State Route 36 on the eastern side of the lake, whereas the two highways already meet on the western side in Chester.

== Route description ==
Route 147 is defined in section 447 of the California Streets and Highways Code, and that the highway is "from Route 89 near Canyon Dam to Route 36 near Westwood".

The route begins at State Route 89 in Canyondam. As it continues through Plumas County, it intersects County Route A13 before exiting the county. It then enters Lassen County where it intersects County Route A21 before meeting its north end at State Route 36.

SR 147 is not part of the National Highway System, a network of highways that are considered essential to the country's economy, defense, and mobility by the Federal Highway Administration.

SR 147 is part of the Volcanic Legacy Scenic Byway, an All-American Road, that circles Lake Almanor.

== Major intersections ==
Except where prefixed with a letter, postmiles were measured on the road as it was in 1964, based on the alignment that existed at the time, and do not necessarily reflect current mileage. Postmile prefixes include: R reflecting a realignment in the route since then, M indicating a second realignment, L referring to an overlap due to a correction or change, and T indicating postmiles classified as temporary. Segments that remain unconstructed or have been relinquished to local control may be omitted. The numbers reset at county lines; the start and end postmiles in each county are given in the county column.

County	Location	Postmile	Destinations	Notes
Plumas; PLU 0.00-9.89	Canyondam	0.00	SR 89	South end of SR 147
Plumas; PLU 0.00-9.89		7.37	CR A13 (Big Springs Road) – Chester	
Lassen; LAS 0.00-1.79		1.14	CR A21 (Mooney Road) – Westwood	
Lassen; LAS 0.00-1.79		1.79	SR 36 – Red Bluff, Susanville	North end of SR 147
1.000 mi = 1.609 km; 1.000 km = 0.621 mi
