= California State Route 44 =

Highway in California

State Route 44
- SR 44 highlighted in red

Route information
- Maintained by Caltrans
- Length: 107.02 mi^{α} (172.23 km)
- Existed: 1935–present
- Tourist routes: Volcanic Legacy Scenic Byway

Major junctions
- West end: SR 273 / SR 299 in Redding
- I-5 in Redding; SR 89 in Lassen Park
- East end: SR 36 near Susanville

Location
- Country: United States
- State: California
- Counties: Shasta, Lassen

Highway system
- State highways in California; Interstate; US; State; Scenic; History; Pre‑1964; Unconstructed; Deleted; Freeways
← SR 43	→ SR 45

State Route 44 (SR 44) is a state highway in the U.S. State of California that travels in an east–west direction from State Routes 273 and 299 in Redding to Lassen Volcanic National Park before ending at State Route 36 west of Susanville. This final portion, between the park and its terminus, is part of the Volcanic Legacy Scenic Byway, a National Scenic Byway.

== Route description ==
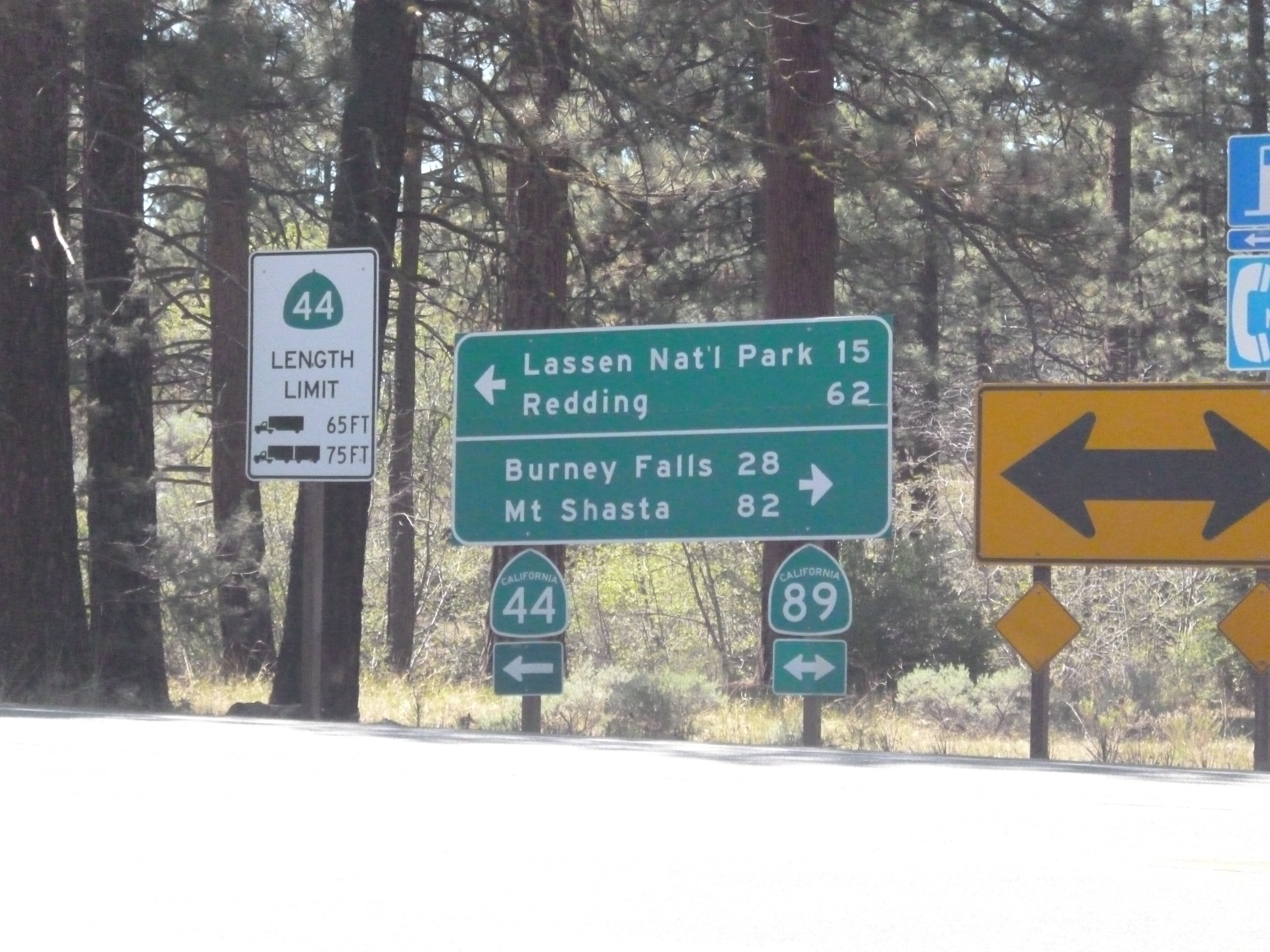
California Route 44 & 89 Intersection

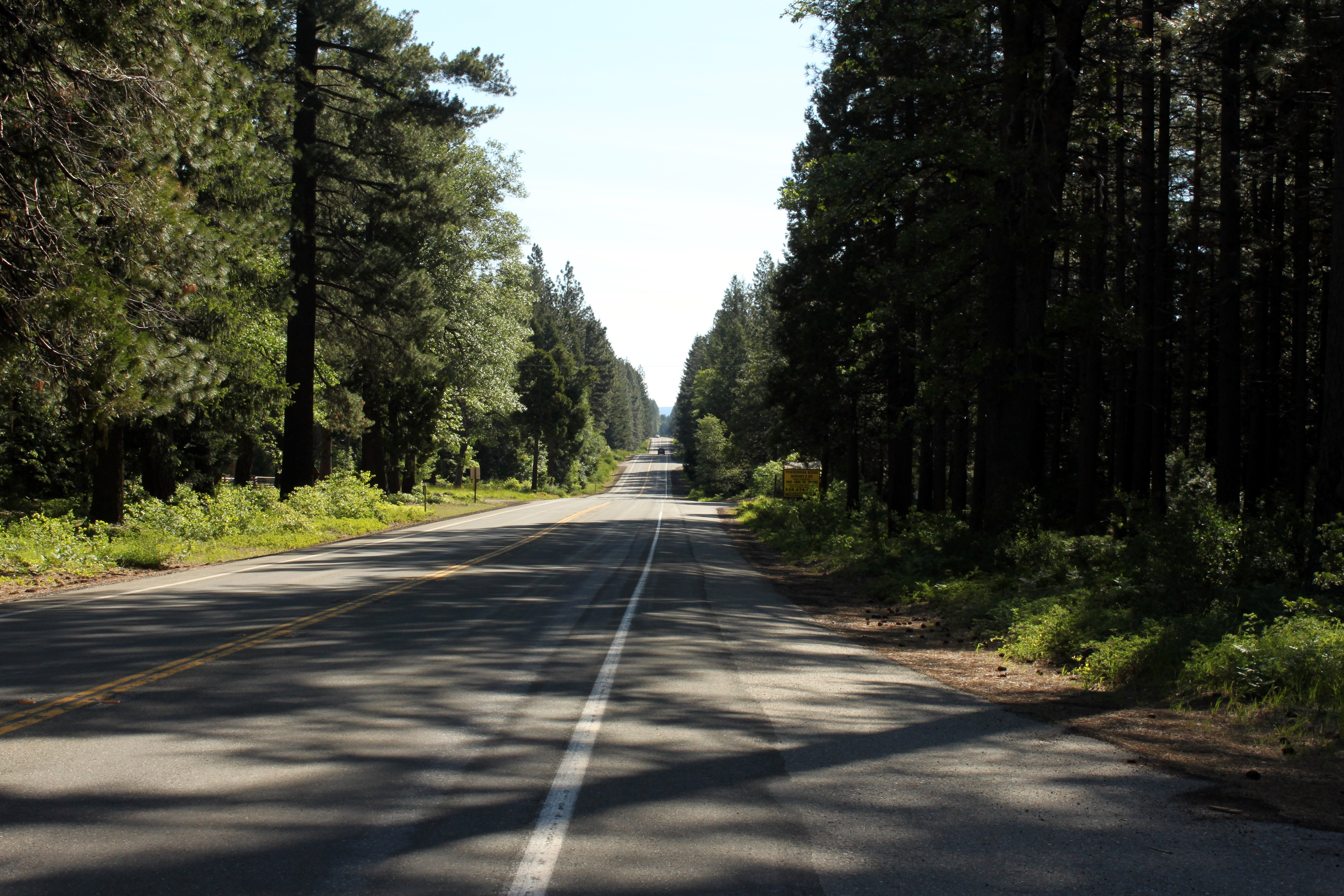
California State Highway 44 near Shingletown, California

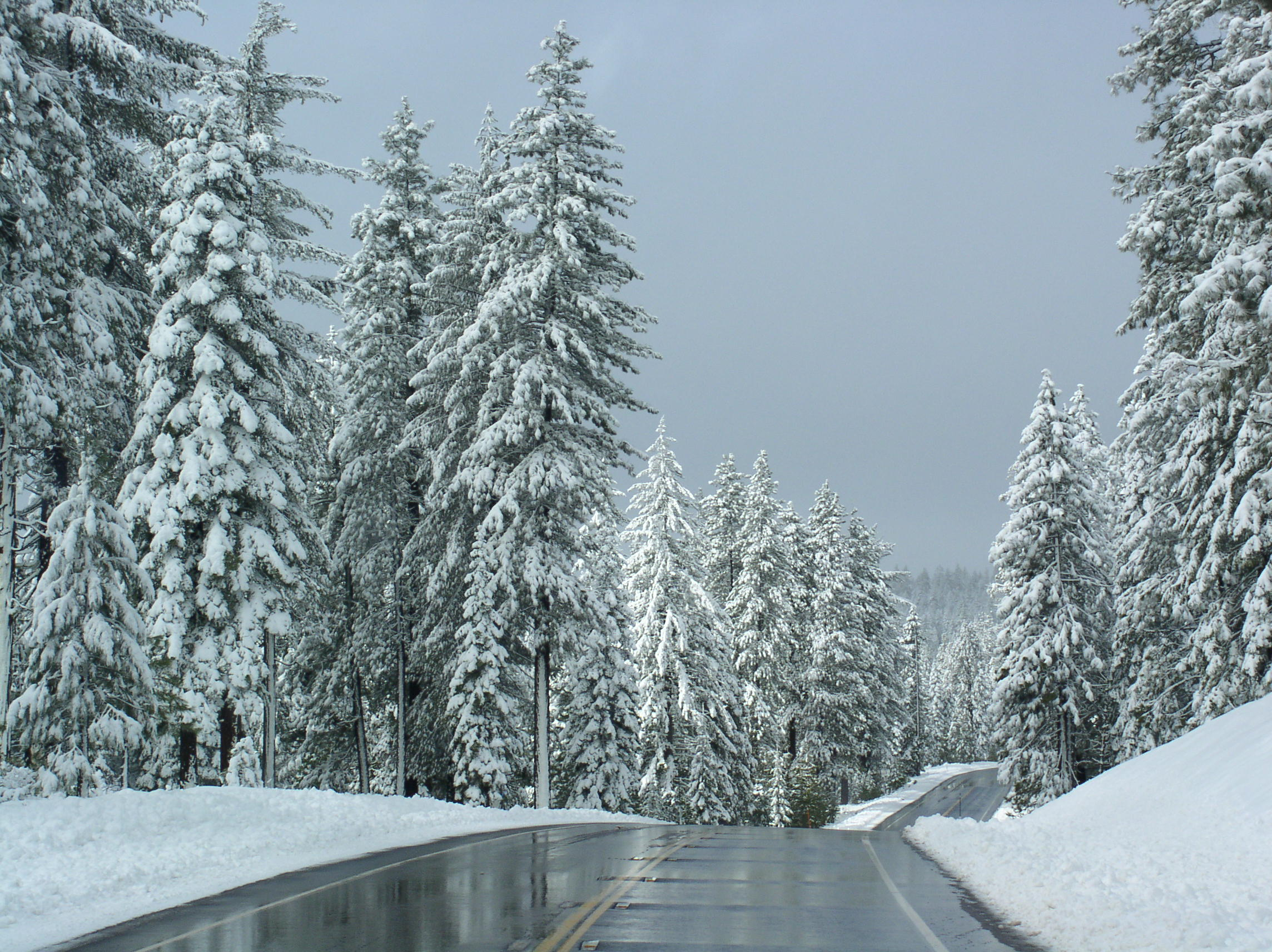
State Route 44 containing a sheet of ice in the winter

Route 44 is defined in section 344 of the California Streets and Highways Code, and that the highway is "from Route 299 at Redding to Route 36 west of Susanville, via the vicinity of Lassen Volcanic National Park".

Route 44 starts in Redding, at the junction of Route 273 (Market Street) and Route 299. This is because in 1998, Route 299's definition was changed. It previously ran on Tehama Street to I-5, but this portion was transferred to Route 44 in 1998 (SR 44 had ended at I-5 at that time). Existing postmile markers do not normally change, so the Route 44/I-5 interchange is still marked as 0.00, and instead the western extension of Route 44 to Route 299 has postmiles with an "L" prefix to signify an overlap due to a correction or change.

After running through one-way pairs through Downtown Redding, SR 44 departs SR 273 onto Tehama Street. After a few blocks, it becomes a freeway as it crosses I-5 and changes back to a two-lane highway at the Redding city limits. Heading eastward, Route 44 passes through a number of small, rural communities (Palo Cedro, Millville, Shingletown, to name a few) before it reaches the north-west entrance to Lassen National Park and the southern Cascades. After this, the only community it passes through is Old Station, which is also the only location for travel services until Susanville.

From the Park entrance, Route 44 joins the Volcanic Legacy Scenic Byway. Route 44 is part of a circular portion of the Scenic Byway, so at the junction with Route 89, the Byway continues along both 89 to the north and on 44 to the east. When Route 44 reaches its terminus at Route 36, the byway heads southwest to continue its circular path.

Between the Route 89 intersection and Route 36 is only one rest area, called Bogard.

SR 44 is part of the California Freeway and Expressway System, and is part of the National Highway System, a network of highways that are considered essential to the country's economy, defense, and mobility by the Federal Highway Administration. SR 44 is eligible to be included in the State Scenic Highway System, but it is not officially designated as a scenic highway by the California Department of Transportation.

== History ==
The former version of SR 44 briefly existed in 1934 before it became U.S. Route 299, now SR 299, one year later when the present-day SR 44 was established in 1935.

== Major intersections ==
Except where prefixed with a letter, postmiles were measured on the road as it was in 1964, based on the alignment that existed at the time, and do not necessarily reflect current mileage. Postmile prefixes include: R reflecting a realignment in the route since then, M indicating a second realignment, L referring to an overlap due to a correction or change, and T indicating postmiles classified as temporary. Segments that remain unconstructed or have been relinquished to local control may be omitted. The numbers reset at county lines; the start and end postmiles in each county are given in the county column.

County	Location	Postmile	Exit	Destinations	Notes
Shasta; SHA L0.00-71.39	Redding	L0.00		SR 273 north / SR 299 east (Market Street north / Historic US 99)	Western terminus of SR 44; west end of SR 273 / Historic US 99 overlap; west end of one-way pair where SR 44 east / SR 273 south traffic heads onto Market Street south and SR 44 west / SR 273 north traffic joins from Eureka Way east
Shasta; SHA L0.00-71.39	Redding	L0.00		SR 299 west (Eureka Way west) – Weaverville, Eureka	Western terminus of SR 44; west end of SR 273 / Historic US 99 overlap; west end of one-way pair where SR 44 east / SR 273 south traffic heads onto Market Street south and SR 44 west / SR 273 north traffic joins from Eureka Way east
Shasta; SHA L0.00-71.39	Redding	L0.16L		SR 273 (Pine Street)	One-way street, inbound access only; SR 44 west traffic joins SR 273 north traffic along Pine Street north
Shasta; SHA L0.00-71.39	Redding	L0.17R		SR 273 south (Tehama Street west / Historic US 99)	East end of SR 273 / Historic US 99 overlap; SR 44 east traffic splits onto Tehama Street east
Shasta; SHA L0.00-71.39	Redding	L0.31L– L0.38R		Liberty Street	At-grade intersection; west end of freeway; no westbound access to Liberty Street south; east end of one-way pair where westbound traffic splits onto Shasta Street and eastbound traffic joins from Tehama Street
Shasta; SHA L0.00-71.39	Redding	L0.85	1	Park Marina Drive / Sundial Bridge Drive	
Shasta; SHA L0.00-71.39	Redding	L1.81 R0.00	2	I-5 – Sacramento, Portland	Signed as exits 2A (south) and 2B (north); I-5 exits 678A-B
Shasta; SHA L0.00-71.39	Redding	R0.13– R0.38	3A	Hilltop Drive / Dana Drive	Signed as exit 2C eastbound; Dana Drive not signed eastbound
Shasta; SHA L0.00-71.39	Redding	R1.24	3B	Victor Avenue	Signed as exit 3 eastbound
Shasta; SHA L0.00-71.39	Redding	R2.13	4	Shasta View Drive	
Shasta; SHA L0.00-71.39	Redding	R3.63	5	Old Oregon Trail / Airport Road	
Shasta; SHA L0.00-71.39	Redding	R3.63	East end of freeway		
Shasta; SHA L0.00-71.39		R4.99		Stillwater Road	Interchange
Shasta; SHA L0.00-71.39	Palo Cedro	R7.00		Deschutes Road	Interchange
Shasta; SHA L0.00-71.39		34.70		Shingletown Rest Area	
Shasta; SHA L0.00-71.39		R49.35		SR 89 south – Lassen Volcanic National Park	West end of SR 89 overlap
Shasta; SHA L0.00-71.39	Old Station	62.69		SR 89 north – Burney Falls, Mount Shasta	East end of SR 89 overlap
Lassen; LAS 0.00-37.25		14.50		Bogard Rest Area	
Lassen; LAS 0.00-37.25		37.25		SR 36 – Susanville, Red Bluff	Eastern terminus of SR 44
1.000 mi = 1.609 km; 1.000 km = 0.621 mi: Concurrency terminus; Incomplete access

== Notes ==
1.^αAssuming Route 44 ends at SR 299, rather than at SR 273
