= Summit Lake (Reading Peak, Shasta County) =

Lake in the state of California, United States

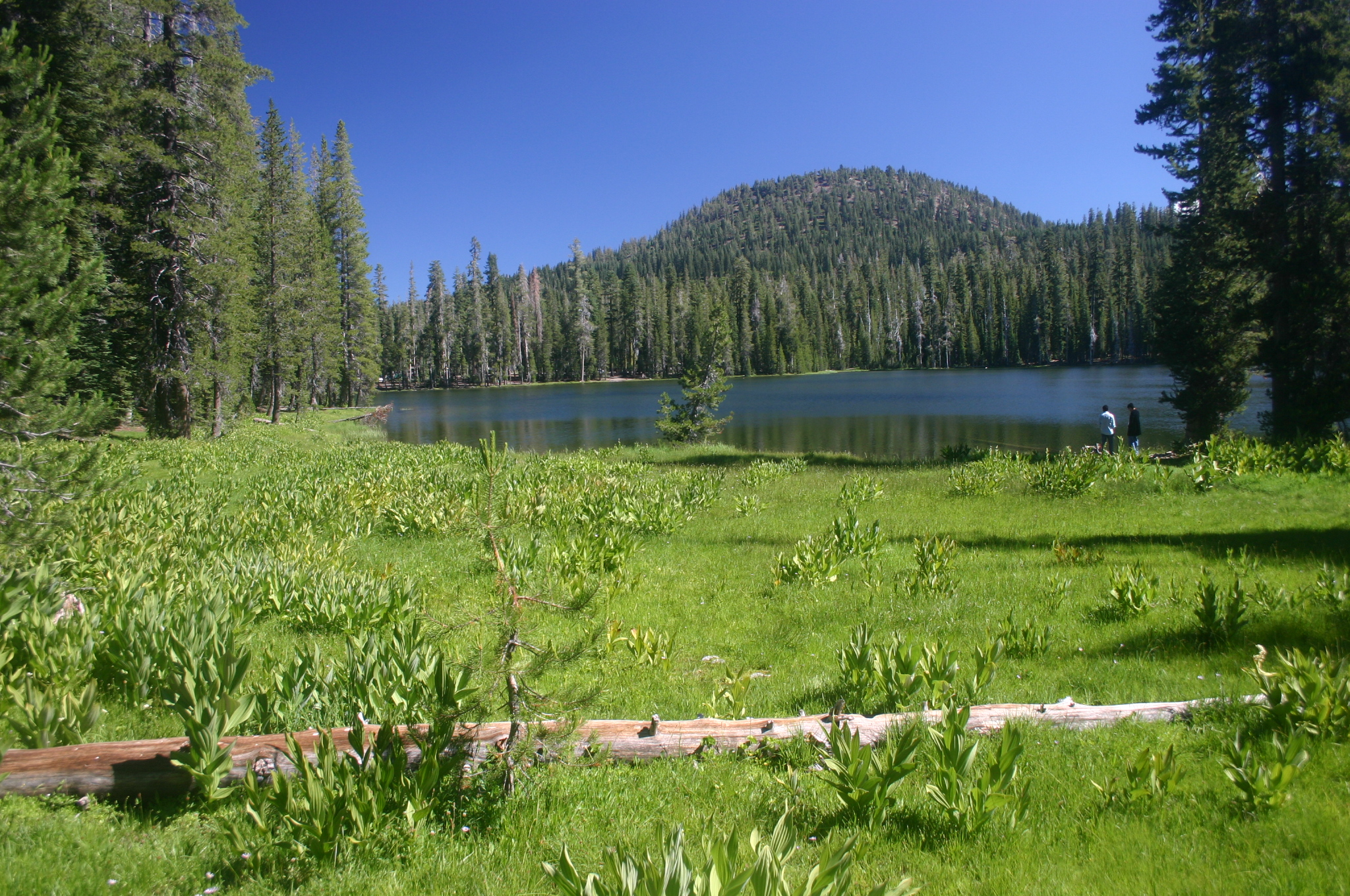

- Location within California Location within the United States
- Location: Lassen Volcanic National Park; Shasta County, California
- Coordinates: 40°29′34″N 121°25′24″W
- Type: Glacial lake
- Primary outflows: Summit Creek
- Basin countries: United States
- Surface elevation: 6,680 ft (2,036 m)
- References: U.S. Geological Survey Geographic Names Information System: Summit Lake

Summit Lake is a lake in the Lassen Volcanic National Park of Shasta County, California, east of California Route 89 at elevation 6,700 ft (2,000 m). Two campgrounds, named Summit Lake North and Summit Lake South, are located adjacent to the lake.

== See also ==
- List of lakes in California
