= California State Route 36 =

Highway in California

State Route 36
- SR 36 highlighted in red

Route information
- Maintained by Caltrans
- Length: 248.856 mi (400.495 km)
- Existed: 1934–present
- Tourist routes: Volcanic Legacy Scenic Byway

Major junctions
- West end: US 101 near Fortuna
- I-5 in Red Bluff; SR 99 east of Red Bluff; SR 89 from near Mineral to near Chester
- East end: US 395 near Johnstonville

Location
- Country: United States
- State: California
- Counties: Humboldt, Trinity, Shasta, Tehama, Plumas, Lassen

Highway system
- State highways in California; Interstate; US; State; Scenic; History; Pre‑1964; Unconstructed; Deleted; Freeways
← SR 35	→ SR 37

State Route 36 (SR 36) is an east–west state highway in the U.S. state of California that is routed from U.S. Route 101 in Humboldt County to U.S. Route 395 just east of Susanville in Lassen County. The highway passes through Red Bluff, the county seat of Tehama County, on the northern edge of the Sacramento Valley. The portion of SR 36 travelling past Lassen Volcanic National Park and Lake Almanor is part of the Volcanic Legacy Scenic Byway, a National Scenic Byway. Also, Route 36 between Alton and Susanville is a designated Blue Star Memorial Highway.

== Route description ==
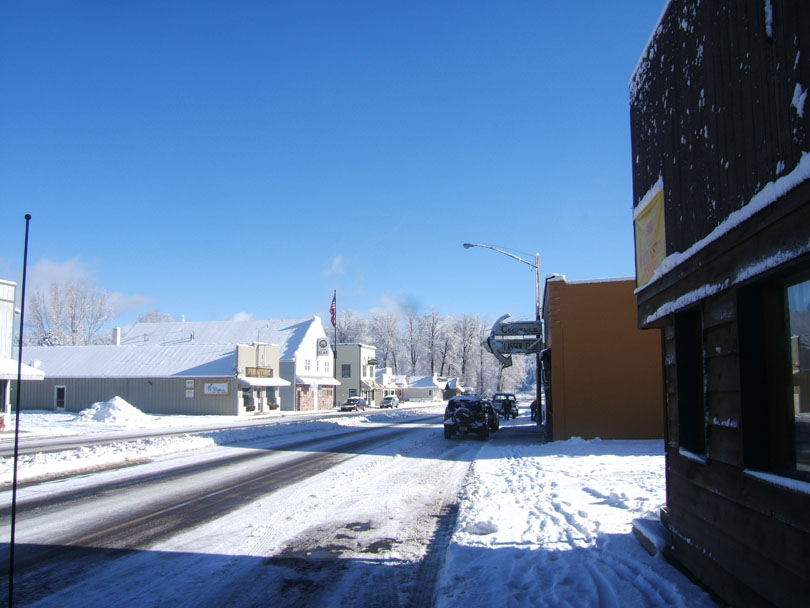
SR 36 through Chester, Plumas County

Route 36 is defined in section 336 of the California Streets and Highways Code, and that the highway is from "Route 101 near Alton to Route 395 near Johnsonville [sic] passing near Forest Glen via Red Bluff and Mineral, via the vicinity of Morgan Summit, and via Susanville".

SR 36 begins in Alton at an interchange with U.S. Route 101. It continues east through the communities of Hydesville and Carlotta before paralleling the Van Duzen River all the way to the town of Bridgeville. It passes near Mt. McClellan as it follows a curving path through the communities of Dinsmore and Cobbs, then enters Trinity National Forest.

Once in Trinity County, the highway veers away from the Van Duzen River, and crosses the Mad River before passing through the communities of Mad River and Forest Glen. The route briefly bends north to intersect with the southern terminus of SR 3 before turning east again and entering first Shasta County, where SR 36 passes through Wildwood and Platina, where it intersects CR A16 and leaves the forest, and enters Tehama County. SR 36 passes through Rosewood and later intersects CR A5 before entering the city of Red Bluff as Beegum Road. SR 36 continues south as Main Street into downtown Red Bluff before making a turn east as Oak Street, crossing the Sacramento River and coming to an interchange with I-5 before turning into Antelope Boulevard and passing the Tehama County Fairgrounds as it leaves the city limits.

SR 36 intersects the northern terminus of SR 99 and turns northeast at the intersection. Several miles later, SR 36 intersects CR A6 at the community of Dales before continuing east and passing through Paynes Creek. Eventually, SR 36 intersects SR 172 at the town of Mineral in the Lassen National Forest before running concurrently with SR 89. SR 89 and SR 36 intersect with the eastern terminus of SR 32 before crossing into Plumas County. Once the highway reaches the western shore of Lake Almanor, SR 89 continues southeast, while SR 36 passes through the community of Chester along the northern shore of Lake Almanor.

The route continues into Lassen County, where it intersects SR 147 and passes in between Lassen and Plumas National Forests. SR 36 intersects SR 44 before entering the city of Susanville as Hillcrest Road. The highway continues north briefly as Pine Street before becoming Main Street and continuing east through downtown Susanville and intersecting SR 139 and CR A27 before leaving the city limits. SR 36 ends at an intersection with U.S. Route 395 just southwest of Johnstonville.

SR 36 is part of the California Freeway and Expressway System, and east of SR 44 is part of the National Highway System, a network of highways that are considered essential to the country's economy, defense, and mobility by the Federal Highway Administration. SR 36 is eligible for the State Scenic Highway System, but it is not officially designated as a scenic highway by the California Department of Transportation. Both the SR 36/SR 86 concurrency, and the segment of SR 36 between SR 86 near Chester and SR 44 near Susanville, are part of the Volcanic Legacy Scenic Byway, a National Scenic Byway.

== In popular culture ==
On the TV show Lost, during a flashback scene in the episode "Further Instructions," John Locke picks up a hitchhiker who happens to be an undercover police officer on State Route 36.

In author Robyn Carr's romantic novel series Virgin River, the fictional town of Virgin River is located off State Route 36 in the mountains of Humboldt County in Northern California.

In the New Zealand TV series 800 Words, a California 36 highway sign hangs on the wall of Big Mac's fight club (alongside one for Interstate 20).

== Major intersections ==
Except where prefixed with a letter, postmiles were measured on the road as it was in 1964, based on the alignment that existed at the time, and do not necessarily reflect current mileage. Postmile prefixes include: R reflecting a realignment in the route since then, M indicating a second realignment, L referring to an overlap due to a correction or change, and T indicating postmiles classified as temporary. Segments that remain unconstructed or have been relinquished to local control may be omitted. The numbers reset at county lines; the start and end postmiles in each county are given in the county column.

County	Location	Postmile	Destinations	Notes
Humboldt; HUM 0.00-45.68	Alton	0.00	US 101	Interchange; western terminus of SR 36; US 101 exit 685; road continues as Fowler Lane
Trinity; TRI 0.00-R41.14		27.23	SR 3 north – Hayfork, Redding	Southern terminus of SR 3
Shasta–Tehama county line		11.93 0.00	Beegum Creek	
Tehama; TEH 0.00-104.00	Red Bluff	L39.73	I-5 BL north (Historic US 99 north) – Redding	West end of I-5 BL / Hist. US 99 overlap; former US 99 north
Tehama; TEH 0.00-104.00	Red Bluff	L41.29	I-5 BL south / Historic US 99 (Main Street south) / Oak Street	East end of I-5 BL / Hist. US 99 overlap; former US 99W south
Tehama; TEH 0.00-104.00	Red Bluff	41.85	I-5 – Redding, Sacramento	Interchange; I-5 exit 649
Tehama; TEH 0.00-104.00		44.00	SR 99 south – Chico	Northern terminus of SR 99; former US 99E south
Tehama; TEH 0.00-104.00	Mineral	83.14	SR 172 east – Mill Creek	Western terminus of SR 172; through traffic to Mill Creek closed in winter
Tehama; TEH 0.00-104.00		87.68	SR 89 north – Lassen Volcanic National Park	West end of SR 89 overlap
Tehama; TEH 0.00-104.00	Morgan Springs	91.25	SR 172 west – Mill Creek	Eastern terminus of SR 172
Tehama; TEH 0.00-104.00		99.94	SR 32 west – Chico	Eastern terminus of SR 32
Plumas; PLU 0.00-18.42	Chester	6.29	SR 89 south – Greenville, Quincy	East end of SR 89 overlap
Plumas; PLU 0.00-18.42		R12.80	Lake Almanor Rest Area	
Lassen; LAS 0.00-R29.39		0.76	SR 147 south – Clear Creek, Greenville, Oroville	Northern terminus of SR 147
Lassen; LAS 0.00-R29.39		11.78	Fredonyer Pass, elevation 5,748 feet (1,752 m)	
Lassen; LAS 0.00-R29.39		R19.20	SR 44 west – Redding, Mount Shasta	Eastern terminus of SR 44
Lassen; LAS 0.00-R29.39	Susanville	25.36	SR 139 north (Ash Street) – Adin, Klamath Falls, Susanville Indian Rancheria, Lassen College	Southern terminus of SR 139
Lassen; LAS 0.00-R29.39		R29.39	US 395 – Reno, State Prison, Alturas, Klamath Falls	Eastern terminus of SR 36; highway continues as US 395 south
1.000 mi = 1.609 km; 1.000 km = 0.621 mi: Concurrency terminus

== See also ==
- Humboldt Wagon Road
