= California State Route 273 =

State highway in Shasta County, California, United States

State Route 273
- SR 273 highlighted in red

Route information
- Maintained by Caltrans
- Length: 16.23 mi (26.12 km)

Major junctions
- South end: I-5 in Anderson
- North end: I-5 in Redding

Location
- Country: United States
- State: California
- Counties: Shasta

Highway system
- State highways in California; Interstate; US; State; Scenic; History; Pre‑1964; Unconstructed; Deleted; Freeways
← SR 271	→ SR 274

State Route 273 (SR 273) is a state highway in the U.S. state of California that serves as a business loop of Interstate 5 that travels directly through the downtown districts of Anderson and Redding in Shasta County. SR 273 runs along former U.S. Route 99, and Historic US 99 markers may be found along the route.

== Route description ==
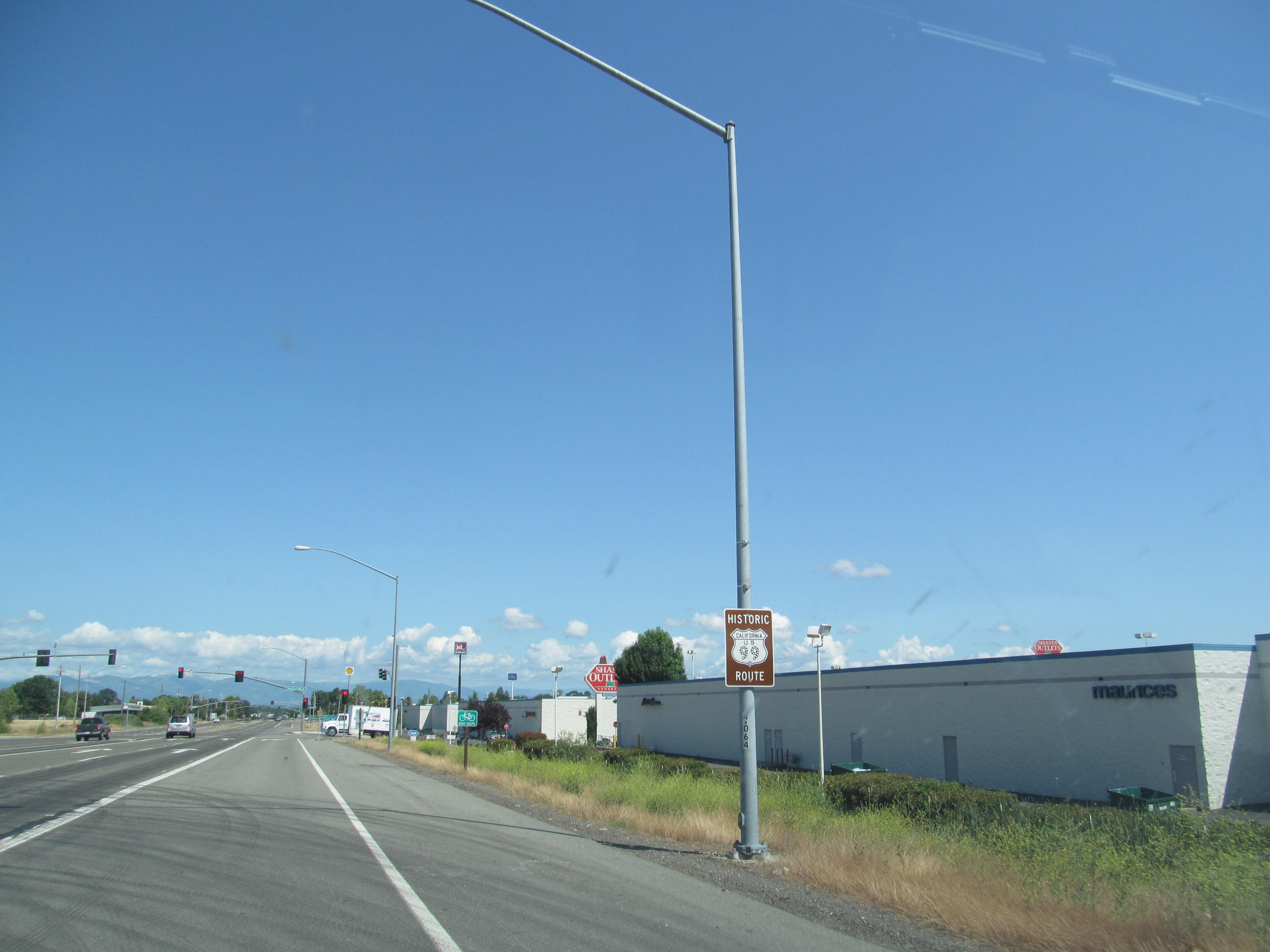
Historic U.S. Route 99 sign along SR 273

Route 273 is defined in section 573 of the California Streets and Highways Code. The definition omits the concurrency with Route 299 instead of duplicating that segment in the other route's definition in the code:

Route 273 is from:
(a) Route 5 near Anderson to Route 299 in Redding.
(b) From Route 299 in Redding to Route 5 northeast of Redding.

SR 273 begins just south of Anderson at an interchange with Interstate 5. The roadway then parallels I-5 northeast into central Anderson. Upon exiting a suburban area, the route enters farmland, while paralleling the Sacramento River. The roadway then enters suburban Redding, where it turns away from the Sacramento River and zigzags along local roads through downtown, where it joins State Route 299. SR 273 and 299 then exit downtown as a concurrency and cross the Sacramento River. SR 299 then splits to the east, while SR 273 heads north to meet its northern terminus at I-5 in the suburbs of Redding.

SR 273 is part of the National Highway System, a network of highways that are considered essential to the country's economy, defense, and mobility by the Federal Highway Administration.

== Major intersections ==
Except where prefixed with a letter, postmiles were measured on the road as it was in 1964, based on the alignment of U.S. Route 99 as it existed at that time, and do not necessarily reflect current mileage. Postmile prefixes include: R reflecting a realignment in the route since then, M indicating a second realignment, L referring to an overlap due to a correction or change, and T indicating postmiles classified as temporary. Segments that remain unconstructed or have been relinquished to local control may be omitted. The entire route is in Shasta County.

Location	Postmile	Destinations	Notes
Anderson	3.82	I-5 south – Sacramento	Interchange; I-5 north exit 667A; former US 99 south; no direct access to I-5 north
Anderson	4.29	Factory Outlets Drive to I-5 north / Deschutes Road – Redding, Coleman Fish Hatchery	
Redding	14.47	Buenaventura Boulevard to SR 299 west – Weaverville, Eureka	Serves Dignity Health – Mercy Medical Center Redding (northbound only); to SR 299 west not signed southbound
Redding	15.98	Cypress Avenue to I-5	South end of one-way pair where southbound traffic stays on Market Street and northbound traffic diverts to Pine Street and then Eureka Way; former SR 44 east
Redding	R16.32R–R16.40L	South Street	Serves Dignity Health – Mercy Medical Center Redding (southbound only)
Redding	R16.48R–R16.51L	CR A16 (Placer Street)	Eastern terminus of CR A16
Redding	R16.66R– R16.80L	SR 44 east (Tehama Street) to I-5	One-way street; south end of SR 44 overlap; former US 299 east; serves Shasta Regional Medical Center (northbound access is via Butte Street)
Redding	R16.73R	Shasta Street (SR 44)	One-way street, inbound access only where SR 44 west traffic joins SR 273 north
Redding	16.83	SR 44 east / SR 273 south (Market Street south)	North end of one-way pair where southbound traffic stays on Market Street and northbound traffic joins from Eureka Way east; north end of SR 44 overlap; western terminus of SR 44; south end of SR 299 overlap; former US 299 west
Redding	16.83	SR 299 west (Eureka Way west) – Weaverville, Eureka	North end of one-way pair where southbound traffic stays on Market Street and northbound traffic joins from Eureka Way east; north end of SR 44 overlap; western terminus of SR 44; south end of SR 299 overlap; former US 299 west
Redding	18.62	SR 299 east (Lake Boulevard east) to I-5 south	North end of SR 299 overlap
Redding	18.62	Lake Boulevard west (CR A18)	Eastern terminus of CR A18
Redding	20.03	I-5 north – Portland	Interchange; I-5 south exit 681B; former US 99 north; no direct access to I-5 south
1.000 mi = 1.609 km; 1.000 km = 0.621 mi: Concurrency terminus; Incomplete access
