= Emerald Lake (Lassen Peak) =

Lake in California, United States

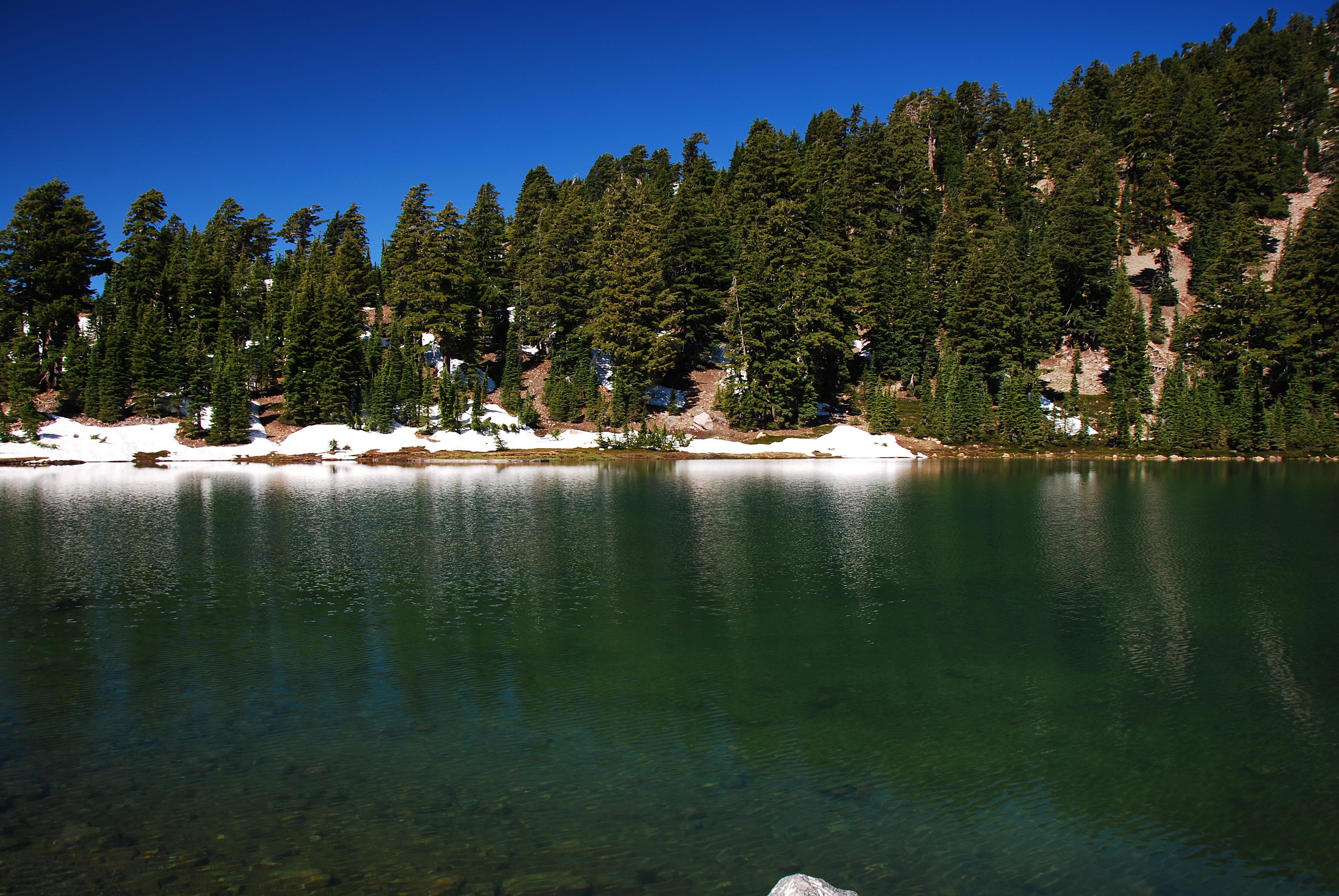
- Emerald Lake near Lassen Peak in Lassen Volcanic National Park

- Location within California Location within the United States
- Location: Lassen Volcanic National Park, Shasta County, California, US
- Coordinates: 40°28′04″N 121°31′07″W
- Basin countries: United States
- Surface elevation: 8,100 ft (2,470 m)

Emerald Lake is a small lake located nearby Lassen Peak in Lassen Volcanic National Park, in Shasta County, California.

The lake is located about 0.3 mi (0.5 km) west of Lake Helen. Highway 89 runs along the eastern shore of the small lake.

== See also ==
- List of lakes in California
