= Chambers Lodge, California =

Unincorporated community in California, United States

Chambers Lodge
- Unincorporated community
- Location in California Chambers Lodge (the United States)
- Coordinates: 39°04′24″N 120°08′29″W
- Country: United States
- State: California
- County: Placer County
- Elevation: 6,237 ft (1,901 m)

Chambers Lodge (also, McKinney) was a historical lodge and post office in Placer County, California. Chambers Lodge was located on Lake Tahoe, 1.25 miles (2.0 km) southeast of Homewood, at an elevation of 6237 feet (1901 m). It was one of the oldest recreational lodges on Lake Tahoe, first established in 1854. After a succession of ownership changes, the lodge was ultimately demolished in 1970, and the site is now occupied by vacation homes.

The McKinney post office opened in 1884, changed the name to Chambers Lodge in 1928, and closed for good in 1959. The name McKinney honored John McKinney who settled there in 1864. The name Chambers Lodge honored David H. Chambers who built a lodge at the site in 1928.
