= Morgan Summit =

- Location within California
- Elevation: 5,768 feet (1,758 m)
- Traversed by: SR 89, SR 36

Third Approach
- Location: Tehama County, California, U.S.
- Range: Southern Cascades / Northern Sierra Nevada
- Coordinates: 40°21′44″N 121°31′51″W
- Topo map: USGS Mineral

Morgan Summit is a mountain pass on a road shared by Highway 89 and Highway 36 in Tehama County, California. The pass is located in between the town of Mineral and Childs Meadow south of Lassen Peak and Lassen Volcanic National Park. The stated elevation of the pass varies between 5,753 ft (1,754 m) and 5,768 ft (1,758 m). The pass is high enough to receive snowfall during the winter.
