= Monitor Pass =

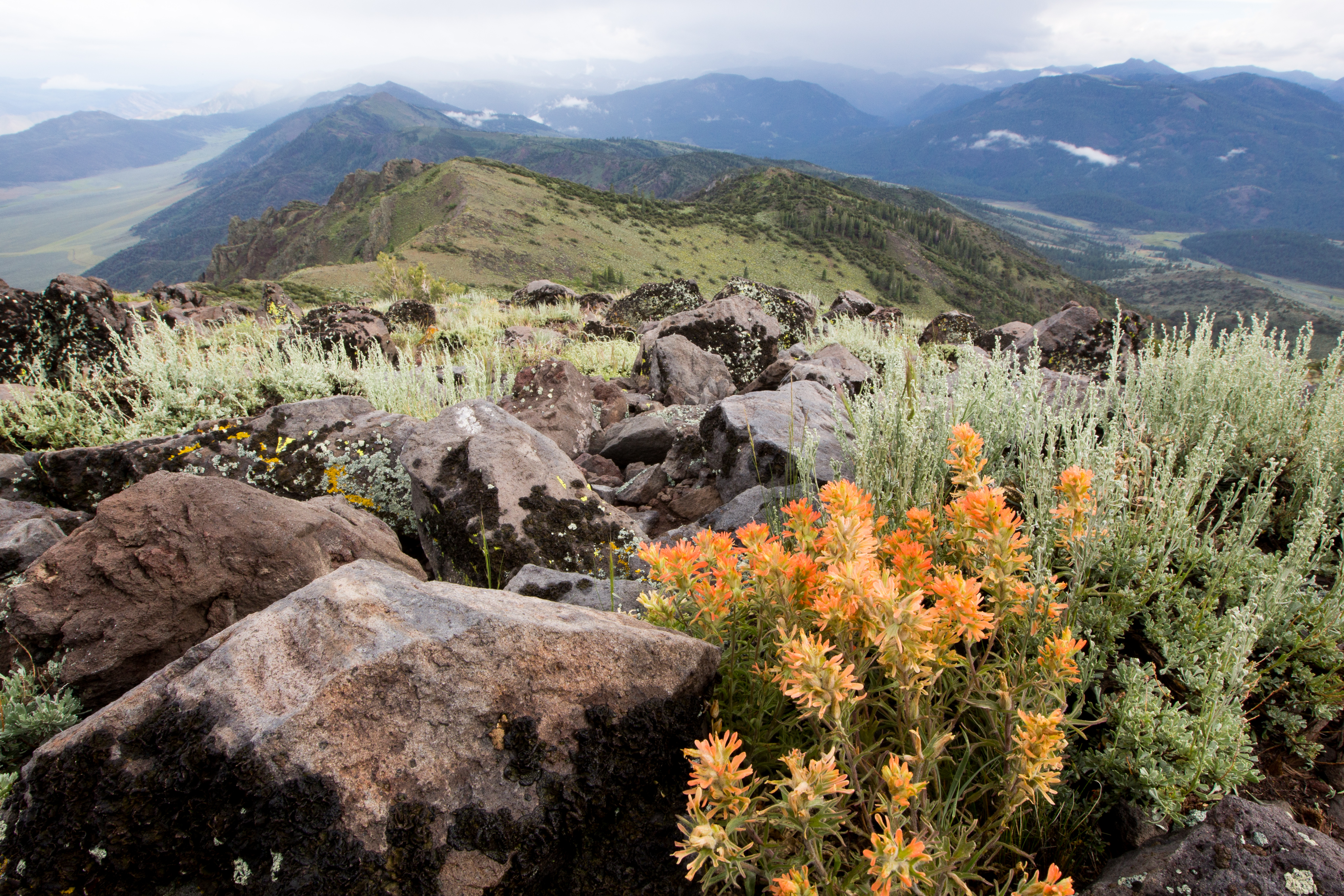
- The view from a 9,000 foot peak, just south of Monitor Pass

- Location within California
- Elevation: 8,314 feet (2,534 m)
- Traversed by: SR 89

Third Approach
- Location: Alpine County, California, United States
- Range: Sierra Nevada
- Coordinates: 38°40′32.05″N 119°37′16.5″W

Monitor Pass (el. 8,314 ft / 2,534 m) is a high mountain pass in California in the Sierra Nevada southeast of Lake Tahoe. It is traversed by State Route 89 near that highway's southern terminus at U.S. Route 395 near the community of Topaz. While this section of Route 89 serves to connect the basins of the West Walker River and Carson River, Monitor Pass itself lies on a side ridge between tributaries of the East Fork Carson River. Crossing the pass allows for a more direct route between U.S. 395 and Markleeville, California, at the expense of some additional elevation.

Monitor Pass is part of the route taken by Jedediah Smith in late spring of 1827 when leaving California at the end of his first exploratory journey, the first crossing ever of the Sierra Nevada by a non-native. Smith first came down from Ebbetts Pass, then continued from Monitor Pass past Topaz Lake into Nevada.

The highway through the pass was completed in the early 1950s, making it one of the most recent Sierra Nevada passes to be opened by a paved road. The highway project was promoted by Robert M. Jackson of Markleeville, who worked for the Alpine County Public Works Department for more than 30 years.

State Route 89 over Monitor Pass is subject to winter closure due to snow accumulation. Dates of closure vary depending on the weather, but Monitor Pass is generally closed to vehicular traffic between late November and early April.
