= Feather River Inn, California =

Feather River Inn
- Unincorporated community
- Location in California Feather River Inn (the United States)
- Coordinates: 39°47′26″N 120°37′47″W
- Country: United States
- State: California
- County: Plumas
- Elevation: 4,460 ft (1,360 m)

Feather River Inn is a historic Alpine-style Lodge in Plumas County, California, United States. It lies at an elevation of 4462 feet (1360 m). Feather River Inn is located on state routes 70 and 89. It is located 1 mile (1.6 km) northwest of Blairsden.

According to the Stockton Record, the Inn was sold by the University of the Pacific in 2004.
