= Indian Falls, California =

Indian Falls
- Unincorporated Community; Census Designated Place
- Location in Plumas County and the state of California

- Location in the United States
- Coordinates: 40°3′3″N 120°58′48″W
- Country: United States
- State: California
- County: Plumas

Area
  - Total: 1.842 sq mi (4.770 km^{2})
  - Land: 1.842 sq mi (4.770 km^{2})
  - Water: 0 sq mi (0 km^{2}) 0%
- Elevation: 3,258 ft (993 m)

Population (2020)
  - Total: 79
  - Density: 43/sq mi (17/km^{2})
- Time zone: UTC-8 (Pacific (PST))
  - Summer (DST): UTC-7 (PDT)
- ZIP code: 95952
- Area code: 530
- FIPS code: 06-36364
- GNIS feature ID: 1656088

Indian Falls is a census-designated place (CDP) in Plumas County, California, United States. The population was 79 at the 2020 census, up from 54 at the 2010 census.

== Geography ==
Indian Falls is located at 40°3′3″N 120°58′48″W (40.050816, -120.979897).

According to the United States Census Bureau, the CDP has a total area of 1.8 square miles (4.7 km^{2}), all land.

It was named after a set of waterfalls on Indian Creek.

Much of the town was destroyed from the Dixie Fire of July 13, 2021.

== Demographics ==
Historical population
Census	Pop.	Note	%±
2000	37		—
2010	54		45.9%
2020	79		46.3%
U.S. Decennial Census; 1860–1870 1880-1890; 1900 1910 1920; 1930 1940 1950; 1960 1970 1980; 1990 2000 2010

Indian Falls first appeared as a census designated place in the 2000 U.S. census.

=== 2020 ===
Indian Falls CDP, California – Racial and ethnic composition Note: the US Census treats Hispanic/Latino as an ethnic category. This table excludes Latinos from the racial categories and assigns them to a separate category. Hispanics/Latinos may be of any race.
Race / Ethnicity (NH = Non-Hispanic)	Pop 2000	Pop 2010	Pop 2020	% 2000	% 2010	% 2020
White alone (NH)	36	47	70	97.30%	87.04%	88.61%
Black or African American alone (NH)	0	0	0	0.00%	0.00%	0.00%
Native American or Alaska Native alone (NH)	0	0	0	0.00%	0.00%	0.00%
Asian alone (NH)	1	1	0	2.70%	1.85%	0.00%
Native Hawaiian or Pacific Islander alone (NH)	0	0	0	0.00%	0.00%	0.00%
Other race alone (NH)	0	0	0	0.00%	0.00%	0.00%
Mixed race or Multiracial (NH)	0	2	5	0.00%	3.70%	6.33%
Hispanic or Latino (any race)	0	4	4	0.00%	7.41%	5.06%
Total	37	54	79	100.00%	100.00%	100.00%

The 2020 United States census reported that Indian Falls had a population of 79. The population density was 42.9 inhabitants per square mile (16.6/km^{2}). The racial makeup of Indian Falls was 70 (89%) White, 0 (0%) African American, 0 (0.0%) Native American, 0 (0%) Asian, 0 (0%) Pacific Islander, 1 (1%) from other races, and 8 (10%) from two or more races. Hispanic or Latino of any race were 4 persons (5%).

The whole population lived in households. There were 28 households, out of which 9 (32%) had children under the age of 18 living in them, 5 (18%) were married-couple households, 5 (18%) were cohabiting couple households, 8 (29%) had a female householder with no partner present, and 10 (36%) had a male householder with no partner present. 11 households (39%) were one person, and 3 (11%) were one person aged 65 or older. The average household size was 2.82. There were 15 families (54% of all households).

The age distribution was 29 people (37%) under the age of 18, 0 people (0%) aged 18 to 24, 7 people (9%) aged 25 to 44, 27 people (34%) aged 45 to 64, and 16 people (20%) who were 65 years of age or older. The median age was 51.5 years. There were 55 males and 24 females.

There were 34 housing units at an average density of 18.5 units per square mile (7.1 units/km^{2}), of which 28 (82%) were occupied. Of these, 24 (86%) were owner-occupied, and 4 (14%) were occupied by renters.

== Politics ==
In the state legislature, Indian Falls is in the 1st senatorial district, represented by Republican Megan Dahle, and the 1st Assembly district, represented by Republican Heather Hadwick.

Federally, Indian Falls is in California's 3rd congressional district, represented by Independent Kevin Kiley.

== Education ==
The school district is Plumas Unified School District.
