= Camp Richardson, California =

Unincorporated community in California, United States

Camp Richardson
- Unincorporated community
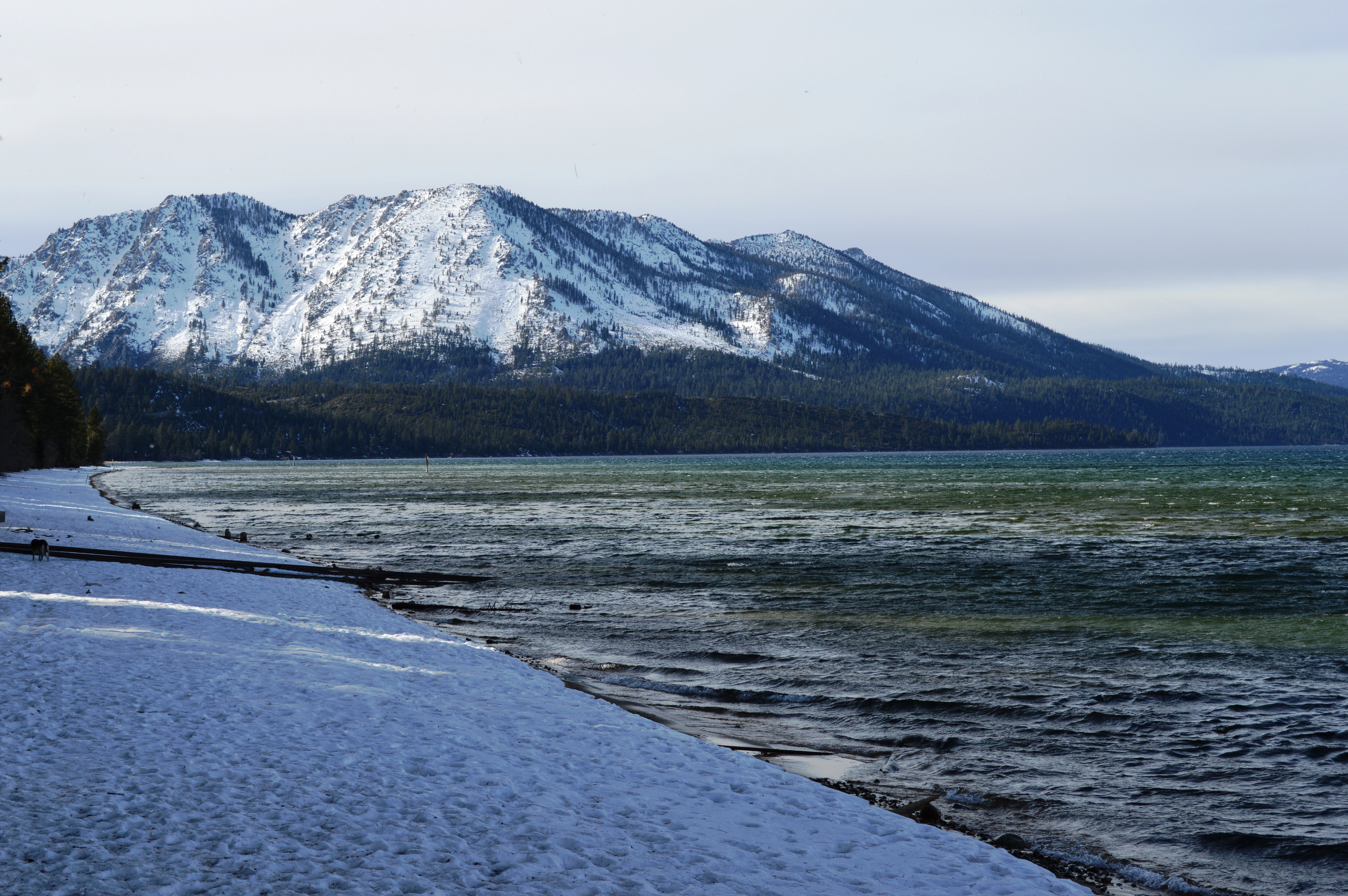
- Beach at Camp Richardson

- Location in California Camp Richardson (the United States)
- Coordinates: 38°56′04″N 120°02′25″W
- Country: United States
- State: California
- County: El Dorado
- Elevation: 6,250 ft (1,905 m)

Population
  - Total: 75

Camp Richardson is an unincorporated resort community at Lake Tahoe, in El Dorado County, California, United States. It lies at an elevation of 6250 feet (1905 m) in the Sierra Nevada. A vacation community, Camp Richardson has a marina, cabins, hotel rooms, and a bar and grill. The camp was established by Captain Alonzo Richardson in 1921.

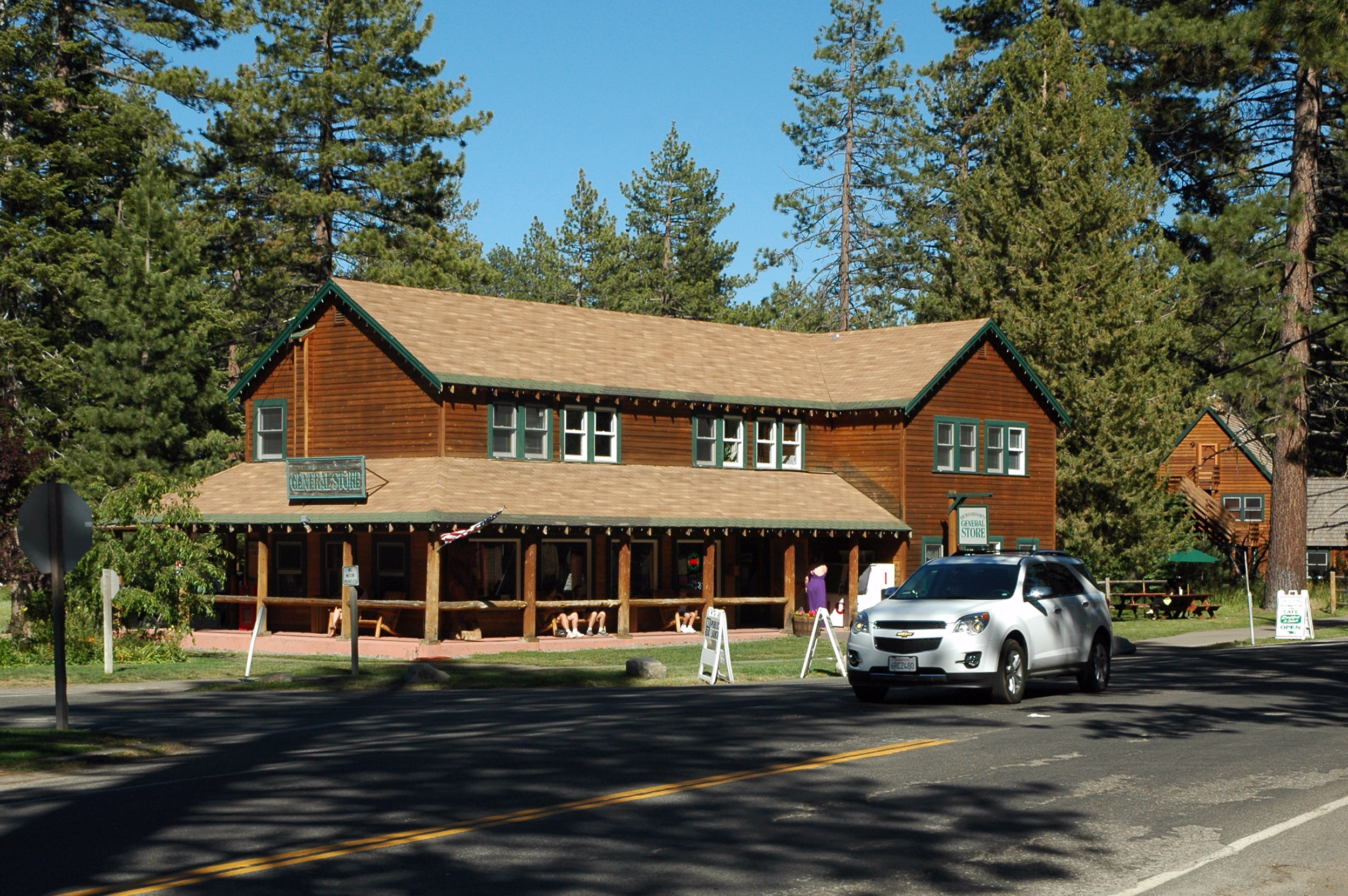
Camp Richardson general store

A post office operated at Camp Richardson from 1927 to 1973, with a closure during 1964 and 1965. The place is named after its first postmaster, Alonzo L. Richardson. A USGS topographic map from 1891 shows Camp Richardson used to be called Yanks.
