= Old Station, California =

Old Station
- census-designated place
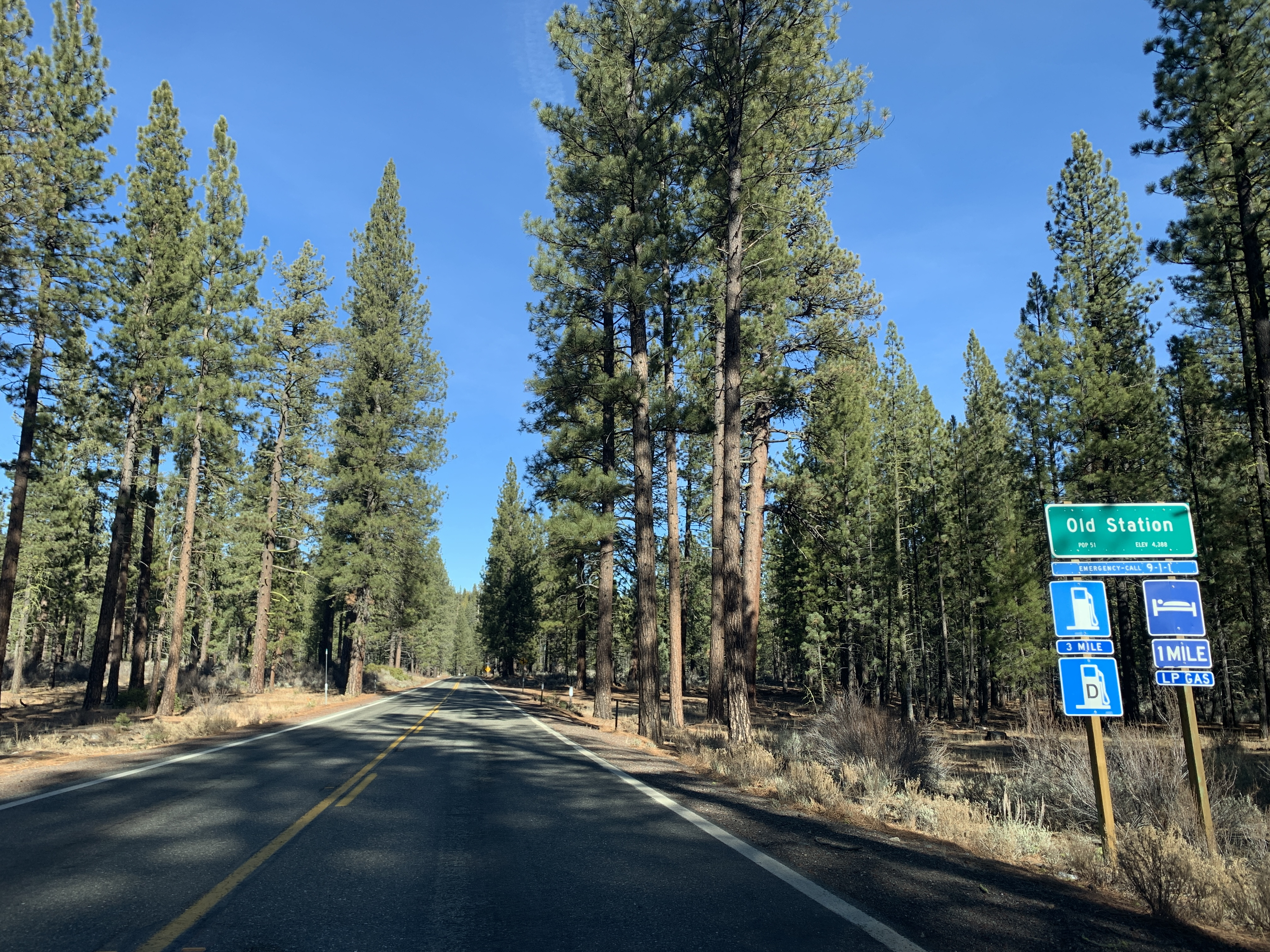

- Position in California.
- Coordinates: 40°40′21″N 121°25′21″W
- Country: United States
- State: California
- County: Shasta

Area
  - Total: 2.221 sq mi (5.753 km^{2})
  - Land: 2.220 sq mi (5.749 km^{2})
  - Water: 0.0012 sq mi (0.003 km^{2}) 0.06%
- Elevation: 4,386 ft (1,337 m)

Population (2020)
  - Total: 64
  - Density: 29/sq mi (11/km^{2})
- Time zone: UTC-8 (Pacific (PST))
  - Summer (DST): UTC-7 (PDT)
- ZIP Code: 96071
- Area code: 530
- GNIS feature ID: 2628770

Old Station is a census-designated place (CDP) in Shasta County, California, United States. It is located 13 miles (21 km) north of Lassen Volcanic National Park, directly between Redding and Susanville. The ZIP code in Old Station is 96071 and the area code 530. Old Station sits at an elevation of 4,386 feet (1,337 m). Its population is 64 as of the 2020 census, up from 51 from the 2010 census.

In 2021, the town was threatened by the Dixie Fire.

== History and industries ==
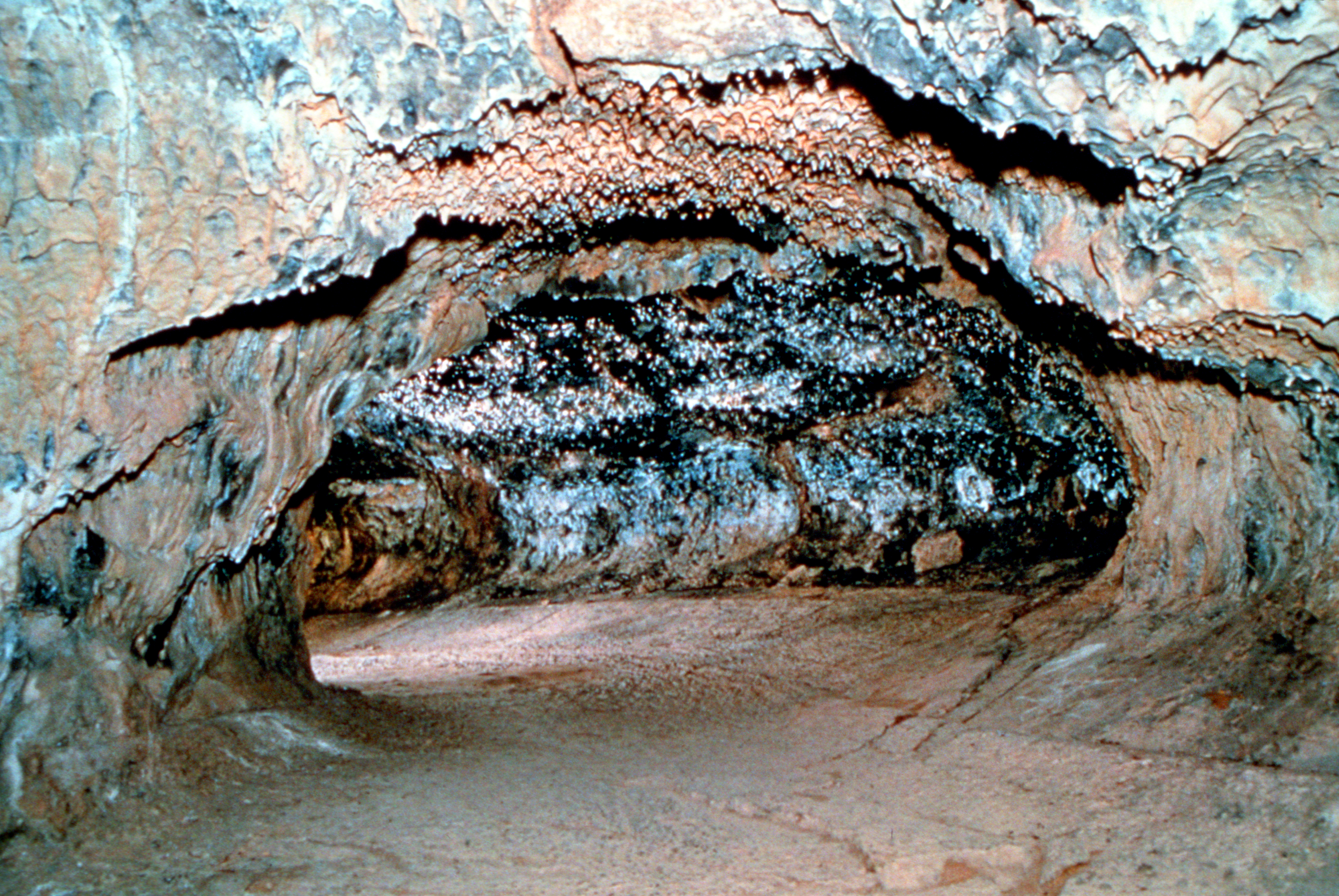
Subway Cave lava tube

Old Station was once a stagecoach stop on the trail from Sacramento to Yreka in 1857. It was also a temporary military post while soldiers patrolled the stage road. Old Station also sits on an alternate route of the historic Nobles Emigrant Trail to California that was used by gold seekers around 1852. It now has mostly traveler services including 1 gas station, 3 general stores, and many campgrounds. It is the southern gateway to the Hat Creek Recreation Area. It is home to Subway Cave, the largest lava tube formed by the local lava eruption from vents near Old Station. There is a two-mile Spatter Cone trail that leads from a United States Forest Service trailhead just off Highway 89/44.

== Geography ==
According to the United States Census Bureau, the CDP covers an area of 2.2 square miles (5.8 km^{2}), of which 99.94% is land and 0.06% is water.

=== Climate ===
This region experiences warm (but not hot) and dry summers, with no average monthly temperatures above 71.6 °F. According to the Köppen Climate Classification system, Old Station has a warm-summer Mediterranean climate, abbreviated "Csb" on climate maps.

== Demographics ==
Historical population
Census	Pop.	Note	%±
2010	51		—
2020	64		25.5%
U.S. Decennial Census; 2010

Old Station first appeared as a census designated place in the 2010 U.S. census.

The 2020 United States census reported that Old Station had a population of 64. The population density was 28.8 inhabitants per square mile (11.1/km^{2}). The racial makeup of Old Station was 62 (97%) White, 1 (2%) Asian, and 1 (2%) from two or more races. Hispanic or Latino of any race were 2 persons (3%).

There were 37 households, and the average household size was 1.73. The median age was 61.8 years.

There were 93 housing units at an average density of 41.9 units per square mile (16.2 units/km^{2}), of which 37 (40%) were occupied year round and 56 (60%) were used seasonally. Of the occupied housing units, 33 (89%) were owner-occupied, and 4 (11%) were occupied by renters.

== Politics ==
In the state legislature Old Station is located in the 1st senatorial district, represented by Republican Megan Dahle, and the 1st Assembly district, represented by Republican Heather Hadwick.

Federally, Old Station is in California's 1st congressional district, represented by Republican James Gallagher.
