= Mill Creek, California =

Unincorporated community in California, United States

- Unincorporated community
- Location within California Location within the United States
- Coordinates: 40°19′35″N 121°31′22″W
- Country: United States
- State: California
- County: Tehama
- Elevation: 4,737 ft (1,444 m)
- Time zone: UTC-8 (Pacific (PST))
  - Summer (DST): UTC-7 (PDT)
- ZIP code: 96061
- Area code: 530
- GNIS feature ID: 1659127

Mill Creek (formerly Mill Creek Homesite) is an unincorporated place in Tehama County, California, United States, most noted for its proximity to Lassen Peak. It is located at an elevation of 4737 feet (1444 m).

The community takes its name from nearby Mill Creek.

Mill Creek is part of the larger Mineral, California census-designated place, established in or after 1980.
