= California county routes in zone A =

Road network in California, United States

- Example of a California county route shield

Highway names
- County: County Route X (CR X) or Route X

System links
- County routes in California

There are 28 routes assigned to the "A" zone of the California Route Marker Program, which designates county routes in California. The "A" zone includes county highways in Lassen, Plumas, Shasta, Siskiyou, and Tehama counties.

== A1 ==
County Road A1
- Location: Lassen County
- Length: 35.30 mi (56.81 km)
- Existed: 1963–present

County Route A1 (CR A1), more commonly known as Route of the Olympic Torch, is a 35.3-mile (56.8 km) county route in Lassen County, California, United States. It gained its name as a result of being used for a portion of the 1984 Summer Olympics torch relay.

County Route A1 runs from Route 36 near Susanville to Route 139 near Eagle Lake. It was originally named Eagle Lake Road.

This route still exists as a bypass from Susanville for north–south motorists, but it is no longer signed as such.

Major junctions
The entire route is in Lassen County.

Location	mi	km	Destinations	Notes
	0.0	0.0	SR 36 – Red Bluff, Susanville	Southern terminus
	14.2	22.9	Gallatin Road	
Spaulding	27.1	43.6	Lake View Drive	Only major road access to Spaulding
	35.3	56.8	SR 139 – Susanville, Adin	Northern terminus
1.000 mi = 1.609 km; 1.000 km = 0.621 mi

== A2 ==
County Road A2
- Susanville Road
- Location: Lassen County
- Length: 11.41 mi (18.36 km)
- Existed: 1958–present

County Route A2 (CR A2), known entirely as Susanville Road, is a county route in Lassen County, California, United States, connecting SR 299 to SR 139.

Major junctions
The entire route is in Lassen County.

Location	mi	km	Destinations	Notes
Bieber	0.0	0.0	SR 299 / Bieber Lookout Road – Alturas, Bieber, Mount Shasta, Redding, Tulelake, Klamath Falls	Western terminus
	1.4	2.3	Valley Cutoff Road	
	8.4	13.5	Bassett Road	
	11.4	18.3	SR 139 – Susanville, Adin	Eastern terminus
1.000 mi = 1.609 km; 1.000 km = 0.621 mi

== A3 ==
County Road A3
- Standish-Buntingville Road
- Location: Buntingville–Standish
- Length: 8.45 mi (13.60 km)
- Existed: 1958–present

County Route A3 (CR A3), or Standish–Buntingville Road, is a road in Lassen County, California, United States, connected to U.S. Route 395, and functions as a bypass for northbound traffic around Susanville. At its northern end it is signed for Reno (via US 395), and its southern end for Lakeview, also via US 395.

This route still serves as bypass for north–south US 395 motorists, but is no longer signed as such.

Major junctions
The entire route is in Lassen County.

Location	mi	km	Destinations	Notes
	0.0	0.0	US 395 – Susanville, Reno	Southern terminus
Buntingville	0.2	0.32	Lakecrest Road	
	2.2	3.5	Sunnyside Road	
	6.5	10.5	Capezzoli Lane	
Standish	8.5	13.7	US 395 – Alturas, Klamath Falls	Northern terminus
1.000 mi = 1.609 km; 1.000 km = 0.621 mi

== A5 ==
County Road A5
- Bowman Road
- Location: Rosewood–Cottonwood
- Length: 14.27 mi (22.97 km)
- Existed: 1958–present

County Route A5 (CR A5), or Bowman Road, is a road in Tehama County, California, United States, connecting SR 36 in Rosewood to I-5 in Cottonwood.

Major junctions
The entire route is in Tehama County.

Location	mi	km	Destinations	Notes
Rosewood	0.0	0.0	SR 36 – Platina, Red Bluff	Western terminus
	11.3	18.2	Evergreen Road / Plateau Drive	Trucks not advisable on Evergreen Road
	11.8	19.0	Hooker Creek Road	Only major road access to Hooker
	14.3	23.0	I-5 – Red Bluff, Redding	Interchange; eastern terminus; western terminus of CR A17; I-5 exit 662; former US 99 south
	14.3	23.0	CR A17 (Main Street) / Lake California Drive – Cottonwood, Lake California	Continuation beyond I-5
1.000 mi = 1.609 km; 1.000 km = 0.621 mi

== A6 ==
County Road A6
- Manton Road
- Location: Dales–Manton
- Length: 15.60 mi (25.11 km)
- Existed: 1958–present

County Route A6 (CR A6), or Manton Road, is a road in Tehama County, California, United States, connecting SR 36 in Dales to Forward Road in Manton.

Major junctions
The entire route is in Tehama County.

Location	mi	km	Destinations	Notes
Dales	0.0	0.0	SR 36 – Red Bluff, Susanville	Western terminus
	8.8	14.2	Wildcat Road	
Manton	15.6	25.1	Forward Road, Manton Road – Shingletown	Eastern terminus
1.000 mi = 1.609 km; 1.000 km = 0.621 mi

== A7 ==
County Road A7
- Location: Tehama County
- Length: 4.96 mi (7.98 km)
- Existed: 1958–present

County Route A7 (CR A7) is a road in Tehama County, California, United States, connecting Ridge Road to SR 36 in Red Bluff. The route is known as Live Oak Road, Wilder Road, and Walnut Street.

Major junctions
The entire route is in Tehama County.

Location	mi	km	Destinations	Notes
	0.0	0.0	Live Oak Road, Ridge Road	Western terminus
	3.3	5.3	Baker Road	
Red Bluff	3.5	5.6	Paskenta Road	
Red Bluff			SR 36 / I-5 BL (Main Street) / Walnut Street	Eastern terminus; former US 99
1.000 mi = 1.609 km; 1.000 km = 0.621 mi

== A8 ==
County Road A8
- Location: Tehama County
- Length: 13.53 mi (21.77 km)
- Existed: 1967–present

County Route A8 (CR A8) is a road in Tehama County, California, United States, connecting SR 99 in Los Molinos to SR 36 in Red Bluff. The route is known as Aramayo Way in Los Molinos, C Street and 5th Street in Tehama, San Benito Avenue, Road 99W or State Highway 99W (despite the old highway being a U.S. Route), and South Main Street and Main Street in Red Bluff.

The route between Proberta and Red Bluff follows the former U.S. Route 99W up to where it met up with former U.S. Route 99E (present day SR 36 / Antelope Boulevard), reuniting both with the former U.S. Route 99 (at the intersection of Main Street and Antelope Boulevard / Oak Street) in downtown Red Bluff.

Major junctions
The entire route is in Tehama County.

Location	mi	km	Destinations	Notes
Los Molinos	0.0	0.0	SR 99	Southern terminus; former US 99E
Tehama	1.4	2.3	CR A11 (5th Street) / Tehama Avenue – Corning	Eastern terminus of CR A11
Proberta	6.1	9.8	State Highway 99W, Kindlespire Road	Former US 99W south
Proberta	6.2	10.0	Flores Avenue	
Rawson	10.7	17.2	Riverside Avenue	
Red Bluff			I-5 – Redding, Sacramento, San Francisco	Interchange; south end of I-5 BL overlap; I-5 north exit 647; south exit 647A
Red Bluff	13.5	21.7	SR 36 / I-5 BL north (Main Street, Antelope Boulevard) / Oak Street	Northern terminus; north end of I-5 BL overlap; Main Street is former US 99 north; Antelope Boulevard is former US 99E south
1.000 mi = 1.609 km; 1.000 km = 0.621 mi: Concurrency terminus

== A9 ==
County Road A9
- Location: Tehama County
- Length: 30.27 mi (48.71 km)
- Existed: 1967–present

County Route A9 (CR A9) is a road in Tehama County, California, United States, connecting Round Valley Road in Paskenta to SR 99 near Vina. The route is known as Paskenta Road, Corning Road, Solano Street in Corning, Hoag Road, Hall Road, and South Avenue.

Major junctions
The entire route is in Tehama County.

Location	mi	km	Destinations	Notes
Paskenta	0.0	0.0	Round Valley Road	Western terminus
	0.6	0.97	Lowrey Road	
Flournoy	6.6	10.6	Paskenta Road	
	18.7	30.1	Rawson Road	
Corning	19.6	31.5	I-5 – Sacramento, Redding	Interchange; I-5 exit 631
Corning	19.7	31.7	Highway 99W, Edith Avenue	Former US 99W south
Corning	20.7	33.3	Third Street	Former US 99W north
	25.1	40.4	South Avenue, Hall Road	
Vina	30.3	48.8	SR 99 – Chico, Red Bluff	Eastern terminus; former US 99E
1.000 mi = 1.609 km; 1.000 km = 0.621 mi

== A10 ==
County Road A10
- Location: Siskiyou County
- Length: 15.19 mi (24.45 km)
- Existed: 1959–present

County Route A10 (CR A10), known locally as "Everitt Memorial Highway", is a 15.19-mile (24.4 km) long county road in Siskiyou County, California, United States, near Mount Shasta. It runs from Interstate 5 in the town of Mount Shasta City to a dead end at the 8,000-foot (2,400 m) level on 14,162-foot (4,317 m) Mount Shasta. The route follows Lake Street, Mount Shasta Boulevard, Alma Street, and Rockfellow Drive, right before reaching Everitt Memorial Highway.

The highway, completed in 1958 at a cost of $980,000 and designated in 1959, was originally built to provide access to the Mount Shasta Ski Bowl, which was destroyed by an avalanche in 1978. Today, the highway provides access to Mount Shasta for climbers, skiers, and anyone wanting access to the mountain.

In wintertime, the road is kept open only to the U.S.F.S. outpost at the 6,000-foot (1,800 m) level.

Major junctions
The entire route is in Siskiyou County.

Location	mi	km	Destinations	Notes
Mount Shasta	0.0	0.0	West Jessie Street, Hatchery Lane	Continuation beyond I-5
Mount Shasta	0.0	0.0	I-5 – Weed, Dunsmuir	Interchange; western terminus; I-5 exit 738
Mount Shasta	0.5	0.80	North Mount Shasta Boulevard south (I-5 BL south) / East Lake Street	West end of I-5 BL overlap; former US 99 south
Mount Shasta	0.7	1.1	North Mount Shasta Boulevard north (I-5 BL north) / West Alma Street	East end of I-5 BL overlap; former US 99 north
Mount Shasta	1.1	1.8	Rockfellow Drive west	
Mount Shasta	1.3	2.1	North Washington Drive, Rockfellow Drive east	
	15.2	24.5	Old Ski Bowl Trailhead	Eastern terminus; dead end
1.000 mi = 1.609 km; 1.000 km = 0.621 mi: Concurrency terminus

== A11 ==
County Road A11
- Location: Tehama County
- Length: 5.16 mi (8.30 km)
- Existed: 1967–present

County Route A11 (CR A11) is a county route in Tehama County, California, United States, connecting Interstate 5 at exit 636 with CR A8 in Tehama. The route is mostly known as Gyle Road, while most of the portion within the city of Tehama is known as 5th Street.

Major junctions
The entire route is in Tehama County.

Location	mi	km	Destinations	Notes
	0.0	0.0	Gyle Road – Rancho Tehama	Continuation beyond I-5
	0.0	0.0	I-5 – Sacramento, Redding	Interchange; western terminus; I-5 exit 636
	0.3	0.48	Truckee Avenue	
	1.8	2.9	State Highway 99W	Former US 99W
	4.2	6.8	Hall Road	
Tehama	5.2	8.4	CR A8 / Tehama Avenue – Los Molinos, Gerber	Eastern terminus
1.000 mi = 1.609 km; 1.000 km = 0.621 mi

== A12 ==
County Road A12
- 99-97 Cutoff
- Location: Siskiyou County
- Length: 17.90 mi (28.81 km)
- Existed: 1959–present

County Route A12 (CR A12), known locally as the "99-97 Cutoff", or more commonly, "the 97 cutoff", is a two-lane rural highway in Siskiyou County, California, United States, with a length of 17.9 miles (28.8 km). A12 begins in the west at its junction with Old 99 Highway, which was once US 99. Just a few dozen yards to the east, it intersects Interstate 5. Its eastern terminus is at US 97, 12 miles (19 km) north of Weed.

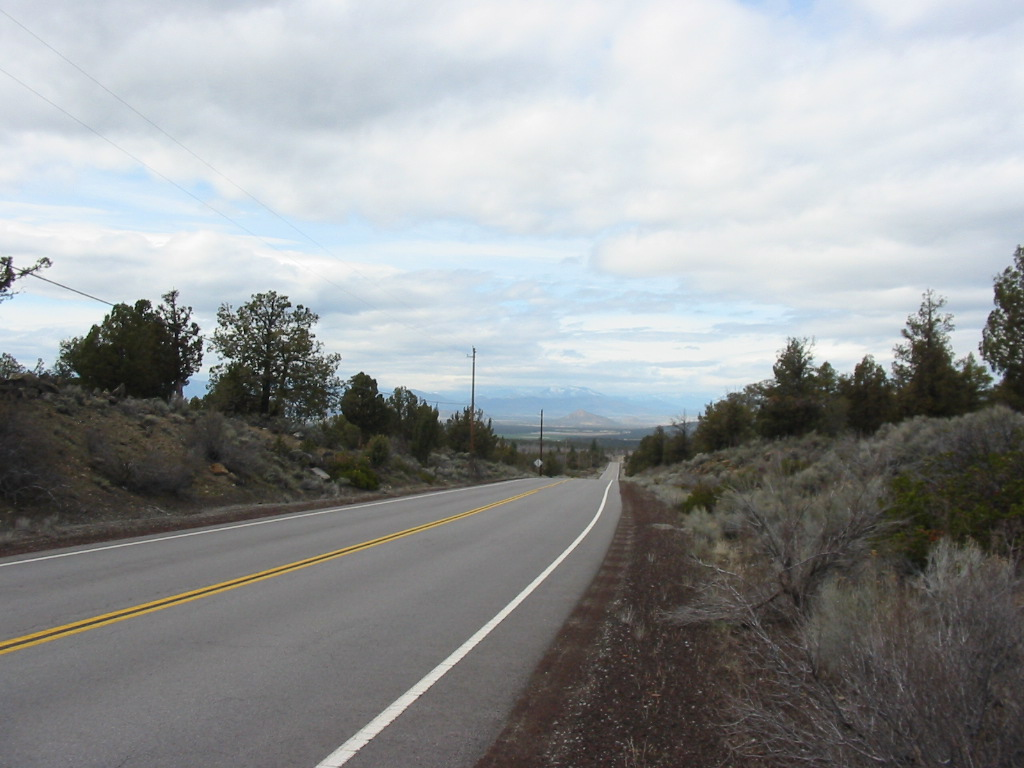
CR A12

One mile east of the Interstate junction, it passes through the tiny village of Grenada, the only population center of any merit along the route. 7 miles (11 km) further east is the burg Mayten, which consists only of a convenience store, a church, and an elementary school.

The route is heavily used by travelers and truckers southbound on Interstate 5 who wish to use US 97 northbound en route to Klamath Falls and points north. This route saves over 13 miles (21 km) than if the alternative routing via I-5 to Weed, then north on US 97 was used. Hence, the local name "97 cutoff".

The western two-thirds of the route passes through agricultural areas, and is very reminiscent of two-lane farm roads in California's Central Valley. However, the eastern portion is very scenic, passing through an area with towering dark red crags and buttes to the north.

Major junctions
The entire route is in Siskiyou County.

Location	mi	km	Destinations	Notes
	0.0	0.0	99-97 Cutoff to Old Highway 99 – Yreka, Gazelle	Continuation beyond I-5; connects to former US 99
Grenada	0.0	0.0	I-5 – Redding, Portland	Interchange; western terminus; I-5 exit 766
Grenada	0.8	1.3	CR A28 (Montague Grenada Road) – Montague	Southern terminus of CR A28
	7.6	12.2	CR A29 (Big Springs Road) – Lake Shastina, Weed, Little Shasta	Northern terminus of CR A29; only major road access to Big Springs
	13.6	21.9	Harry Cash Road – Little Shasta	
	18	29	US 97 – Weed, Dorris	Eastern terminus
1.000 mi = 1.609 km; 1.000 km = 0.621 mi

== A13 ==
County Road A13
- Walker Memorial Road
- Location: Plumas County
- Length: 3.79 mi (6.10 km)
- Existed: 1959–present

County Route A13 (CR A13), known entirely as Walker Memorial Road, is a road in Plumas County, California, United States, connecting SR 36 to SR 147.

Major junctions
The entire route is in Plumas County.

Location	mi	km	Destinations	Notes
	0.0	0.0	Road 322	Continuation beyond SR 36
	0.0	0.0	SR 36 – Susanville, Chester	Western terminus
Lake Almanor Peninsula	1.4	2.3	Foxwood Drive	Only major road access to Lake Almanor Peninsula
Hamilton Branch	3.8	6.1	SR 147 – Greenville, Westwood	Eastern terminus
1.000 mi = 1.609 km; 1.000 km = 0.621 mi

== A14 ==
County Road A14
- Graeagle Johnsville Road
- Location: Plumas County
- Length: 5.69 mi (9.16 km)
- Existed: 1959–present

County Route A14 (CR A14), or Graeagle Johnsville Road, is a road in Plumas County, California, United States, connecting SR 89 in Graeagle to Main Street in Johnsville.

Major junctions
The entire route is in Plumas County.

Location	mi	km	Destinations	Notes
Johnsville	0.0	0.0	Main Street	Western terminus; only major road access to Johnsville
Plumas Eureka	3.7	6.0	Poplar Valley Road	Only major road access to Plumas Eureka
Mohawk	4.3	6.9	Mohawk Highway Road	
Graeagle	5.7	9.2	SR 89 – Truckee, Quincy	Eastern terminus
1.000 mi = 1.609 km; 1.000 km = 0.621 mi

== A15 ==
County Road A15
- Location: Plumas County
- Length: 8.35 mi (13.44 km)
- Existed: 1959–present

County Route A15 (CR A15), or Portola McLears Road for most of the route, is a road in Plumas County, California, United States, connecting SR 89 in Valley Ranch to SR 70 in Portola. On its northern end, after passing through the Old Town commercial district of Portola, A15 passes the Western Pacific Railroad Museum.

Major junctions
The entire route is in Plumas County.

Location	mi	km	Destinations	Notes
Valley Ranch	0.0	0.0	SR 89	Southern terminus
Gold Mountain	3.7	6.0	Bear Run Road, Village Trail Road	
Portola	7.8	12.6	Main Street	
Portola	8.2	13.2	South Gulling Street	
Portola	8.4	13.5	SR 70 (East Sierra Avenue, West Sierra Avenue)	Northern terminus
Portola	8.4	13.5	Gulling Street	Continuation beyond SR 70
1.000 mi = 1.609 km; 1.000 km = 0.621 mi

== A16 ==
County Road A16
- Location: Shasta County
- Length: 38.74 mi (62.35 km)
- Existed: 1960–present

County Route A16 (CR A16) is a county route in Shasta County, California, United States, connecting SR 36 in Platina to SR 273 in Redding. The route is known as Platina Road, Placer Road, and Placer Street in Redding.

Known locally as "Ditch Grade Road"; the final 6.5-mile (10.5 km) section before the junction with SR 36 closely follows the contour of hillside as this route was previously used to bring water to the mine at Platina. There is a rock formation some 6.5 miles (10.5 km) from SR 36 known as Old Man Rock or The Lincoln Memorial.

Major junctions
The entire route is in Shasta County.

Location	mi	km	Destinations	Notes
Platina	0.0	0.0	Beegum George Road	Continuation beyond SR 36; unpaved road
Platina	0.0	0.0	SR 36 – Platina, Red Bluff	Western terminus
Igo	26.6	42.8	Clear Creek Road, Gas Point Road to SR 273 – Gas Point	
Igo	28	45	Cloverdale Road – Olinda, Anderson	
Centerville	31.5	50.7	Texas Springs Road	
Redding	37	60	Buenaventura Boulevard	
Redding	38.6	62.1	SR 273 south (California Street)	One-way southbound
Redding	38.7	62.3	SR 273 north (Pine Street)	Eastern terminus; one-way northbound
Redding	38.7	62.3	Placer Street	Continuation beyond SR 273
1.000 mi = 1.609 km; 1.000 km = 0.621 mi

== A17 ==
County Road A17
- Location: Tehama–Shasta County
- Length: 19.19 mi (30.88 km)
- Existed: 1963–present

County Route A17 (CR A17) is a county route in Shasta and Tehama counties in the U.S. state of California, connecting Interstate 5 near Cottonwood to SR 44 near Inwood. The route is known as Balls Ferry Road, Ash Creek Road, and Dersch Road. In Cottonwood, the route follows Main Street, Front Street, Magnolia Street, Chestnut Street, and First Street.

Major junctions

County	Location	mi	km	Destinations	Notes
Tehama		0.0	0.0	CR A5 (Bowman Road)	Continuation beyond I-5
Tehama		0.0	0.0	I-5 – Red Bluff, Redding	Interchange; western terminus; eastern terminus of CR A5; I-5 exit 662; former US 99 south
Tehama		0.0	0.0	Lake California Drive – Lake California	
Shasta	Cottonwood	1.2	1.9	Main Street	Former US 99 north
Shasta		3.8	6.1	Panorama Point Road	
Shasta		5.8	9.3	Balls Ferry Road	
Shasta		7.1	11.4	Gover Road	
Shasta		15.8	25.4	Dersch Road	
Shasta	Shingletown	19.2	30.9	SR 44	Eastern terminus
1.000 mi = 1.609 km; 1.000 km = 0.621 mi

== A18 ==
County Road A18
- Lake Boulevard
- Location: Shasta County
- Length: 8.83 mi (14.21 km)
- Existed: 1960–present
- Tourist routes: Lake Boulevard

County Route A18 (CR A18), or Lake Boulevard, is a road in Shasta County, California, United States, on the State Scenic Highway System connecting SR 273 (as well as Interstate 5 and SR 299) in Redding to Shasta Dam.

The southern end of CR A18 was the location of the only Shopko in the entire state of California, in Redding, which opened in 1989. The store was shuttered on May 5, 2019, as part of the chain's bankruptcy and liquidation.

Major junctions
The entire route is in Shasta County.

Location	mi	km	Destinations	Notes
Redding	0.0	0.0	SR 299 east (Lake Boulevard)	Continuation beyond SR 273; connects to I-5
Redding	0.0	0.0	SR 273 / SR 299 west (North Market Street)	Southern terminus; former US 99
Redding	2	3.2	Oasis Road	
Shasta Lake	4.6	7.4	Pine Grove Avenue, Walker Mine Road	
Shasta Lake	6.7	10.8	SR 151 (Shasta Dam Boulevard) to I-5 – Shasta Dam	
	8.8	14.2	SR 151 east (Shasta Dam Boulevard) / Shasta Dam Access Road	Roundabout; northern terminus; western terminus of SR 151; Shasta Dam Access Road is restricted to dam personnel
1.000 mi = 1.609 km; 1.000 km = 0.621 mi

== A19 ==
County Road A19
- McArthur Road
- Location: Shasta County
- Length: 17.40 mi (28.00 km)
- Existed: 1960–present

County Route A19 (CR A19), or McArthur Road, is a county route in Shasta County, California, United States, connecting SR 299 to SR 89.

Major junctions
The entire route is in Shasta County.

Location	mi	km	Destinations	Notes
	0.0	0.0	SR 89 – McCloud, Burney Falls, Lassen Park	Western terminus
Dana	4.6	7.4	Ted Elder Road	
	10.6	17.1	Island Road	
Glenburn	11.9	19.2	CR A20 (Glenburn Road)	Northern terminus of CR A20
McArthur	17.4	28.0	SR 299 – Redding, Alturas	Eastern terminus
1.000 mi = 1.609 km; 1.000 km = 0.621 mi

== A20 ==
County Road A20
- Glenburn Road
- Location: Fall River Mills – Glenburn
- Length: 5.56 mi (8.95 km)
- Existed: 1960–present

County Route A20 (CR A20), or Glenburn Road, is a county route in Shasta County, California, United States, connecting SR 89 to CR A19 (McArthur Road).

Major junctions
The entire route is in Shasta County.

Location	mi	km	Destinations	Notes
Fall River Mills	0.0	0.0	Bridge Street	Continuation beyond SR 299
Fall River Mills	0.0	0.0	SR 299 – Redding, Alturas	Southern terminus
	3.6	5.8	Gomez Road	Only major road access to Gomez
Glenburn	5.5	8.9	Brown Road	
Glenburn	5.6	9.0	CR A19 (McArthur Road) to SR 89 – McCloud	Northern terminus
1.000 mi = 1.609 km; 1.000 km = 0.621 mi

== A21 ==
County Road A21
- Location: Lassen County
- Length: 22.60 mi (36.37 km)
- Existed: 1963–present

County Route A21 (CR A21) is a county route in Lassen County, California, United States, connecting SR 147 to SR 44, intersecting SR 36 along the way. The route is known as 3rd Street and Ash Street in Westwood and Mooney Road for the remainder of the route.

Major junctions
The entire route is in Lassen County.

Location	mi	km	Destinations	Notes
Clear Creek	0.0	0.0	SR 147 – Chester, Red Bluff, Greenville, Quincy	Southern terminus
Westwood	3.5	5.6	SR 36 – Susanville, Chester	
	22.6	36.4	SR 44 – Susanville, Redding	Northern terminus
	22.6	36.4	FH 21 – Antelope Lookout, Champs Flat, Eagle Lake	Continuation beyond SR 44; unpaved road
1.000 mi = 1.609 km; 1.000 km = 0.621 mi

== A22 ==
County Road A22
- Location: Crescent Mills–Taylorsville
- Length: 4.54 mi (7.31 km)
- Existed: 1961–present

County Route A22 (CR A22) is a county route in Plumas County, California, United States, connecting SR 89 in Crescent Mills to Taylorsville. The route is mostly known as Arlington Road, along with a small section of Main Street in Taylorsville.

Major junctions
The entire route is in Plumas County.

Location	mi	km	Destinations	Notes
Crescent Mills	0.0	0.0	SR 89 – Quincy, Greenville	Western terminus
	1.7	2.7	Emigrant Road	
Taylorsville	4.5	7.2	Main Street / Nelson Street	Eastern terminus
1.000 mi = 1.609 km; 1.000 km = 0.621 mi

== A23 ==
County Road A23
- Location: Calpine–Beckwourth
- Length: 12.81 mi (20.62 km)
- Existed: 1961–present

County Route A23 (CR A23) is a county route in Plumas and Sierra counties in the U.S. state of California, connecting SR 49 / SR 89 near Sattley to SR 70 near Beckwourth passing through the Sierra Valley on its west side. In the northerly direction, CR A23 begins at the junction of SR 49 / SR 89 at Sattley, formerly known as Church's Corners, which is a census-designated place in Sierra County. The road leaves Sattley as Westside Road. It passes near Calpine, a census-designated place also in Sierra County, where the road becomes Beckwourth-Calpine Road and continues to SR 70 near Beckwourth, a census-designated place in Plumas County.

Major junctions

County	Location	mi	km	Destinations	Notes
Sierra	Calpine	0.0	0.0	SR 49 / SR 89 – Downieville, Quincy, Truckee	Southern terminus
Sierra		3.7	6.0	Calpine Road – Calpine	
Plumas	Beckwourth	12.8	20.6	SR 70 / Road 125 – Beckwourth, Portola	Northern terminus
1.000 mi = 1.609 km; 1.000 km = 0.621 mi

== A24 ==
County Road A24
- Location: Loyalton–Hawley
- Length: 15.35 mi (24.70 km)
- Existed: 1961–present

County Route A24 (CR A24) is a county route in Plumas and Sierra counties in the U.S. state of California, connecting SR 49 in Loyalton to SR 70 in Hawley. The route is known as 3rd Street and Beckwith Street in Loyalton, Beckwith Road, Sierra Valley Road, Dyson Lane, and Beckworth Loyalton Road.

Major junctions

County	Location	mi	km	Destinations	Notes
Sierra	Loyalton	0.0	0.0	3rd Street	Continuation beyond SR 49
Sierra	Loyalton	0.0	0.0	SR 49	Southern terminus
Plumas		6.3	10.1	Dyson Lane	
Plumas	Hawley	15.4	24.8	SR 70	Northern terminus
1.000 mi = 1.609 km; 1.000 km = 0.621 mi

== A25 ==
County Road A25
- Herlong Access Road
- Location: Herlong Junction–Patton Village
- Length: 4.20 mi (6.76 km)
- Existed: 1966–present

County Route A25 (CR A25), or Herlong Access Road, is a short highway in Lassen County, California, United States. Paired with CR A26, it services Herlong and the Sierra Army Depot.

Major junctions

The entire route is in Lassen County.

Location	mi	km	Destinations	Notes
Herlong Junction	0.0	0.0	US 395	Western terminus
	3.2	5.1	Honey Lake Road	Only major road access to Herlong Airport-H37
Patton Village	4.2	6.8	Pole Line Road	Eastern terminus
Patton Village	4.2	6.8	Herlong Access Road	Continuation beyond Pole Line Road
1.000 mi = 1.609 km; 1.000 km = 0.621 mi

== A26 ==
County Road A26
- Garnier Road
- Location: Lassen County
- Length: 3.82 mi (6.15 km)
- Existed: 1966–present

County Route A26 (CR A26), or Garnier Road, is a short highway in Lassen County, California, United States. Paired with CR A25, it services Herlong and the Sierra Army Depot.

Major junctions
The entire route is in Lassen County.

Location	mi	km	Destinations	Notes
	0.0	0.0	US 395	Southern terminus
	2.7	4.3	Herlong Landfill Road	
Patton Village	3.8	6.1	Herlong Access Road	Northern terminus
1.000 mi = 1.609 km; 1.000 km = 0.621 mi

== A27 ==
County Road A27
- Location: Susanville–Litchfield
- Length: 15.02 mi (24.17 km)
- Existed: 1971–present

County Route A27 (CR A27) is a county route in Lassen County, California, United States, connecting SR 36 in Susanville to US 395 in Litchfield, passing by the High Desert State Prison. The route is known as East Riverside Drive in Susanville, Johnstonville Road, and Center Road.

Major junctions
The entire route is in Lassen County.

Location	mi	km	Destinations	Notes
Susanville	0.0	0.0	SR 36	Western terminus
Susanville	0.5	0.80	Skyline Road	
Johnstonville	3.8	6.1	Johnstonville Road – Johnstonville	
Leavitt	6.2	10.0	Rice Canyon Road	Serves High Desert State Prison
	10.2	16.4	Belfast Road	Only major road access to Belfast
Litchfield	13.2	21.2	Cut Off Road	
Litchfield	15	24	US 395 – Reno	Eastern terminus
1.000 mi = 1.609 km; 1.000 km = 0.621 mi

== A28 ==
County Road A28
- Location: Siskiyou County
- Length: 20.1 mi (32.3 km)
- Existed: 1983–present

County Route A28 (CR A28) is a two-lane rural highway in Siskiyou County, California, United States, connecting CR A12 (the 99-97 Cutoff) to Copco Road near Hornbrook. The route is known as Montague Grenada Road, 11th Street in Montague, and Ager Road.

CR A28 begins at CR A12 in Grenada, connecting Grenada with Interstate 5 near Hornbrook via Montague. It is a flat, level route, and for this reason, was the original preferred routing for both US 99 and I-5 through the area. In both instances, the routing was changed because of intense lobbying by officials in Yreka, who decried the fact that the major highway through the county would bypass the county seat. Thus, both highways ended up being built over far more rigorous terrain at a huge cost increase.

A28 serves the aforementioned three towns, as well as numerous homes and ranches along the way.

Major junctions
The entire route is in Siskiyou County.

Location	mi	km	Destinations	Notes
Grenada	0.0	0.0	CR A12 (99-97 Cutoff) – Weed, Big Springs, Klamath Falls	Southern terminus
	4.3	6.9	Oberlin Road / Breceda Lane – Yreka	
Montague	5.7	9.2	SR 3 south (Montague Road) – Yreka	South end of SR 3 overlap
Montague	6.0	9.7	SR 3 north (East Webb Street) / West Webb Street	North end of SR 3 overlap
	9.0	14.5	Yreka Ager Road / Shelley Road – Yreka	Serves Siskiyou County Airport
	15.3	24.6	York Road	
Ager	16.6	26.7	Ager Beswick Road – Copco Lake	
	20.1	32.3	Copco Road – Hornbrook, Iron Gate Lake	Northern terminus
1.000 mi = 1.609 km; 1.000 km = 0.621 mi: Concurrency terminus

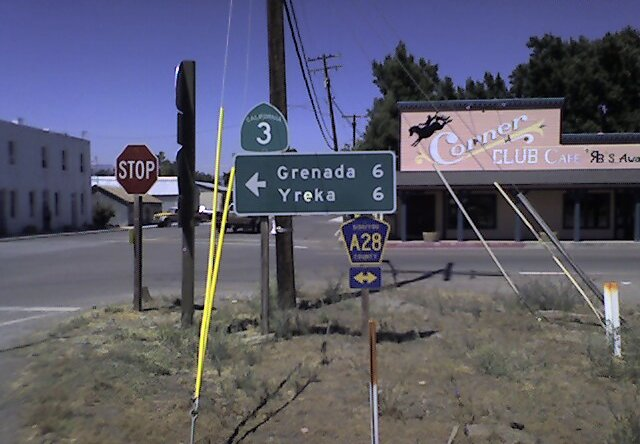
CR A28 at SR 3 in Montague

== A29 ==
County Road A29
- Big Springs Road
- Location: Siskiyou County
- Length: 11.60 mi (18.67 km)
- Existed: 1983–present

County Route A29 (CR A29), or Big Springs Road, is a county route in Siskiyou County, California, United States. It connects US 97 to CR A12 (the 99-97 Cutoff), passing through the census-designated place of Lake Shastina and the unincorporated community of Big Springs.

Major junctions
The entire route is in Siskiyou County.

Location	mi	km	Destinations	Notes
	0.0	0.0	US 97 – Weed, Dorris	Southern terminus
Lake Shastina	1.7	2.7	Jackson Ranch Road	Only major road access to Lake Shastina
Big Springs	9.5	15.3	East Louie Road	
	11.6	18.7	CR A12 (99-97 Cutoff)	Northern terminus
	11.6	18.7	Big Springs Road	Continuation beyond CR A12
1.000 mi = 1.609 km; 1.000 km = 0.621 mi
