= County routes in California =

County-operated highway system in California

- Example of a California county route shield

System information
- Notes: County routes in California are generally county-maintained.

Highway names
- County: County Route X (CR X) or Route X

System links
- County routes in California

County routes in the U.S. state of California are controlled and maintained by the respective counties in which they are located. However, they are generally patrolled by the state's California Highway Patrol. They are typically major thoroughfares in rural areas, although many run through urban areas as well. Most are two-lane highways, and can accommodate high speeds and large volumes of traffic.

County routes are typically designated with a letter (A, B, D, E, G, J, N, R, or S, depending on the region of the state, with several counties split between two region prefixes) followed by a number (example: G2). Therefore, the county routes are sorted alphabetically, from the northernmost region of California to the southernmost region. Routes with letters (A, B, D) are in the region of Northern California, letters (E, G, J) are in Central California, and (N, R, S) are in Southern California. Routes in Lake and San Bernardino Counties are designated by numbers only.

The level of signage varies by county. In San Diego County, reassurance markers are placed as frequently as they would be on state highways. In other counties, some county routes are completely unsigned. For most county routes, signage may be found at the beginning and end and at major junctions; reassurance markers are rare and are placed at distant intervals. With a handful of exceptions (one example being S2), county routes are typically referred to by their street name (e.g. Angeles Forest Highway or Kanan Dume Road) rather than their route designation.

These routes are all part of the California Route Marker Program, which was established in 1958. This program was incorporated into the National Uniform County Route Marker Program created by the National Association of Counties in 1967. Not all counties choose to use the same marker; some have different systems of numbering their county routes.

Lake County also maintains 612 miles (985 km) of county roads, which are not listed here.

== List ==
The county routes are alphabetically sorted by the prefix letter in its shield, followed by the corresponding number.

Number	Length (mi)	Length (km)	Southern or western terminus	Northern or eastern terminus	Counties	Formed	Removed	Notes
CR A1	35.30	56.81	SR 36	SR 139	Lassen	1983	current	
CR A2	11.41	18.36	SR 299	SR 139	Lassen	1958	current	
CR A3	8.45	13.60	US 395 in Buntingville	US 395 in Standish	Lassen	1958	current	
CR A5	14.27	22.97	SR 36 in Rosewood	I-5 in Cottonwood	Tehama	1958	current	
CR A6	15.60	25.11	Malton Road in Dales	Forward Road	Tehama	1958	current	
CR A7	4.96	7.98	Live Oak Road in Red Bluff	SR 36 in Red Bluff	Tehama	1958	current	
CR A8	13.53	21.77	SR 99 in Tehama	SR 36 in Red Bluff	Tehama	1967	current	
CR A9	30.27	48.71	Round Valley Road Paskenta	SR 99 in Corning	Tehama	1967	current	
CR A10	15.19	24.45	I-5	Mount Shasta	Siskiyou	1959	current	
CR A11	5.16	8.30	I-5 in Tehama	CR A8 in Tehama	Tehama	1967	current	
CR A12	17.90	28.81	I-5	US 97	Siskiyou	1959	current	
CR A13	3.79	6.10	SR 147 in Hamilton Branch	SR 36 in Hamilton Branch	Plumas	1959	current	
CR A14	5.69	9.16	SR 89	Johnsville	Plumas	1959	current	
CR A15	8.35	13.44	SR 89 in Portola	SR 36 in Portola	Plumas	1959	current	
CR A16	38.74	62.35	SR 36	SR 273 in Redding	Shasta	1960	current	
CR A17	19.19	30.88	I-5	SR 44	Shasta, Tehama	1963	current	
CR A18	8.83	14.21	SR 273 in Redding	Shasta Dam	Shasta	1960	current	
CR A19	17.40	28.00	SR 299	SR 89	Shasta	1960	current	
CR A20	5.56	8.95	SR 89	CR A19	Shasta	1960	current	
CR A21	22.60	36.37	SR 147	SR 44	Lassen, Plumas	1963	current	This route was originally formed in 1933 as SR 183.
CR A22	4.54	7.31	SR 89	Nelson Street	Plumas	1961	current	
CR A23	12.81	20.62	SR 89 in Sattley	SR 70 in Beckwourth	Plumas, Sierra	1961	current	
CR A24	15.35	24.70	SR 49 in Loyalton	SR 70	Plumas, Sierra	1961	current	
CR A25	4.20	6.76	US 395	Pole Line Road	Lassen	1966	current	
CR A26	3.82	6.15	US 395	Herlong Access Road	Lassen	1966	current	
CR A27	15.02	24.17	SR 36 in Susanville	US 395	Lassen	1971	current	
CR A28	20.13	32.40	CR A21 in Grenada	Copco Road in Hornbrook	Siskiyou	—	—	
CR A29	11.61	18.68	US 97	CR A12	Siskiyou	—	—	
CR B1	—	—	SR 70 in Oroville	East of Oroville	Butte	1964	1970	Became part of SR 162
CR B2	7.50	12.07	SR 70 in Oroville	SR 162	Butte	1964	current	
CR C1	5.48	8.82	Warm Springs Resort in Geyserville	US 101	Sonoma	1975	current	Unsigned route
CR D1	2.62	4.22	Pebble Beach Drive in Crescent City	US 101 in Crescent City	Del Norte	1966	current	
CR D2	5.82	9.37	US 101 in Crescent City	Lake Earl Drive in Crescent City	Del Norte	1966	current	
CR D3	5.82	9.37	US 101 in Crescent City	US 101 in Crescent City	Del Norte	1966	current	
CR D4	3.43	5.52	US 101	US 101	Del Norte	1966	current	
CR D5	5.73	9.22	US 101	US 101	Del Norte	1966	current	
CR D6	0.31	0.50	Indian Road	US 101	Del Norte	1966	current	
CR D7	0.90	1.45	US 101	Klamath Road in Klamath River	Del Norte	1966	current	
CR D8	3.98	6.41	Klamath River	US 101	Del Norte	1966	current	
CR E1	3.91	6.29	Grover Hot Springs State Park	SR 89 in Markleeville	Alpine	1962	current	
CR E2	28.89	46.49	SR 99 in Elk Grove	I-80 in Roseville	Placer, Sacramento	1967	current	
CR E3	12.76	20.54	US 50 in Rancho Cordova	I-80 in Rocklin	Placer, Sacramento	1967	current	
CR E4	16.30	26.23	SR 16 in Esparto	I-5 in Dunnigan	Yolo	1968	current	
CR E5	4.03	6.49	SR 49 / SR 108 in Jamestown	SR 49 in Tuttletown	Tuolumne	1974	current	
CR E6	15.93	25.64	I-505 / SR 128	I-80 in Davis	Yolo	1968	current	
CR E7	14.32	23.05	I-80	SR 16 in Woodland	Solano, Yolo	1968	current	
CR E8	15.71	25.28	CR E6 in Davis	SR 113	Yolo	1968	current	
CR E9	13.08	21.05	SR 160	SR 160	Sacramento, Yolo	1968	current	
CR E10	9.86	15.87	I-505	SR 113	Yolo	1968	current	
CR E11	5.19	8.35	SR 113	SR 45 in Tyndall Landing	Yolo	1976	current	
CR E12	6.83	10.99	CR J8 in Elk Grove	CR E2 in Elk Grove	Sacramento	1971	current	
CR E13	14.79	23.80	CR J11	SR 99 / SR 104 in Galt	Sacramento	1971	current	
CR E14	17.62	28.36	Sacramento	CR E3 in Orangevale	Sacramento	1972	current	
CR E15	12.91	20.78	SR 120 in Yosemite Junction	SR 4 Copperopolis	Calaveras	1974	current	
CR E16	33.21	53.45	SR 49 Plymouth	US 50 Fresh Pond	Amador, El Dorado	1967	current	
CR E17	13.39	21.55	SR 108	Soulsbyville	Tuolumne	1974	current	Unsigned route
CR E18	12.78	20.57	SR 49	Columbia	Calaveras, Tuolumne	1974	current	
CR E19	3.12	5.02	SR 84	CR E9 in Clarksburg	Yolo	1976	current	
CR E20	19.93	32.07	CR E21	Log Cabin	Yuba	1977	current	
CR E21	46.45	74.75	SR 20 in Browns Valley	Warren Hill Road in La Porte	Butte, Plumas, Yuba	1977	current	
CR G1	5.42	8.72	SR 156 San Juan Bautista	Fremont Peak State Park	San Benito	1958	current	
CR G2	11.90	19.15	SR 85 Saratoga	SR 237 Sunnyvale	Santa Clara	1962	current	Quito Road and Lawrence Expressway portion is unsigned
CR G3	4.52	7.27	I-280 Los Altos Hills	US 101 Palo Alto	Santa Clara	1962	current	Page Mill Road and Oregon Expressway portion is unsigned
CR G4	14.11	22.71	SR 17 in Campbell	I-680 in Milpitas	Santa Clara	1962	current	San Tomas Expressway and Montague Expressway and Landess Avenue portion is unsigned; San Tomas Expressway and Montague Expressway and Landess Avenue portion was defined in 1978
CR G5	7.24	11.65	I-280 in Los Altos	CR G3 in Palo Alto	Santa Clara	1962	current	Foothill Expressway and Foothill Boulevard portion is unsigned
CR G6	12.33	19.84	CR G3 in Palo Alto	US 101 in San Jose	Santa Clara	1962	current	Central Expressway portion is unsigned
CR G7	3.25	5.23	SR 25	SR 152	Santa Clara	1962	current	
CR G8	29.38	47.28	SR 152 in Gilroy	SR 82 in San Jose	Santa Clara	1962	current	Almaden Expressway portion is unsigned
CR G9	4.17	6.71	US 101 in Gilroy	SR 152	Santa Clara	1963	current	
CR G10	10.34	16.64	SR 17 in Los Gatos	San Jose in SR 82	Santa Clara	1964	current	Blossom Hill Road portion is unsigned
CR G11	8.96	14.42	CR G12	US 101 / SR 156	Monterey	1965	current	
CR G12	10.54	16.96	US 101 / SR 156 in Prunedale	SR 129 in Watsonville	Monterey, Santa Cruz	1965	current	
CR G13	—	—	—	—	Monterey, San Benito	1965	current	
CR G14	—	—	—	—	Monterey, San Luis Obispo	1971	current	
CR G15	—	—	—	—	Monterey	1965	current	
CR G16	—	—	—	—	Monterey	1965	current	
CR G17	44.9	72.3	CR G16 near Millers Ranch	SR 1	Monterey	1965	current	also named Seco Road, Fort Romie Road, River Road, Reservation Road
CR G18	—	—	—	—	Monterey	1971	current	
CR G19	—	—	—	—	Monterey, San Luis Obispo	1971	current	
CR G20	—	—	—	—	Monterey	1971	current	
CR G21	9.5	15.3	CR G8	I-680	Santa Clara	1978	current	Capitol Expressway portion is unsigned
CR J1	69.71	112.19	SR 25	SR 33 / SR 180	Fresno, San Benito	1958	current	
CR J2	39.65	63.81	SR 4	I-580 in Livermore	Alameda, San Joaquin	1960	current	Route is part of De Anza National Historic Trail
CR J3	35.34	56.87	SR 132	SR 12 in Lodi	San Joaquin, Stanislaus	1960	current	
CR J4	27.99	45.05	CR J3	Discovery Bay	Alameda, Contra Costa, San Joaquin	1960	current	Route is part of De Anza National Historic Trail
CR J5	30.91	49.74	Ripon	CR J12	San Joaquin	1960	current	
CR J6	22.3	35.9	SR 108	SR 26	San Joaquin, Stanislaus	1960	current	
CR J7	64.48	103.77	SR 59 in Merced	SR 99 in Stockton	Merced, San Joaquin, Stanislaus	1960	current	
CR J8	43.73	70.38	SR 99 in Stockton	SR 99 in Sacramento	Sacramento, San Joaquin	1960	current	
CR J9	48.12	77.44	CR J17	I-5 in Stockton	San Joaquin, Stanislaus	1960	current	
CR J10	17.62	28.36	CR J8	SR 99 in Galt	Sacramento, San Joaquin	1960	current	
CR J11	6.18	9.95	CR E13	CR J8	Sacramento, San Joaquin	1960	current	
CR J12	19.47	31.33	—	—	San Joaquin	1960	current	
CR J13	4.16	6.69	—	—	San Joaquin	1964	current	Not shown in Caltran's database of routes in the County Signed Route program, so may be decommissioned
CR J14	48.64	78.28	—	—	Calaveras, Stanislaus	1974	current	
CR J15	—	—	—	—	Tulare	1974	current	
CR J16	74.52	119.93	—	—	Mariposa, Merced, Stanislaus	1960	current	
CR J17	39.88	64.18	I-5	SR 59	Merced, Stanislaus	1960	current	
CR J18	27.02	43.48	I-5	SR 99	Merced, Stanislaus	1960	current	
CR J19	—	—	—	—	Fresno, Tulare	1964	current	
CR J20	—	—	SR 49 in Coulterville	SR 120	Mariposa, Tuolumne	1965	1997	Renumbered CR J132
CR J21	—	—	—	—	Tulare	1968	current	
CR J22	—	—	—	—	Tulare	1968	current	
CR J23	—	—	—	—	Tulare	1974	current	
CR J24	—	—	—	—	Tulare	1970	current	
CR J25	—	—	—	—	Tulare	1971	current	
CR J26	—	—	—	—	Tulare	1970	current	
CR J27	—	—	—	—	Tulare	1975	current	
CR J28	—	—	—	—	Tulare	1970	current	
CR J29	—	—	—	—	Tulare	1971	current	
CR J30	—	—	—	—	Tulare	1971	current	
CR J31	—	—	—	—	Tulare	1975	current	
CR J32	—	—	—	—	Tulare	1972	current	
CR J33	—	—	—	—	Tulare	1975	current	
CR J34	—	—	—	—	Tulare	1971	current	
CR J35	—	—	—	—	Tulare	1975	current	
CR J36	—	—	—	—	Tulare	1975	current	
CR J37	—	—	—	—	Tulare	1975	current	
CR J38	—	—	—	—	Tulare	1972	current	
CR J40	—	—	—	—	Fresno, Tulare	1974	current	
CR J41	—	—	—	—	Inyo, Tulare	1974	current	
CR J42	—	—	—	—	Tulare	1972	current	
CR J44	—	—	—	—	Kern, Tulare	1974	current	
CR J46	—	—	—	—	Tulare	1974	current	
CR J59	26.12	42.04	—	—	Merced, Stanislaus, Tuolumne	1961	current	Tuolumne County segment established in 1974
CR J132	—	—	SR 49 in Coulterville	SR 120	Mariposa, Tuolumne	1997	current	Former CR J20
CR N1	8.50	13.68	SR 1	US 101	Los Angeles	1963	current	
CR N2	38.42	61.83	SR 138	SR 14/SR 138	Los Angeles	1963	current	
CR N3	25.00	40.23	—	—	Los Angeles	1963	current	
CR N4	12.50	20.12	SR 138	SR 2	Los Angeles	1963	current	
CR N5	21.65	34.84	—	—	Los Angeles	1964	current	
CR N6	7.30	11.75	SR 138	Devil's Punchbowl	Los Angeles	1964	current	
CR N7	7.09	11.41	—	—	Los Angeles	1964	current	
CR N8	16.76	26.97	SR 39 in Buena Park	I-10 in West Covina	Los Angeles, Orange	1970	current	
CR N9	12.54	20.18	SR 1	US 101	Los Angeles	1974	current	
CR R1	29.62	47.67	—	—	Riverside	1964	1970	Redesignated as SR 243
CR R2	11.26	18.12	SR 177	Eagle Mountain	Riverside	1964	current	
CR R3	23.45	37.74	SR 79	SR 74 in Hemet	Riverside	1966	current	
CR S1	34.08	54.85	SR 94	SR 79	San Diego	1959	current	
CR S2	65.00	104.61	SR 98	SR 79	Imperial, San Diego	1970	current	
CR S3	12.10	19.47	SR 78	CR S22	San Diego	1968	current	
CR S4	8.86	14.26	I-15 in San Diego	SR 67 in Poway	San Diego	1959	current	
CR S5	4.98	8.01	CR S4 in Poway	I-15 in San Diego	San Diego	1959	current	
CR S6	50.84	81.82	CR S21 in Del Mar	Palomar Observatory	San Diego	1959	current	
CR S7	—	—	SR 76 in Pauma Valley	SR 76 near Lake Henshaw	San Diego	1959	current	
CR S8	—	—	CR S21 in Solana Beach	CR S6 in Rancho Santa Fe	San Diego	1959	current	
CR S9	—	—	CR S21 in Encinitas	CR S6 in Rancho Santa Fe	San Diego	1959	current	
CR S10	—	—	CR S9 in Encinitas	CR S14 in San Marcos	San Diego	1959	current	
CR S11	—	—	CR S9 in Encinitas	SR 78 in Oceanside	San Diego	1959	current	
CR S12	—	—	CR S21 in Carlsbad	I-15	San Diego	1961	current	
CR S13	—	—	SR 78 in Vista	I-15	San Diego	1968	current	Route is discontinuous between East Vista Way and South Mission Road
CR S14	—	—	SR 76 in Oceanside	Broadway in Escondido	San Diego	1968	current	
CR S15	—	—	CR S13	Old Highway 395	San Diego	1959	current	
CR S16	—	—	SR 76 in Pala	SR 79 in Temecula	Riverside, San Diego	1959	current	
CR S17	—	—	I-5 in Chula Vista	El Cajon	San Diego	1964	current	
CR S18	29.05	46.75	SR 133 in Laguna Beach	SR 55 in Orange	Orange	1970	current	
CR S19	—	—	—	—	Orange	1961	current	
CR S20	—	—	—	—	Santa Barbara	1967	1988	Replaced by rerouted SR 1
CR S21	24.74	39.82	I-5 in San Diego	I-5 in Camp Pendleton	San Diego	1968	current	
CR S22	—	—	CR S2	SR 86	Imperial, San Diego	—	—	
CR S24	—	—	—	—	Imperial	1970	current	
CR S25	—	—	—	—	Orange	—	—	
CR S26	—	—	—	—	Imperial	—	—	
CR S27	—	—	—	—	Imperial	—	—	
CR S28	—	—	—	—	Imperial	—	—	
CR S29	—	—	—	—	Imperial	—	—	
CR S30	—	—	—	—	Imperial	—	—	
CR S31	—	—	—	—	Imperial	—	—	
CR S32	—	—	—	—	Imperial	—	—	
CR S33	—	—	—	—	Imperial	—	—	
CR S34	—	—	SR 78	I-8	Imperial	—	—	
CR S78	—	—	—	—	Imperial	—	1970	Deleted and replaced by SR 78
CR S80	34.46	55.46	CR S2	SR 115	Imperial	—	—	
CR 66	175.7	282.8	1st Street in Oro Grande	US 95 northwest of Needles	San Bernardino	2011	current	This is the portion of the former U.S. Route 66 north of Victorville
CR 680	—	—	—	—	San Diego	—	1989	never built
Former
