= Standish =

Standish may refer to:

== Places ==
=== England ===
- Standish, Greater Manchester, a village in the Metropolitan Borough of Wigan
  - Standish Hall, a demolished estate and country house
- Standish-with-Langtree, a former urban district of Lancashire
- Standish, Gloucestershire

=== United States ===
- Standish, California
  - Standish Hall (Standish, California), a historic building
- Standish, Maine, a town
  - Standish (CDP), Maine, a village in the town
- Standish, Michigan
- Standish Township, Michigan
- Standish, Minneapolis, Minnesota, a neighborhood
- Standish, Missouri

== People ==
- Standish (surname), a list of people and fictional characters with the name
- Standish baronets
- Standish family, 13th- to 20th-century Lords of the Manor in the Manchester, England, locality
- Standish Backus (1910–1989), American military artist

== Other uses ==
- Standish Group, an American IT consulting company
- USS Standish (1864), an iron-hulled screw tug
