= Valley Ranch =

Valley Ranch is the name of some places in the United States:

- Valley Ranch, California, a census-designated place in Northern California
- Valley Ranch, Irving, Texas, a community in Irving, Texas, often called "Valley Ranch" by U.S. sports media
