= Patton Village =

Patton Village may refer to the following places in the United States:

- Patton Village, California, a census-designated place
- Patton Village, Texas, a city
