= Plumas Eureka, California =

Plumas Eureka
- Unincorporated Community; Census Designated Place
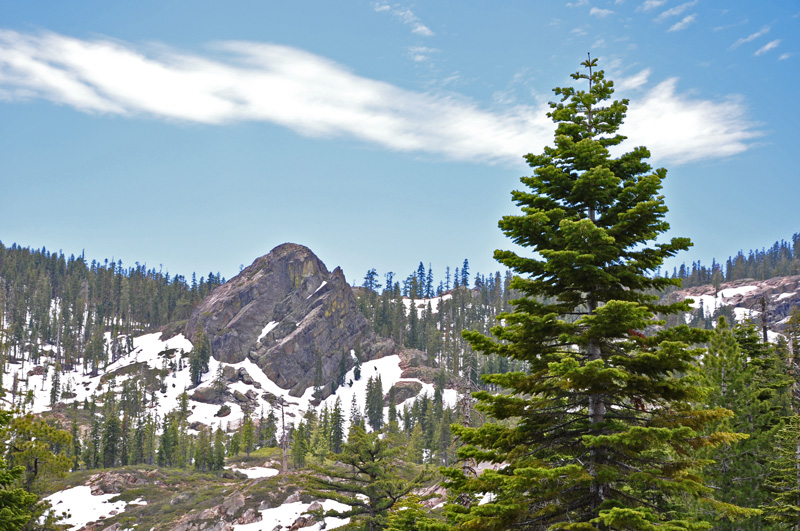

- Location in Plumas County and the state of California

- Location in the United States
- Coordinates: 39°47′23″N 120°39′6″W
- Country: United States
- State: California
- County: Plumas

Area
  - Total: 3.975 sq mi (10.295 km^{2})
  - Land: 3.975 sq mi (10.295 km^{2})
  - Water: 0 sq mi (0 km^{2}) 0%
- Elevation: 6,014 ft (1,833 m)

Population (2020)
  - Total: 334
  - Density: 84.0/sq mi (32.4/km^{2})
- Time zone: UTC-8 (Pacific (PST))
  - Summer (DST): UTC-7 (PDT)
- ZIP code: 96103
- Area code: 530
- FIPS code: 06-57828
- GNIS feature ID: 1701394

Plumas Eureka is a census-designated place (CDP) in Plumas County, California, United States. The population was 334 at the 2020 census.

== Geography ==
Plumas Eureka is located at 39°47′23″N 120°39′6″W (39.789608, -120.651553).

According to the United States Census Bureau, the CDP has a total area of 4.0 square miles (10.3 km^{2}), all land.

== Demographics ==
Historical population
Census	Pop.	Note	%±
2000	320		—
2010	339		5.9%
2020	334		−1.5%
U.S. Decennial Census; 1860–1870 1880-1890; 1900 1910 1920; 1930 1940 1950; 1960 1970 1980; 1990 2000 2010

Plumas Eureka first appeared as a census designated place in the 2000 U.S. census.

=== 2020 ===
Plumas Eureka CDP, California – Racial and ethnic composition Note: the US Census treats Hispanic/Latino as an ethnic category. This table excludes Latinos from the racial categories and assigns them to a separate category. Hispanics/Latinos may be of any race.
Race / Ethnicity (NH = Non-Hispanic)	Pop 2000	Pop 2010	Pop 2020	% 2000	% 2010	% 2020
White alone (NH)	313	312	287	97.81%	92.04%	85.93%
Black or African American alone (NH)	0	0	0	0.00%	0.00%	0.00%
Native American or Alaska Native alone (NH)	0	1	1	0.00%	0.29%	0.30%
Asian alone (NH)	1	3	3	0.31%	0.88%	0.90%
Native Hawaiian or Pacific Islander alone (NH)	0	0	0	0.00%	0.00%	0.00%
Other race alone (NH)	0	0	3	0.00%	0.00%	0.90%
Mixed race or Multiracial (NH)	2	6	17	0.63%	1.77%	5.09%
Hispanic or Latino (any race)	4	17	23	1.25%	5.01%	6.89%
Total	320	339	334	100.00%	100.00%	100.00%

The 2020 United States census reported that Plumas Eureka had a population of 334. The population density was 84.0 inhabitants per square mile (32.4/km^{2}). The racial makeup of Plumas Eureka was 289 (86.5%) White, 0 (0.0%) African American, 4 (1.2%) Native American, 3 (0.9%) Asian, 0 (0.0%) Pacific Islander, 10 (3.0%) from other races, and 28 (8.4%) from two or more races. Hispanic or Latino of any race were 23 persons (6.9%).

The whole population lived in households. There were 178 households, out of which 17 (9.6%) had children under the age of 18 living in them, 101 (56.7%) were married-couple households, 9 (5.1%) were cohabiting couple households, 32 (18.0%) had a female householder with no partner present, and 36 (20.2%) had a male householder with no partner present. 52 households (29.2%) were one person, and 26 (14.6%) were one person aged 65 or older. The average household size was 1.88. There were 115 families (64.6% of all households).

The age distribution was 22 people (6.6%) under the age of 18, 9 people (2.7%) aged 18 to 24, 39 people (11.7%) aged 25 to 44, 91 people (27.2%) aged 45 to 64, and 173 people (51.8%) who were 65 years of age or older. The median age was 65.5 years. For every 100 females, there were 112.7 males.

There were 525 housing units at an average density of 132.1 units per square mile (51.0 units/km^{2}), of which 178 (33.9%) were occupied. Of these, 143 (80.3%) were owner-occupied, and 35 (19.7%) were occupied by renters.

=== 2010 ===
At the 2010 census, Plumas Eureka had a population of 339. The population density was 85.2 inhabitants per square mile (32.9/km^{2}). The racial makeup of Plumas Eureka was 326 (96.2%) White, 0 (0.0%) African American, 1 (0.3%) Native American, 3 (0.9%) Asian, 0 (0.0%) Pacific Islander, 3 (0.9%) from other races, and 6 (1.8%) from two or more races. Hispanic or Latino of any race were 17 people (5.0%).

The whole population lived in households; no one lived in non-institutionalized group quarters and no one was institutionalized.

There were 167 households, of which 19 (11.4%) had children under the age of 18 living in them, 105 (62.9%) were opposite-sex married couples living together, 7 (4.2%) had a female householder with no husband present, and 1 (0.6%) had a male householder with no wife present. There were 11 (6.6%) unmarried opposite-sex partnerships, and 0 (0%) same-sex married couples or partnerships. 42 households (25.1%) were one person and 26 (15.6%) had someone living alone who was 65 or older. The average household size was 2.03. There were 113 families (67.7% of households); the average family size was 2.38.

The age distribution was 34 people (10.0%) under the age of 18, 13 people (3.8%) aged 18 to 24, 43 people (12.7%) aged 25 to 44, 140 people (41.3%) aged 45 to 64, and 109 people (32.2%) who were 65 or older. The median age was 59.0 years. For every 100 females, there were 94.8 males. For every 100 females age 18 and over, there were 100.7 males.

There were 523 housing units at an average density of 131.4 per square mile, of the occupied units 136 (81.4%) were owner-occupied and 31 (18.6%) were rented. The homeowner vacancy rate was 13.8%; the rental vacancy rate was 50.0%. 267 people (78.8% of the population) lived in owner-occupied housing units and 72 people (21.2%) lived in rental housing units.

=== 2000 ===
At the 2000 census, the median household income was $58,571 and the median family income was $59,643. Males had a median income of $54,286 versus $46,250 for females. The per capita income for the CDP was $30,706. None of the families and 4.9% of the population were living below the poverty line, including no under eighteens and 5.4% of those over 64.

== Politics ==
In the state legislature, Plumas Eureka is in the 1st senatorial district, represented by Republican Megan Dahle, and the 1st Assembly district, represented by Republican Heather Hadwick.

Federally, Plumas Eureka is in California's 3rd congressional district, represented by Independent Kevin Kiley.

== Education ==
The school district is Plumas Unified School District.
