= Shasta Lake, California =

City in California, United States

- City
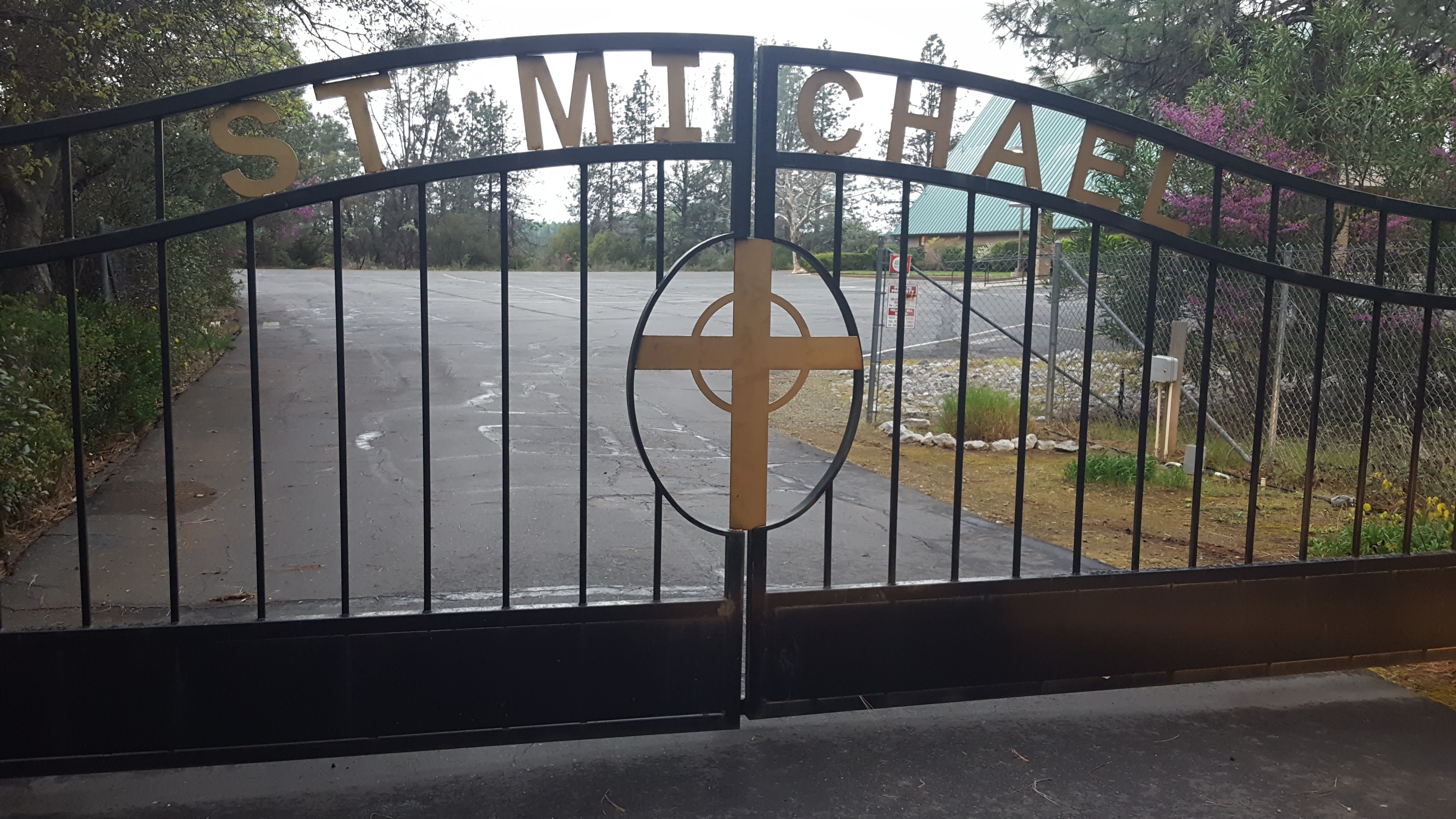
- St. Michael's Catholic Church
- Interactive map of Shasta Lake, California
- Location in the United States
- Coordinates: 40°40′52.3″N 122°21′59.8″W
- Country: United States
- State: California
- County: Shasta
- Incorporated: July 2, 1993

Area
  - Total: 10.93 sq mi (28.30 km^{2})
  - Land: 10.92 sq mi (28.29 km^{2})
  - Water: 0.0039 sq mi (0.01 km^{2}) 0.07%
- Elevation: 807 ft (246 m)

Population (2020)
  - Total: 10,371
  - Density: 949.5/sq mi (366.6/km^{2})
- Time zone: UTC-8 (Pacific (PST))
  - Summer (DST): UTC-7 (PDT)
- ZIP codes: 96019, 96079, 96089
- Area code(s): 530, 837
- FIPS code: 06-71225
- GNIS feature ID: 1662287
- Website: https://www.cityofshastalake.org/

The city of Shasta Lake, known as Central Valley or CV prior to incorporation, is a city in Shasta County, California, United States. It is the closest settlement to Shasta Dam and Shasta Lake reservoir, which are popular tourist destinations. Its population is 10,371 as of the 2020 census, up from 10,164 from the 2010 census.

== History ==
Shasta Lake City started out as five small communities named Central Valley, Toyon, Project City, Pine Grove, and Summit City, all of which came about with the beginning of construction of Shasta Dam in 1938. Project City was built at the intersection of U.S. Route 99 and Shasta Dam Boulevard; a larger Central Valley at a midpoint on Shasta Dam Boulevard; Summit City at the intersection of Shasta Dam and Lake boulevards; and Pine Grove at what today is the intersection of Interstate 5 and Pine Grove Avenue.

=== Toyon ===
The Bureau of Reclamation built the town of Toyon, first called Government Camp. Toyon was the premier community, built on 41 acres (17 hectares) of what was once the Seaman Ranch. By 1950 Toyon had two tennis courts, an outdoor basketball court, a Community Center, green lawns, concrete side walks, commercial water and power from Shasta Dam, its own sewage treatment plant, and its own landfill. Initially, Toyon also had two large dormitories for bachelor employees. All the residents of Toyon worked for the US Bureau of Reclamation. Bureau headquarters office and maintenance facilities were located on Kenneth Avenue, parallel to Shasta Dam Boulevard.

All bureau employees were forced to vacate Toyon by the end of 1964 when the facility was turned over to the Job Corps as a work camp as a part of President Lyndon Johnson's Great Society. The Job Corps supervision ended in 1972. Toyon was subsequently occupied by local Native Americans who hoped to stake claim and have Toyon recognized as tribal lands; this did not occur. Water and electric power were turned off after the Native Americans failed to pay a $28,000 utility bill. Conflicts between law enforcement and the occupying Native Americans continued, and a large number of the homes burned to the ground. The historic Seaman Ranch Community House and the large USBR headquarters building also burned to the ground in this era. Today, one metal storage building and the flagpole are the only remaining structures other than overgrown streets and sidewalks. The site is fenced off from Shasta Dam Boulevard.

The workers at Shasta Dam built these communities because land was cheap and most families needed low-cost housing while working on the dam. Later on, Central Valley became the commercial hub of workers on Shasta Dam. Initially, there was no water supply for these new communities, and attempts at digging wells produced very limited water supplies.

When oil production slowed down in the 1970s, Redding surpassed Central Valley in population in 1965 when it incorporated the community of Enterprise. The population figures in 1980 were Central Valley at 3,424, Project City at 1,659, and Summit City at 1,139. Talk of incorporation spread in the early 1990s and it became a reality on July 2, 1993, when 60% of the communities' people voted for incorporation.

Several restaurants, gas stations and a few motels encompass the area of the Shasta Dam Boulevard and Interstate 5 interchange. These were all built around 2000, and several more fast food outlets and motels are planned for this interchange.

Shasta Lake is located at 40°40′41″N 122°22′12″W (40.678167, -122.370003).

According to the United States Census Bureau, the city has a total area of 10.9 square miles (28 km^{2}), 99.93% of it is land and only 0.07% of it covered by water.

== Climate ==
Shasta Lake has a hot-summer Mediterranean climate (Csa) typical of the Northern California interior. Summers are hot and dry, with great diurnal temperature variation, while winters are wet and cool.

Climate data for Shasta Dam, California (normals 1981-2010)(extremes 1943-2020)
Month	Jan	Feb	Mar	Apr	May	Jun	Jul	Aug	Sep	Oct	Nov	Dec	Year
Record high °F (°C)	80 (27)	80 (27)	88 (31)	97 (36)	107 (42)	111 (44)	115 (46)	115 (46)	114 (46)	104 (40)	90 (32)	76 (24)	115 (46)
Mean daily maximum °F (°C)	53.0 (11.7)	57.0 (13.9)	62.3 (16.8)	68.6 (20.3)	77.6 (25.3)	86.5 (30.3)	95.3 (35.2)	94.3 (34.6)	88.1 (31.2)	76.0 (24.4)	60.3 (15.7)	52.7 (11.5)	72.6 (22.6)
Daily mean °F (°C)	46.3 (7.9)	49.2 (9.6)	53.0 (11.7)	58.0 (14.4)	66.3 (19.1)	74.5 (23.6)	81.8 (27.7)	80.6 (27.0)	75.2 (24.0)	65.2 (18.4)	52.9 (11.6)	46.3 (7.9)	62.4 (16.9)
Mean daily minimum °F (°C)	39.5 (4.2)	41.4 (5.2)	43.6 (6.4)	47.4 (8.6)	55.0 (12.8)	62.5 (16.9)	68.3 (20.2)	66.8 (19.3)	62.2 (16.8)	54.4 (12.4)	45.4 (7.4)	40.0 (4.4)	52.5 (11.4)
Record low °F (°C)	19 (−7)	21 (−6)	25 (−4)	28 (−2)	35 (2)	38 (3)	50 (10)	44 (7)	43 (6)	34 (1)	30 (−1)	14 (−10)	14 (−10)
Average precipitation inches (mm)	10.84 (275)	11.33 (288)	9.48 (241)	4.75 (121)	3.23 (82)	1.37 (35)	0.20 (5.1)	0.25 (6.4)	1.00 (25)	3.68 (93)	7.63 (194)	12.06 (306)	65.82 (1,672)
Average precipitation days	14	12	12	9	7	3	1	1	3	5	11	14	93
Source: NOAA

== Demographics ==
Historical population
Census	Pop.	Note	%±
2000	9,008		—
2010	10,164		12.8%
2020	10,371		2.0%
U.S. Decennial Census

=== 2020 census ===
As of the 2020 census, Shasta Lake had a population of 10,371 and a population density of 949.5 inhabitants per square mile (366.6/km^{2}). The median age was 41.4 years. The age distribution was 22.4% under the age of 18, 6.8% aged 18 to 24, 25.1% aged 25 to 44, 26.5% aged 45 to 64, and 19.2% aged 65 or older. For every 100 females, there were 98.1 males, and for every 100 females age 18 and over, there were 94.5 males age 18 and over.

The census reported that 99.8% of the population lived in households, 0.2% lived in non-institutionalized group quarters, and no one was institutionalized. In addition, 90.7% of residents lived in urban areas, while 9.3% lived in rural areas.

There were 4,091 households, out of which 31.1% had children under the age of 18 living in them. Of all households, 43.5% were married-couple households, 9.4% were cohabiting couple households, 27.9% had a female householder with no spouse or partner present, and 19.2% had a male householder with no spouse or partner present. About 25.5% of all households were made up of individuals, and 12.8% had someone living alone who was 65 years of age or older. The average household size was 2.53, and there were 2,697 families (65.9% of all households).

There were 4,373 housing units at an average density of 400.3 units per square mile (154.6 units/km^{2}), of which 4,091 (93.6%) were occupied. Of occupied units, 70.3% were owner-occupied and 29.7% were occupied by renters. 6.4% of housing units were vacant. The homeowner vacancy rate was 1.9%, and the rental vacancy rate was 2.4%.

Racial composition as of the 2020 census
Race	Number	Percent
White	8,230	79.4%
Black or African American	76	0.7%
American Indian and Alaska Native	328	3.2%
Asian	260	2.5%
Native Hawaiian and Other Pacific Islander	17	0.2%
Some other race	302	2.9%
Two or more races	1,158	11.2%
Hispanic or Latino (of any race)	942	9.1%

=== 2023 estimate ===
In 2023, the US Census Bureau estimated that the median household income was $61,319, and the per capita income was $29,281. About 9.9% of families and 16.1% of the population were below the poverty line.

=== 2010 census ===
The 2010 United States census reported that Shasta Lake had a population of 10,164. The population density was 930.0 inhabitants per square mile (359.1/km^{2}). The racial makeup of Shasta Lake was 8,749 (86.1%) White, 67 (0.7%) African American, 389 (3.8%) Native American, 233 (2.3%) Asian, 13 (0.1%) Pacific Islander, 201 (2.0%) from other races, and 512 (5.0%) from two or more races. Hispanic or Latino of any race were 865 persons (8.5%).

The Census reported that 10,147 people (99.8% of the population) lived in households, 17 (0.2%) lived in non-institutionalized group quarters, and 0 (0%) were institutionalized.

There were 3,943 households, out of which 1,325 (33.6%) had children under the age of 18 living in them, 1,830 (46.4%) were opposite-sex married couples living together, 566 (14.4%) had a female householder with no husband present, 280 (7.1%) had a male householder with no wife present. There were 342 (8.7%) unmarried opposite-sex partnerships, and 33 (0.8%) same-sex married couples or partnerships. 961 households (24.4%) were made up of individuals, and 413 (10.5%) had someone living alone who was 65 years of age or older. The average household size was 2.57. There were 2,676 families (67.9% of all households); the average family size was 3.00.

The population was spread out, with 2,467 people (24.3%) under the age of 18, 844 people (8.3%) aged 18 to 24, 2,511 people (24.7%) aged 25 to 44, 2,877 people (28.3%) aged 45 to 64, and 1,465 people (14.4%) who were 65 years of age or older. The median age was 38.8 years. For every 100 females, there were 99.5 males. For every 100 females age 18 and over, there were 95.9 males.

There were 4,209 housing units at an average density of 385.1 per square mile (148.7/km^{2}), of which 2,623 (66.5%) were owner-occupied, and 1,320 (33.5%) were occupied by renters. The homeowner vacancy rate was 2.0%; the rental vacancy rate was 5.2%. 6,588 people (64.8% of the population) lived in owner-occupied housing units and 3,559 people (35.0%) lived in rental housing units.

== Schooling ==
There are five schools located within the city: Grand Oaks Elementary School (K-5), Shasta Lake School (K-8), Buckeye School of the Arts (K-8), Central Valley High School (9-12) and Mountain Lakes High School (10-12). They are all a part of the Gateway Unified School District. Toyon School in Summit City was the first elementary school to open in the Central Valley area (it recently closed and is now home to Mountain Lakes High School). Subsequent schools were Project City and Central Valley elementary. Central Valley High School opened in 1956.

== Politics ==
In the state legislature Shasta Lake is located in the 1st senatorial district, represented by Republican Megan Dahle, and the 1st Assembly district, represented by Republican Heather Hadwick.

Federally, Shasta Lake is in California's 1st congressional district, represented by Republican James Gallagher.
