= Belfast, California =

Unincorporated community in California, United States

Belfast
- Unincorporated community
- Location in California Belfast (the United States)
- Coordinates: 40°26′37″N 120°27′06″W
- Country: United States
- State: California
- County: Lassen
- Elevation: 4,130 ft (1,260 m)

Belfast is an unincorporated area of Lassen County, California, United States. It is located 5.5 miles (8.9 km) northwest of Litchfield, at an elevation of 4134 feet (1260 m).

The town was founded by Capt. Charles A. Merrill in 1880. The name reflects Capt. Merrill's hometown of Belfast, Maine, which itself was named after the city of the same name in Northern Ireland. It was expected that a railroad would be built through the Belfast townsite, but this never happened. Merrill did, however, successfully build an irrigation flume to aid in farming; in 1922, the Belfast area was subdivided into forty-acre plots in the hopes of reestablishing a farming community. A few farms can be found in the area today.

The Willow Creek Canyon in the Belfast area is an important archaeological site, with rock structures and petroglyphs suggesting it was a major hunting ground to native peoples. The Belfast Site rock features are believed to be around 3,000 years old.
