= Lake Almanor Peninsula, California =

Lake Almanor Peninsula
- Unincorporated Community; Census Designated Place
- Location in Plumas County and the state of California

- Location in the United States
- Coordinates: 40°16′31″N 121°7′36″W
- Country: United States
- State: California
- County: Plumas

Area
  - Total: 3.036 sq mi (7.863 km^{2})
  - Land: 3.036 sq mi (7.863 km^{2})
  - Water: 0 sq mi (0 km^{2}) 0%

Population (2020)
  - Total: 366
  - Density: 121/sq mi (46.5/km^{2})
- Time zone: UTC-8 (Pacific (PST))
  - Summer (DST): UTC-7 (PDT)
- ZIP code: 96137
- Area codes: 530, 837
- FIPS code: 06-39420

Lake Almanor Peninsula is a census-designated place (CDP) in Plumas County, California, United States. The population was 366 at the 2020 census, up from 356 at the 2010 census.

== Geography ==
Lake Almanor Peninsula is located at 40°16′31″N 121°7′36″W (40.275319, -121.126715).

According to the United States Census Bureau, the CDP has a total area of 3.0 square miles (7.8 km^{2}), all land.

== Demographics ==
Historical population
Census	Pop.	Note	%±
2000	336		—
2010	356		6.0%
2020	366		2.8%
U.S. Decennial Census; 1860–1870 1880-1890; 1900 1910 1920; 1930 1940 1950; 1960 1970 1980; 1990 2000 2010

Lake Almanor Peninsula first appeared as a census designated place in the 2000 U.S. census.

=== 2020 ===
Lake Almanor Peninsula CDP, California – Racial and ethnic composition Note: the US Census treats Hispanic/Latino as an ethnic category. This table excludes Latinos from the racial categories and assigns them to a separate category. Hispanics/Latinos may be of any race.
Race / Ethnicity (NH = Non-Hispanic)	Pop 2000	Pop 2010	Pop 2020	% 2000	% 2010	% 2020
White alone (NH)	309	322	321	91.96%	90.45%	87.70%
Black or African American alone (NH)	0	0	2	0.00%	0.00%	0.55%
Native American or Alaska Native alone (NH)	4	9	0	1.19%	2.53%	0.00%
Asian alone (NH)	0	0	7	0.00%	0.00%	1.91%
Native Hawaiian or Pacific Islander alone (NH)	0	0	2	0.00%	0.00%	0.55%
Other race alone (NH)	0	0	0	0.00%	0.00%	0.00%
Mixed race or Multiracial (NH)	4	3	15	1.19%	0.84%	4.10%
Hispanic or Latino (any race)	19	22	19	5.65%	6.18%	5.19%
Total	336	356	366	100.00%	100.00%	100.00%

The 2020 United States census reported that Lake Almanor Peninsula had a population of 366. The population density was 120.6 inhabitants per square mile (46.6/km^{2}). The racial makeup of Lake Almanor Peninsula was 324 (88.5%) White, 2 (0.5%) African American, 1 (0.3%) Native American, 7 (1.9%) Asian, 2 (0.5%) Pacific Islander, 4 (1.1%) from other races, and 26 (7.1%) from two or more races. Hispanic or Latino of any race were 19 persons (5.2%).

The whole population lived in households. There were 182 households, out of which 40 (22.0%) had children under the age of 18 living in them, 113 (62.1%) were married-couple households, 11 (6.0%) were cohabiting couple households, 34 (18.7%) had a female householder with no partner present, and 24 (13.2%) had a male householder with no partner present. 40 households (22.0%) were one person, and 23 (12.6%) were one person aged 65 or older. The average household size was 2.01. There were 133 families (73.1% of all households).

The age distribution was 41 people (11.2%) under the age of 18, 23 people (6.3%) aged 18 to 24, 65 people (17.8%) aged 25 to 44, 96 people (26.2%) aged 45 to 64, and 141 people (38.5%) who were 65 years of age or older. The median age was 57.3 years. For every 100 females, there were 116.6 males.

There were 597 housing units at an average density of 196.6 units per square mile (75.9 units/km^{2}), of which 182 (30.5%) were occupied. Of these, 141 (77.5%) were owner-occupied, and 41 (22.5%) were occupied by renters.

=== 2010 ===
The 2010 United States census reported that Lake Almanor Peninsula had a population of 356. The population density was 117.3 inhabitants per square mile (45.3/km^{2}). The racial makeup of Lake Almanor Peninsula was 337 (94.7%) White, 0 (0.0%) African American, 9 (2.5%) Native American, 0 (0.0%) Asian, 0 (0.0%) Pacific Islander, 4 (1.1%) from other races, and 6 (1.7%) from two or more races. Hispanic or Latino of any race were 22 persons (6.2%).

The Census reported that 356 people (100% of the population) lived in households, 0 (0%) lived in non-institutionalized group quarters, and 0 (0%) were institutionalized.

There were 165 households, out of which 32 (19.4%) had children under the age of 18 living in them, 95 (57.6%) were opposite-sex married couples living together, 10 (6.1%) had a female householder with no husband present, 5 (3.0%) had a male householder with no wife present. There were 6 (3.6%) unmarried opposite-sex partnerships, and 0 (0%) same-sex married couples or partnerships. 47 households (28.5%) were made up of individuals, and 18 (10.9%) had someone living alone who was 65 years of age or older. The average household size was 2.16. There were 110 families (66.7% of all households); the average family size was 2.57.

The population was spread out, with 67 people (18.8%) under the age of 18, 15 people (4.2%) aged 18 to 24, 60 people (16.9%) aged 25 to 44, 130 people (36.5%) aged 45 to 64, and 84 people (23.6%) who were 65 years of age or older. The median age was 54.3 years. For every 100 females, there were 110.7 males. For every 100 females age 18 and over, there were 103.5 males.

There were 561 housing units at an average density of 184.8 per square mile (71.4/km^{2}), of which 128 (77.6%) were owner-occupied, and 37 (22.4%) were occupied by renters. The homeowner vacancy rate was 16.3%; the rental vacancy rate was 48.6%. 264 people (74.2% of the population) lived in owner-occupied housing units and 92 people (25.8%) lived in rental housing units.

== Politics ==
In the state legislature, Lake Almanor Peninsula is in the 1st senatorial district, represented by Republican Megan Dahle, and the 1st Assembly district, represented by Republican Heather Hadwick.

Federally, Lake Almanor Peninsula is in California's 3rd congressional district, represented by Independent Kevin Kiley.

== Education ==
The school district is Plumas Unified School District.
