= Buntingville, California =

Unincorporated community in California, United States

Buntingville
- Unincorporated community
- Location in California Buntingville (the United States)
- Coordinates: 40°17′09″N 120°29′06″W
- Country: United States
- State: California
- County: Lassen
- Elevation: 4,091 ft (1,247 m)

Buntingville is an unincorporated community in Lassen County, California, United States. It is located 8.5 miles (14 km) southwest of Litchfield, at an elevation of 4091 feet (1247 m). It is located just northwest of Honey Lake.

Buntingville is the southern terminus of County Route A3 (Standish Buntingville Road) at its junction with U.S. 395.

Alexander J. Bunting opened a general store at the site in 1878 at the intersection of Alturas and Reno Stage Road. The general store became an accommodation for travelers. The settlement was just south of Janesville and during the boom time in the late 1870s and early 1880s, there was a small rivalry. In 1900, the short-lived Buntingville Breeze was published for two months. On July 10, 1911, Honey Lake Valley's first telephone company headquarters opened. However, financial difficulties resulted in the telephone company to be taken over by Lassen Telephone Company. A post office operated in Buntingville from 1883 to 1884, from 1899 to 1907, and from 1915 to 1920.
