= Calpine, California =

Calpine
- census-designated place
- Location of Calpine in Sierra County, California.

- Location within the state of California
- Coordinates: 39°39′59″N 120°26′23″W
- Country: United States
- State: California
- County: Sierra

Area
  - Total: 0.71 sq mi (1.84 km^{2})
  - Land: 0.71 sq mi (1.84 km^{2})
  - Water: 0.0039 sq mi (0.01 km^{2}) 0.31%
- Elevation: 4,935 ft (1,504 m)

Population (2020)
  - Total: 223
  - Density: 314.1/sq mi (121.29/km^{2})
- Time zone: UTC-8 (Pacific (PST))
  - Summer (DST): UTC-7 (PDT)
- FIPS code: 06-10004
- GNIS feature ID: 2582957

Calpine is a census-designated place in Sierra County, California, United States. Calpine sits at an elevation of 5,689 feet (1,734 m). The 2020 United States census reported Calpine's population was 223.

== Geography ==
According to the United States Census Bureau, the CDP covers an area of 0.7 square mile (1.8 km^{2}), of which 99.69% is land and 0.31% is water.

== History ==
The town was founded to support the Davies-Johnson Lumber Mill circa 1919. From 1921 until 1940, a branch of the Western Pacific Railroad served the town and the mill, working out of Portola. The timber stocks were gone by 1939 and the mill closed soon after.

The name could be an abbreviation of the surname McAlpine.

== Demographics ==
Historical population
Census	Pop.	Note	%±
2010	205		—
2020	223		8.8%
U.S. Decennial Census; 1850–1870 1880-1890; 1900 1910 1920; 1930 1940 1950; 1960 1970 1980; 1990 2000 2010

Calpine first appeared as a census designated place in the 2010 U.S. census.

=== Racial and ethnic composition ===
Calpine CDP, California – Racial and ethnic composition Note: the US Census treats Hispanic/Latino as an ethnic category. This table excludes Latinos from the racial categories and assigns them to a separate category. Hispanics/Latinos may be of any race.
Race / Ethnicity (NH = Non-Hispanic)	Pop 2010	Pop 2020	% 2010	% 2020
White alone (NH)	170	198	82.93%	88.79%
Black or African American alone (NH)	0	0	0.00%	0.00%
Native American or Alaska Native alone (NH)	0	0	0.00%	0.00%
Asian alone (NH)	0	0	0.00%	0.00%
Native Hawaiian or Pacific Islander alone (NH)	1	0	0.49%	0.00%
Other race alone (NH)	0	1	0.00%	0.45%
Mixed race or Multiracial (NH)	8	6	3.90%	2.69%
Hispanic or Latino (any race)	26	18	12.68%	8.07%
Total	205	223	100.00%	100.00%

=== 2020 census ===
As of the 2020 census, Calpine had a population of 223. The population density was 314.1 inhabitants per square mile (121.3/km^{2}). The median age was 50.8 years. The age distribution was 40 people (17.9%) under the age of 18, 4 people (1.8%) aged 18 to 24, 44 people (19.7%) aged 25 to 44, 72 people (32.3%) aged 45 to 64, and 63 people (28.3%) who were 65 years of age or older. For every 100 females, there were 110.4 males, and for every 100 females age 18 and over, there were 101.1 males age 18 and over.

0.0% of residents lived in urban areas, while 100.0% lived in rural areas.

The whole population lived in households. There were 112 households, of which 26.8% had children under the age of 18 living in them. Of all households, 50.9% were married-couple households, 6.3% were cohabiting couple households, 17.9% had a female householder with no partner present, and 25.0% had a male householder with no partner present. 28.6% of all households were made up of individuals, and 12 (10.7%) were one person aged 65 or older. The average household size was 1.99. There were 67 families (59.8% of all households).

There were 164 housing units at an average density of 231.0 units per square mile (89.2 units/km^{2}), of which 112 (68.3%) were occupied. Of these, 84 (75.0%) were owner-occupied, and 28 (25.0%) were occupied by renters. The homeowner vacancy rate was 0.0% and the rental vacancy rate was 9.7%.

Racial composition as of the 2020 census
Race	Number	Percent
White	200	89.7%
Black or African American	0	0.0%
American Indian and Alaska Native	0	0.0%
Asian	0	0.0%
Native Hawaiian and Other Pacific Islander	0	0.0%
Some other race	2	0.9%
Two or more races	21	9.4%

== Politics ==
In the state legislature, Calpine is in the 1st senatorial district, represented by Republican Megan Dahle, and the 1st Assembly district, represented by Republican Heather Hadwick.

Federally, Calpine is in California's 3rd congressional district, represented by Independent Kevin Kiley.
