= Crescent Mills, California =

Crescent Mills
- Unincorporated Community; Census Designated Place
- Location in Plumas County and the state of California

- Location in the United States
- Coordinates: 40°5′47″N 120°54′46″W
- Country: United States
- State: California
- County: Plumas

Area
  - Total: 4.24 sq mi (10.99 km^{2})
  - Land: 4.24 sq mi (10.99 km^{2})
  - Water: 0 sq mi (0.00 km^{2}) 0%
- Elevation: 3,527 ft (1,075 m)

Population (2020)
  - Total: 206
  - Density: 48.6/sq mi (18.75/km^{2})
- Time zone: UTC-8 (Pacific (PST))
  - Summer (DST): UTC-7 (PDT)
- ZIP code: 95934
- Area code: 530
- FIPS code: 06-17050
- GNIS feature IDs: 1655937; 2407679

Crescent Mills (formerly, Crescent City and Crescent) is a census-designated place (CDP) in Plumas County, California, United States. Crescent Mills is located 3.5 miles (5.6 km) southeast of Greenville. The population was 206 at the 2020 census, up from 196 at the 2010 census.

== History ==
In 1821 Mary A Zubea was born. Four years later Frank Joseph Stampfli was born. When these two became adults they married. Frank Joseph Stampfli was born in Switzerland and immigrated to the United States. He then registered to pioneer out West where the Stampfli family settled in what is known today as Crescent Mills, CA and Indian Valley.

In 1867 Mary A Stampfli died and was buried on the Stampfli Ranch creating the family cemetery. A tall headstone marked Mary A. Stampfli 1821-1867 was placed above her grave. Lewis Stampfli followed in 1869 and Frank joined his wife in the family cemetery in 1892.

The local Native Americans of the Maui do and the Stampfli family had made relationships. Relationships between the Maui do and the Stampfli's included local organizations such as the Indian Mission and marriage. Stampfli's also married with the Peck family.

In 1915 Albert Riehl came to Plumas County and settled in Indian Valley. After meeting Vivian Stampfli they were married and took up residence in Crescent Mills. Albert went on to own the local slaughter house on the North end of town and a butcher shop 4 doors south of the current Gigis Market. The second generation of Stampfli's and Peck's continued to branch out with other families that had settled within the area as well. In the early 1930s Pearl Peck moved away from the Stampfli Ranch and moved to San Francisco where she met and married David "Bud" Strong, an owner of a large nursery garden. They had two boys, David Strong Jr. and younger brother Deryl Glen Strong. Within a year after Deryl was born Pearl became home sick and asked her family to move back to Crescent Mills where Bud Strong Purchased the Stampfli Ranch.

The Stampfli Ranch covered the west side of Main Street up the mountainside then out to the east into a large flat valley named Indian Valley. The corner of Stampfli Lane and Main Street marks the middle of the Ranch.

Crescent Mills post office opened in 1870.

== Geography ==
Crescent Mills is located at 40°5′47″N 120°54′46″W (40.096329, -120.912872).

According to the United States Census Bureau, the CDP has a total area of 4.2 square miles (11 km^{2}), all land.

== Demographics ==
Historical population
Census	Pop.	Note	%±
2000	258		—
2010	196		−24.0%
2020	206		5.1%
U.S. Decennial Census; 1860–1870 1880-1890; 1900 1910 1920; 1930 1940 1950; 1960 1970 1980; 1990 2000 2010

Crescent Mills first appeared as a census designated place in the 2000 U.S. census.

=== 2020 ===
Crescent Mills CDP, California – Racial and ethnic composition Note: the US Census treats Hispanic/Latino as an ethnic category. This table excludes Latinos from the racial categories and assigns them to a separate category. Hispanics/Latinos may be of any race.
Race / Ethnicity (NH = Non-Hispanic)	Pop 2000	Pop 2010	Pop 2020	% 2000	% 2010	% 2020
White alone (NH)	210	156	154	81.40%	79.59%	74.76%
Black or African American alone (NH)	0	1	0	0.00%	0.51%	0.00%
Native American or Alaska Native alone (NH)	12	10	12	4.65%	5.10%	5.83%
Asian alone (NH)	0	0	0	0.00%	0.00%	0.00%
Native Hawaiian or Pacific Islander alone (NH)	0	0	0	0.00%	0.00%	0.00%
Other race alone (NH)	0	0	2	0.00%	0.00%	0.97%
Mixed race or Multiracial (NH)	6	3	16	2.33%	1.53%	7.77%
Hispanic or Latino (any race)	30	26	22	11.63%	13.27%	10.68%
Total	258	196	206	100.00%	100.00%	100.00%

=== 2010 ===
At the 2010 census Crescent Mills had a population of 196. The population density was 46.2 inhabitants per square mile (17.8/km^{2}). The racial makeup of Crescent Mills was 172 (87.8%) White, 1 (0.5%) African American, 15 (7.7%) Native American, 0 (0.0%) Asian, 0 (0.0%) Pacific Islander, 0 (0.0%) from other races, and 8 (4.1%) from two or more races. Hispanic or Latino of any race were 26 people (13.3%).

The whole population lived in households, no one lived in non-institutionalized group quarters and no one was institutionalized.

There were 93 households, 21 (22.6%) had children under the age of 18 living in them, 43 (46.2%) were opposite-sex married couples living together, 7 (7.5%) had a female householder with no husband present, 4 (4.3%) had a male householder with no wife present. There were 5 (5.4%) unmarried opposite-sex partnerships, and 2 (2.2%) same-sex married couples or partnerships. 35 households (37.6%) were one person and 11 (11.8%) had someone living alone who was 65 or older. The average household size was 2.11. There were 54 families (58.1% of households); the average family size was 2.65.

The age distribution was 37 people (18.9%) under the age of 18, 7 people (3.6%) aged 18 to 24, 32 people (16.3%) aged 25 to 44, 78 people (39.8%) aged 45 to 64, and 42 people (21.4%) who were 65 or older. The median age was 52.6 years. For every 100 females, there were 90.3 males. For every 100 females age 18 and over, there were 89.3 males.

There were 115 housing units at an average density of 27.1 per square mile, of the occupied units 64 (68.8%) were owner-occupied and 29 (31.2%) were rented. The homeowner vacancy rate was 5.9%; the rental vacancy rate was 9.1%. 140 people (71.4% of the population) lived in owner-occupied housing units and 56 people (28.6%) lived in rental housing units.

=== 2000 ===
At the 2000 census there were 258 people, 98 households, and 73 families in the CDP. The population density was 60.8 inhabitants per square mile (23.5/km^{2}). There were 114 housing units at an average density of 26.9 per square mile (10.4/km^{2}). The racial makeup of the CDP was 84.88% White, 6.20% Native American, 3.49% from other races, and 5.43% from two or more races. 11.63% of the population were Hispanic or Latino of any race. Of the 98 households 37.8% had children under the age of 18 living with them, 54.1% were married couples living together, 18.4% had a female householder with no husband present, and 25.5% were non-families. 25.5% of households were one person and 10.2% were one person aged 65 or older. The average household size was 2.63 and the average family size was 3.14.

The age distribution was 29.1% under the age of 18, 6.6% from 18 to 24, 23.6% from 25 to 44, 27.5% from 45 to 64, and 13.2% 65 or older. The median age was 40 years. For every 100 females, there were 92.5 males. For every 100 females age 18 and over, there were 94.7 males.

The median household income was $30,268 and the median family income was $30,357. Males had a median income of $26,591 versus $33,125 for females. The per capita income for the CDP was $16,640. About 14.5% of families and 10.8% of the population were below the poverty line, including 20.9% of those under the age of eighteen and none of those sixty five or over.

== Politics ==
In the state legislature, Crescent Mills is in the 1st senatorial district, represented by Republican Megan Dahle, and the 1st Assembly district, represented by Republican Heather Hadwick.

Federally, Crescent Mills is in California's 3rd congressional district, represented by Independent Kevin Kiley.

== Education ==
The school district is Plumas Unified School District.
