= Little Shasta Church =

- Location within California
- 41°42′39.9″N 122°23′23.1″W
- Location: Little Shasta, California
- Country: United States

History
- Former name: Little Shasta Congregational Church
- Founded: 1875
- Founder: Roswell Graves

Architecture
- Groundbreaking: 1878

Little Shasta Church is a church located in Little Shasta, California.

== History ==
In 1875, after a series of meetings, Reverend Roswell Graves organized the church, then known as Little Shasta Congregational Church, which was built in 1878.
