= California State Route 151 =

Highway in California

State Route 151
- Shasta Dam Boulevard
- SR 151 highlighted in red

Route information
- Maintained by Caltrans
- Length: 6.925 mi (11.145 km)
- Tourist routes: Shasta Dam Boulevard between Lake Boulevard and CR A18

Major junctions
- West end: Shasta Dam Visitors Center (State Maintenance)
- CR A18 in Shasta Lake
- East end: I-5 in Shasta Lake

Location
- Country: United States
- State: California
- Counties: Shasta

Highway system
- State highways in California; Interstate; US; State; Scenic; History; Pre‑1964; Unconstructed; Deleted; Freeways
← SR 150	→ SR 152

State Route 151 (SR 151) is a state highway in the U.S. state of California. The route runs along Shasta Dam Boulevard in Shasta County from Shasta Dam to Interstate 5 near Shasta Lake City.

== Route description ==
Route 151 is defined in section 451 of the California Streets and Highways Code, and that the highway is "from Shasta Dam to Route 5 near the City of Shasta Lake".

SR 151 begins at Shasta Dam, where the Sacramento River is dammed to form Shasta Lake. State maintenance specifically begins at the visitor center located south of the dam (the segment of Shasta Dam Boulevard that runs directly to and across the top of the dam is closed to the general public). From there, the road heads south as Shasta Dam Boulevard, crossing through heavily vegetated area. The road then meets CR A18 within the city of Shasta Lake. Heading eastward, the road enters the center of Shasta Lake before meeting its eastern terminus at Interstate 5.

SR 151 is not part of the National Highway System, a network of highways that are considered essential to the country's economy, defense, and mobility by the Federal Highway Administration. SR 151 is eligible for the State Scenic Highway System, and from Shasta Dam to Lake Boulevard is officially designated as a scenic highway by the California Department of Transportation, meaning that it is a substantial section of highway passing through a "memorable landscape" with no "visual intrusions", where the potential designation has gained popular favor with the community.

== Major intersections ==
Except where prefixed with a letter, postmiles were measured on the road as it was in 1964, based on the alignment that existed at the time, and do not necessarily reflect current mileage. Postmile prefixes include: R reflecting a realignment in the route since then, M indicating a second realignment, L referring to an overlap due to a correction or change, and T indicating postmiles classified as temporary. Segments that remain unconstructed or have been relinquished to local control may be omitted. The entire route is in Shasta County.

Location	Postmile	Destinations	Notes
	0.00	Shasta Dam Visitors Center	West end of SR 151/state maintenance; road continues to a roundabout with CR A18 (Lake Boulevard), Shasta Dam Access Road, and Shasta Dam Boulevard north (closed to all but dam personnel)
Shasta Lake	3.78	CR A18 (Lake Boulevard)	
Shasta Lake	6.79	Cascade Boulevard	
Shasta Lake	R6.92	I-5 – Redding, Portland	Interchange; east end of SR 151; I-5 exit 685
1.000 mi = 1.609 km; 1.000 km = 0.621 mi
