= Valley Ranch, California =

Valley Ranch
- Unincorporated Community; Census Designated Place
- Location in Plumas County and the state of California

- Location in the United States
- Coordinates: 39°44′18″N 120°34′4″W
- Country: United States
- State: California
- County: Plumas

Area
  - Total: 1.137 sq mi (2.945 km^{2})
  - Land: 1.137 sq mi (2.945 km^{2})
  - Water: 0 sq mi (0 km^{2}) 0%
- Elevation: 4,436 ft (1,352 m)

Population (2020)
  - Total: 128
  - Density: 113/sq mi (43.5/km^{2})
- Time zone: UTC-8 (Pacific (PST))
  - Summer (DST): UTC-7 (PDT)
- ZIP code: 96106
- Area code: 530
- FIPS code: 06-81869
- GNIS feature ID: 1853419

Valley Ranch is a census-designated place in Plumas County, California, United States. The population was 128 at the 2020 census, up from 109 at the 2010 census.

== Geography ==
Valley Ranch is located at 39°44′18″N 120°34′4″W (39.738392, -120.567839).

According to the United States Census Bureau, the CDP has a total area of 1.1 square miles (2.9 km^{2}), all land.

== Demographics ==
Historical population
Census	Pop.	Note	%±
2000	92		—
2010	109		18.5%
2020	128		17.4%
U.S. Decennial Census; 1860–1870 1880-1890; 1900 1910 1920; 1930 1940 1950; 1960 1970 1980; 1990 2000 2010

Valley Ranch first appeared as a census designated place in the 2000 U.S. census.

=== 2020 ===
Valley Ranch CDP, California – Racial and ethnic composition Note: the US Census treats Hispanic/Latino as an ethnic category. This table excludes Latinos from the racial categories and assigns them to a separate category. Hispanics/Latinos may be of any race.
Race / Ethnicity (NH = Non-Hispanic)	Pop 2000	Pop 2010	Pop 2020	% 2000	% 2010	% 2020
White alone (NH)	90	106	123	97.83%	97.25%	96.09%
Black or African American alone (NH)	0	0	0	0.00%	0.00%	0.00%
Native American or Alaska Native alone (NH)	0	0	2	0.00%	0.00%	1.56%
Asian alone (NH)	0	0	2	0.00%	0.00%	1.56%
Native Hawaiian or Pacific Islander alone (NH)	0	0	0	0.00%	0.00%	0.00%
Other race alone (NH)	0	0	0	0.00%	0.00%	0.00%
Mixed race or Multiracial (NH)	0	1	1	0.00%	0.92%	0.78%
Hispanic or Latino (any race)	2	2	0	2.17%	1.83%	0.00%
Total	92	109	128	100.00%	100.00%	100.00%

The 2020 United States census reported that Valley Ranch had a population of 128. The population density was 112.6 inhabitants per square mile (43.5/km^{2}). The racial makeup of Valley Ranch was 123 (96.1%) White, 2 (1.6%) Native American, 2 (1.6%) Asian, and 1 (0.8%) from two or more races. No residents were Hispanic or Latino.

The whole population lived in households. There were 66 households, out of which 11 (16.7%) had children under the age of 18 living in them, 38 (57.6%) were married-couple households, 3 (4.5%) were cohabiting couple households, 11 (16.7%) had a female householder with no partner present, and 14 (21.2%) had a male householder with no partner present. 20 households (30.3%) were one person, and 12 (18.2%) were one person aged 65 or older. The average household size was 1.94. There were 44 families (66.7% of all households).

The age distribution was 8 people (6.2%) under the age of 18, 1 people (0.8%) aged 18 to 24, 25 people (19.5%) aged 25 to 44, 26 people (20.3%) aged 45 to 64, and 68 people (53.1%) who were 65 years of age or older. The median age was 65.5 years. There were 62 males and 66 females.

There were 81 housing units at an average density of 71.2 units per square mile (27.5 units/km^{2}), of which 66 (81.5%) were occupied. Of these, 59 (89.4%) were owner-occupied, and 7 (10.6%) were occupied by renters.

== Media ==
The primary local news source is the Portola Reporter, a newspaper published every Wednesday.

== Politics ==
In the state legislature, Valley Ranch is in the 1st senatorial district, represented by Republican Megan Dahle, and the 1st Assembly district, represented by Republican Heather Hadwick.

Federally, Valley Ranch is in California's 3rd congressional district, represented by Independent Kevin Kiley.

== Education ==
The school district is Plumas Unified School District.
