= Grenada, California =

Census-designated place (CDP) in Siskiyou County, California, United States

Grenada
- Unincorporated Community; Census Designated Place
- A scene in Grenada

- Location of Grenada in Siskiyou County, California

- Location within the state of California
- Coordinates: 41°38′40″N 122°31′22″W
- Country: United States of America
- State: California
- County: Siskiyou

Area
  - Total: 0.517 sq mi (1.339 km^{2})
  - Land: 0.516 sq mi (1.336 km^{2})
  - Water: 0.0012 sq mi (0.003 km^{2}) 0.23%
- Elevation: 2,579 ft (786 m)

Population (2020)
  - Total: 314
  - Density: 609/sq mi (235/km^{2})
- ZIP code: 96038
- Area code: 530
- FIPS code: 06-31246

Grenada (/ɡrɪˈneɪdə/ grin-AY-də) is a census-designated place (CDP) in Siskiyou County, California, United States. Its population is 314 as of the 2020 census, down from 367 from the 2010 census. The ZIP code is 96038 and the community is within area code 530.

== Geography ==
Grenada is located at 41°38′40″N 122°31′22″W (41.644438, -122.522768).

According to the United States Census Bureau, the CDP has a total area of 0.5 square miles (1.3 km^{2}), of which 99.77% is land and 0.23% is water.

== Demographics ==
Historical population
Census	Pop.	Note	%±
2000	361		—
2010	367		1.7%
2020	314		−14.4%
U.S. Decennial Census; 1860–1870 1880-1890; 1900 1910 1920; 1930 1940 1950; 1960 1970 1980; 1990 2000 2010

Grenada first appeared as a census designated place in the 2000 U.S. census.

=== 2020 ===
The 2020 United States census reported that Grenada had a population of 314. The population density was 608.5 inhabitants per square mile (234.9/km^{2}). The racial makeup of Grenada was 248 (79.0%) White, 5 (1.6%) African American, 10 (3.2%) Native American, 4 (1.3%) Asian, 0 (0.0%) Pacific Islander, 9 (2.9%) from other races, and 38 (12.1%) from two or more races. Hispanic or Latino of any race were 24 persons (7.6%).

The census reported that 94.3% of the population lived in households and 5.7% were institutionalized.

There were 117 households, out of which 31 (26.5%) had children under the age of 18 living in them, 55 (47.0%) were married-couple households, 12 (10.3%) were cohabiting couple households, 24 (20.5%) had a female householder with no partner present, and 26 (22.2%) had a male householder with no partner present. 28 households (23.9%) were one person, and 16 (13.7%) were one person aged 65 or older. The average household size was 2.53. There were 77 families (65.8% of all households).

The age distribution was 60 people (19.1%) under the age of 18, 26 people (8.3%) aged 18 to 24, 61 people (19.4%) aged 25 to 44, 70 people (22.3%) aged 45 to 64, and 97 people (30.9%) who were 65 years of age or older. The median age was 48.8 years. For every 100 females, there were 112.2 males.

There were 122 housing units at an average density of 236.4 units per square mile (91.3 units/km^{2}), of which 117 (95.9%) were occupied. Of these, 73 (62.4%) were owner-occupied, and 44 (37.6%) were occupied by renters.

=== 2010 ===
The 2010 United States census reported that Grenada had a population of 367. The population density was 709.9 inhabitants per square mile (274.1/km^{2}). The racial makeup of Grenada was 307 (83.7%) White, 2 (0.5%) African American, 35 (9.5%) Native American, 1 (0.3%) Asian, 0 (0.0%) Pacific Islander, 3 (0.8%) from other races, and 19 (5.2%) from two or more races. Hispanic or Latino of any race were 12 persons (3.3%).

The Census reported that 367 people (100% of the population) lived in households, 0 (0%) lived in non-institutionalized group quarters, and 0 (0%) were institutionalized.

There were 162 households, out of which 40 (24.7%) had children under the age of 18 living in them, 60 (37.0%) were opposite-sex married couples living together, 19 (11.7%) had a female householder with no husband present, 7 (4.3%) had a male householder with no wife present. There were 9 (5.6%) unmarried opposite-sex partnerships, and 1 (0.6%) same-sex married couples or partnerships. 58 households (35.8%) were made up of individuals, and 36 (22.2%) had someone living alone who was 65 years of age or older. The average household size was 2.27. There were 86 families (53.1% of all households); the average family size was 3.06.

The population was spread out, with 81 people (22.1%) under the age of 18, 20 people (5.4%) aged 18 to 24, 85 people (23.2%) aged 25 to 44, 86 people (23.4%) aged 45 to 64, and 95 people (25.9%) who were 65 years of age or older. The median age was 44.5 years. For every 100 females, there were 92.1 males. For every 100 females age 18 and over, there were 91.9 males.

There were 193 housing units at an average density of 373.3 per square mile (144.1/km^{2}), of which 80 (49.4%) were owner-occupied, and 82 (50.6%) were occupied by renters. The homeowner vacancy rate was 2.4%; the rental vacancy rate was 23.4%. 218 people (59.4% of the population) lived in owner-occupied housing units and 149 people (40.6%) lived in rental housing units.

== Politics ==
In the state legislature, Grenada is in the 1st senatorial district, represented by Republican Megan Dahle, and the 1st Assembly district, represented by Republican Heather Hadwick.

Federally, Grenada is in California's 1st congressional district, represented by Republican James Gallagher.
