= Hamilton Branch, California =

Hamilton Branch
- Unincorporated Community; Census Designated Place
- Location in Plumas County and the state of California

- Location in the United States
- Coordinates: 40°16′26″N 121°5′45″W
- Country: United States
- State: California
- County: Plumas

Area
  - Total: 1.085 sq mi (2.811 km^{2})
  - Land: 1.085 sq mi (2.811 km^{2})
  - Water: 0 sq mi (0 km^{2}) 0%
- Elevation: 4,630 ft (1,410 m)

Population (2020)
  - Total: 505
  - Density: 465/sq mi (180/km^{2})
- Time zone: UTC-8 (Pacific (PST))
  - Summer (DST): UTC-7 (PDT)
- ZIP code: 96137
- Area code: 530
- FIPS code: 06-31883
- GNIS feature ID: 1666181

Hamilton Branch is a census-designated place (CDP) in Plumas County, California, United States. The population was 505 at the 2020 census.

== Geography ==
Hamilton Branch is located at 40°16′26″N 121°5′45″W (40.274001, -121.095899), on the north-eastern shore of Lake Almanor.

According to the United States Census Bureau, the town has a total area of 1.1 square miles (2.8 km^{2}), all land.

== Demographics ==
Historical population
Census	Pop.	Note	%±
2000	587		—
2010	537		−8.5%
2020	505		−6.0%
U.S. Decennial Census; 1860–1870 1880-1890; 1900 1910 1920; 1930 1940 1950; 1960 1970 1980; 1990 2000 2010

Hamilton Branch first appeared as a census designated place in the 2000 U.S. census.

=== 2020 ===
Hamilton Branch CDP, California – Racial and ethnic composition Note: the US Census treats Hispanic/Latino as an ethnic category. This table excludes Latinos from the racial categories and assigns them to a separate category. Hispanics/Latinos may be of any race.
Race / Ethnicity (NH = Non-Hispanic)	Pop 2000	Pop 2010	Pop 2020	% 2000	% 2010	% 2020
White alone (NH)	552	499	436	94.04%	92.92%	86.34%
Black or African American alone (NH)	0	2	2	0.00%	0.37%	0.40%
Native American or Alaska Native alone (NH)	1	0	4	0.17%	0.00%	0.79%
Asian alone (NH)	1	3	1	0.17%	0.56%	0.20%
Native Hawaiian or Pacific Islander alone (NH)	0	0	0	0.00%	0.00%	0.00%
Other race alone (NH)	0	0	3	0.00%	0.00%	0.59%
Mixed race or Multiracial (NH)	5	13	23	0.85%	2.42%	4.55%
Hispanic or Latino (any race)	28	20	36	4.77%	3.72%	7.13%
Total	587	537	505	100.00%	100.00%	100.00%

The 2020 United States census reported that Hamilton Branch had a population of 505. The population density was 465.4 inhabitants per square mile (179.7/km^{2}). The racial makeup of Hamilton Branch was 442 (87.5%) White, 2 (0.4%) African American, 4 (0.8%) Native American, 1 (0.2%) Asian, 0 (0.0%) Pacific Islander, 5 (1.0%) from other races, and 51 (10.1%) from two or more races. Hispanic or Latino of any race were 36 persons (7.1%).

The whole population lived in households. There were 241 households, out of which 26 (10.8%) had children under the age of 18 living in them, 125 (51.9%) were married-couple households, 8 (3.3%) were cohabiting couple households, 42 (17.4%) had a female householder with no partner present, and 66 (27.4%) had a male householder with no partner present. 91 households (37.8%) were one person, and 48 (19.9%) were one person aged 65 or older. The average household size was 2.10. There were 139 families (57.7% of all households).

The age distribution was 80 people (15.8%) under the age of 18, 15 people (3.0%) aged 18 to 24, 70 people (13.9%) aged 25 to 44, 184 people (36.4%) aged 45 to 64, and 156 people (30.9%) who were 65 years of age or older. The median age was 57.1 years. For every 100 females, there were 117.7 males.

There were 442 housing units at an average density of 407.4 units per square mile (157.3 units/km^{2}), of which 241 (54.5%) were occupied. Of these, 213 (88.4%) were owner-occupied, and 28 (11.6%) were occupied by renters.

=== 2010 ===
At the 2010 census Hamilton Branch had a population of 537. The population density was 494.7 inhabitants per square mile (191.0/km^{2}). The racial makeup of Hamilton Branch was 514 (95.7%) White, 2 (0.4%) African American, 0 (0.0%) Native American, 3 (0.6%) Asian, 0 (0.0%) Pacific Islander, 3 (0.6%) from other races, and 15 (2.8%) from two or more races. Hispanic or Latino of any race were 20 people (3.7%).

The whole population lived in households, no one lived in non-institutionalized group quarters and no one was institutionalized.

There were 234 households, 50 (21.4%) had children under the age of 18 living in them, 146 (62.4%) were opposite-sex married couples living together, 7 (3.0%) had a female householder with no husband present, 9 (3.8%) had a male householder with no wife present. There were 15 (6.4%) unmarried opposite-sex partnerships, and 2 (0.9%) same-sex married couples or partnerships. 58 households (24.8%) were one person and 27 (11.5%) had someone living alone who was 65 or older. The average household size was 2.29. There were 162 families (69.2% of households); the average family size was 2.72.

The age distribution was 105 people (19.6%) under the age of 18, 27 people (5.0%) aged 18 to 24, 78 people (14.5%) aged 25 to 44, 187 people (34.8%) aged 45 to 64, and 140 people (26.1%) who were 65 or older. The median age was 52.3 years. For every 100 females, there were 106.5 males. For every 100 females age 18 and over, there were 101.9 males.

There were 434 housing units at an average density of 399.9 per square mile, of the occupied units 201 (85.9%) were owner-occupied and 33 (14.1%) were rented. The homeowner vacancy rate was 2.9%; the rental vacancy rate was 19.5%. 446 people (83.1% of the population) lived in owner-occupied housing units and 91 people (16.9%) lived in rental housing units.

== Politics ==
In the state legislature, Hamilton Branch is in the 1st senatorial district, represented by Republican Megan Dahle, and the 1st Assembly district, represented by Republican Heather Hadwick.

Federally, Hamilton Branch is in California's 3rd congressional district, represented by Independent Kevin Kiley.

== Education ==
The school district is Plumas Unified School District.
