= Little Shasta, California =

Unincorporated community in California, United States

Coordinates: 41°42′43″N 122°23′29″W

Little Shasta is an unincorporated community in Siskiyou County, California, United States. The first non-native permanent settlement in the area was made in 1853, and by 1881 Little Shasta was a "prosperous settlement" with a post office, a flour mill, two schoolhouses, two stores, and a church. As of 2024, the church and a school remained at the townsite, along with several scattered residences.

== See also ==
Little Shasta Church - A church in the town
