= Johnsville, California =

Johnsville
- Unincorporated Community; Census Designated Place
- Location in Plumas County and the state of California

- Location in the United States
- Coordinates: 39°46′46″N 120°41′38″W
- Country: United States
- State: California
- County: Plumas

Area
  - Total: 13.812 sq mi (35.773 km^{2})
  - Land: 13.760 sq mi (35.638 km^{2})
  - Water: 0.052 sq mi (0.135 km^{2}) 0.38%
- Elevation: 5,180 ft (1,579 m)

Population (2020)
  - Total: 22
  - Density: 1.6/sq mi (0.6/km^{2})
- Time zone: UTC-8 (Pacific (PST))
  - Summer (DST): UTC-7 (PDT)
- ZIP code: 96103
- Area code: 530
- FIPS code: 06-37512
- GNIS feature ID: 1658869

Johnsville is a census-designated place (CDP) in Plumas County, California, United States. The population was 22 at the 2020 census.

== Geography ==
Johnsville is located at 39°46′46″N 120°41′38″W (39.779359, -120.693855).

According to the United States Census Bureau, the CDP has a total area of 13.8 square miles (36 km^{2}), of which 13.8 square miles (36 km^{2}) is land and 0.1 square miles (0.26 km^{2}) (0.38%) is water.

== Demographics ==
Historical population
Census	Pop.	Note	%±
2000	21		—
2010	20		−4.8%
2020	22		10.0%
U.S. Decennial Census; 1860–1870 1880-1890; 1900 1910 1920; 1930 1940 1950; 1960 1970 1980; 1990 2000 2010

Johnsville first appeared as a census designated place in the 2000 U.S. census.

=== 2020 ===
Johnsville CDP, California – Racial and ethnic composition Note: the US Census treats Hispanic/Latino as an ethnic category. This table excludes Latinos from the racial categories and assigns them to a separate category. Hispanics/Latinos may be of any race.
Race / Ethnicity (NH = Non-Hispanic)	Pop 2000	Pop 2010	Pop 2020	% 2000	% 2010	% 2020
White alone (NH)	17	20	18	80.95%	100.00%	81.82%
Black or African American alone (NH)	0	0	0	0.00%	0.00%	0.00%
Native American or Alaska Native alone (NH)	0	0	0	0.00%	0.00%	0.00%
Asian alone (NH)	1	0	1	4.76%	0.00%	4.55%
Native Hawaiian or Pacific Islander alone (NH)	0	0	0	0.00%	0.00%	0.00%
Other race alone (NH)	0	0	1	0.00%	0.00%	4.55%
Mixed race or Multiracial (NH)	0	0	0	0.00%	0.00%	0.00%
Hispanic or Latino (any race)	3	0	2	14.29%	0.00%	9.09%
Total	21	20	22	100.00%	100.00%	100.00%

The 2020 United States census reported that Johnsville had a population of 22. Of the residents, 18 were White, 1 was Asian, 1 was from some other race, and 2 were from two or more races. There were 2 Hispanic or Latino residents (from any race).

There were 10 households, of which 6 were families and 2 were one person living alone. The median age was 60.5 years.

There were 72 housing units, of which 10 were occupied year round, all by homeowners, and 61 were used seasonally.

== Politics ==
In the state legislature, Johnsville is in the 1st senatorial district, represented by Republican Megan Dahle, and the 1st Assembly district, represented by Republican Heather Hadwick.

Federally, Johnsville is in California's 3rd congressional district, represented by Independent Kevin Kiley.

== Education ==
The school district is Plumas Unified School District.

== Notable people ==
- George Quellich, baseball player
- Maria Cuneo, Johnsville resident who, after being accused of flirting at a local dance by her husband, vowed to never leave her house out of loyalty. 50 years later following her husband's death, Mary took her first steps outside of her yard in 1930. Her story was shown in Ripley's Believe it or Not.
