= Rosewood, Tehama County, California =

Unincorporated community in California, United States

Coordinates: 40.28°N 122.55°W

Rosewood is an unincorporated community in Tehama County, California, United States. Rosewood is situated along State Route 36 at the junction with County Route A5 (Bowman Road) to Cottonwood.

Rosewood had its start when a country store opened at the site. The store was built and operated by Joe and Elizabeth Durrer. The Durrer ranch was named Rosewood because of all of the wild roses growing on the property. Rosewood begin as a stage stop on State Route 36 to the coast. The store supplied many miners in the area living on Begum Peak. The store remain opened until the death of Joe and Elizabeth Durrer in the 1930s. They are both buried on the Rosewood property. A post office was established at Rosewood in 1898, and remained in operation until 1909.
