= Patton Village, California =

West Patton Village
- census-designated place
- Location in California
- Coordinates: 40°08′28″N 120°09′18″W
- Country: United States
- State: California
- County: Lassen

Area
  - Total: 3.491 sq mi (9.041 km^{2})
  - Land: 3.491 sq mi (9.041 km^{2})
  - Water: 0 sq mi (0 km^{2}) 0%
- Elevation: 4,111 ft (1,253 m)

Population (2020)
  - Total: 632
  - Density: 181/sq mi (69.9/km^{2})
- Time zone: UTC-8 (Pacific (PST))
  - Summer (DST): UTC-7 (PDT)
- ZIP Code: 96113
- GNIS feature IDs: 1666224; 2583109

Patton Village is a census-designated place in Lassen County, California, United States. It lies at an elevation of 4111 feet (1253 m). Its population is 632 as of the 2020 census, down from 702 from the 2010 census.

== Geography ==
According to the United States Census Bureau, the CDP has a total area of 3.5 square miles (9.0 km^{2}), all of which is land.

== Demographics ==
Historical population
Census	Pop.	Note	%±
2010	702		—
2020	632		−10.0%
U.S. Decennial Census; 2010

Patton Village first appeared as a census designated place in the 2010 U.S. census.

The 2020 United States census reported that Patton Village had a population of 632. The population density was 181.0 inhabitants per square mile (69.9/km^{2}). The racial makeup of Patton Village was 497 (78.6%) White, 26 (4.1%) African American, 11 (1.7%) Native American, 6 (0.9%) Asian, 1 (0.2%) Pacific Islander, 24 (3.8%) from other races, and 67 (10.6%) from two or more races. Hispanic or Latino of any race were 79 persons (12.5%).

The whole population lived in households. There were 252 households, out of which 53 (21.0%) had children under the age of 18 living in them, 102 (40.5%) were married-couple households, 18 (7.1%) were cohabiting couple households, 62 (24.6%) had a female householder with no partner present, and 70 (27.8%) had a male householder with no partner present. 81 households (32.1%) were one person, and 46 (18.3%) were one person aged 65 or older. The average household size was 2.51. There were 156 families (61.9% of all households).

The age distribution was 143 people (22.6%) under the age of 18, 38 people (6.0%) aged 18 to 24, 173 people (27.4%) aged 25 to 44, 162 people (25.6%) aged 45 to 64, and 116 people (18.4%) who were 65 years of age or older. The median age was 40.2 years. For every 100 females, there were 115.7 males.

There were 317 housing units at an average density of 90.8 units per square mile (35.1 units/km^{2}), of which 252 (79.5%) were occupied. Of these, 161 (63.9%) were owner-occupied, and 91 (36.1%) were occupied by renters.

== Politics ==
In the state legislature, Patton Village is in the 1st senatorial district, represented by Republican Megan Dahle, and the 1st Assembly district, represented by Republican Heather Hadwick.

Federally, Patton Village is in California's 1st congressional district, represented by Republican James Gallagher.
