= Standish Hall (Standish, California) =

United States national historic site

- U.S. National Register of Historic Places
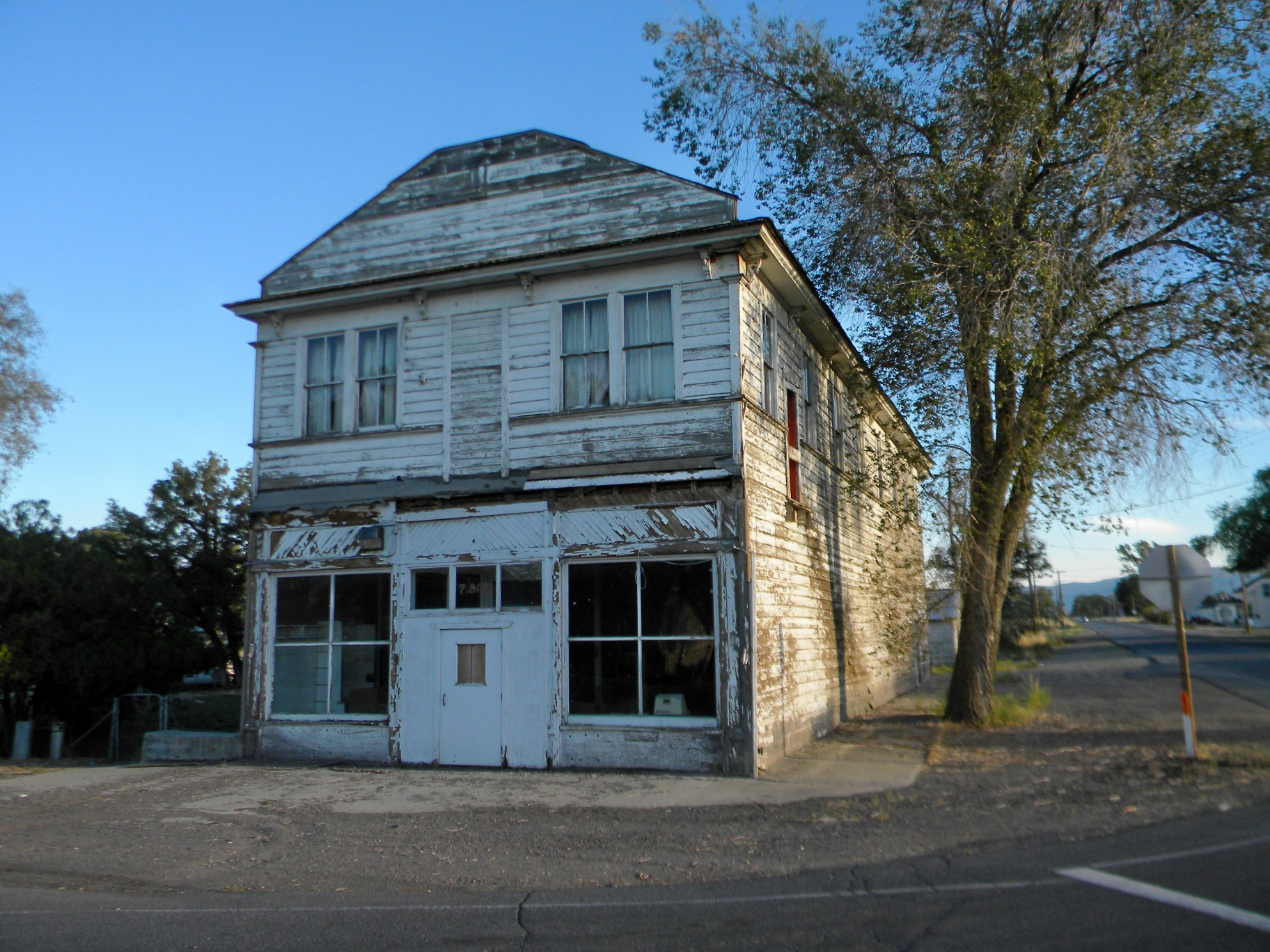

- Location within California
- Location: 718-820 US 395 E, Standish, California
- Coordinates: 40°21′54″N 120°25′17″W
- Area: 0.8 acres (0.32 ha)
- Built: 1907
- Built by: Wilbur Brothers
- NRHP reference No.: 05000596
- Added to NRHP: June 17, 2005

Standish Hall, at 718-820 US 395 E. in Standish, California, was built in 1907. It was listed on the National Register of Historic Places in 2005.

Its first floor was a store and the second floor served as a meeting hall serving, at different times, the Lassen Lodge #421 I.O.O.F. (Odd Fellows), Nataqua Parlor #152, Native Daughters of the Golden West, Lassen County Sheriff's Posse and the Standish #220 Foresters of America. It also served for 4H meetings, Future Farmers of America, and for dance lessons and fundraisers.
