= Standish, California =

Unincorporated community in California, United States

Standish
- Unincorporated community
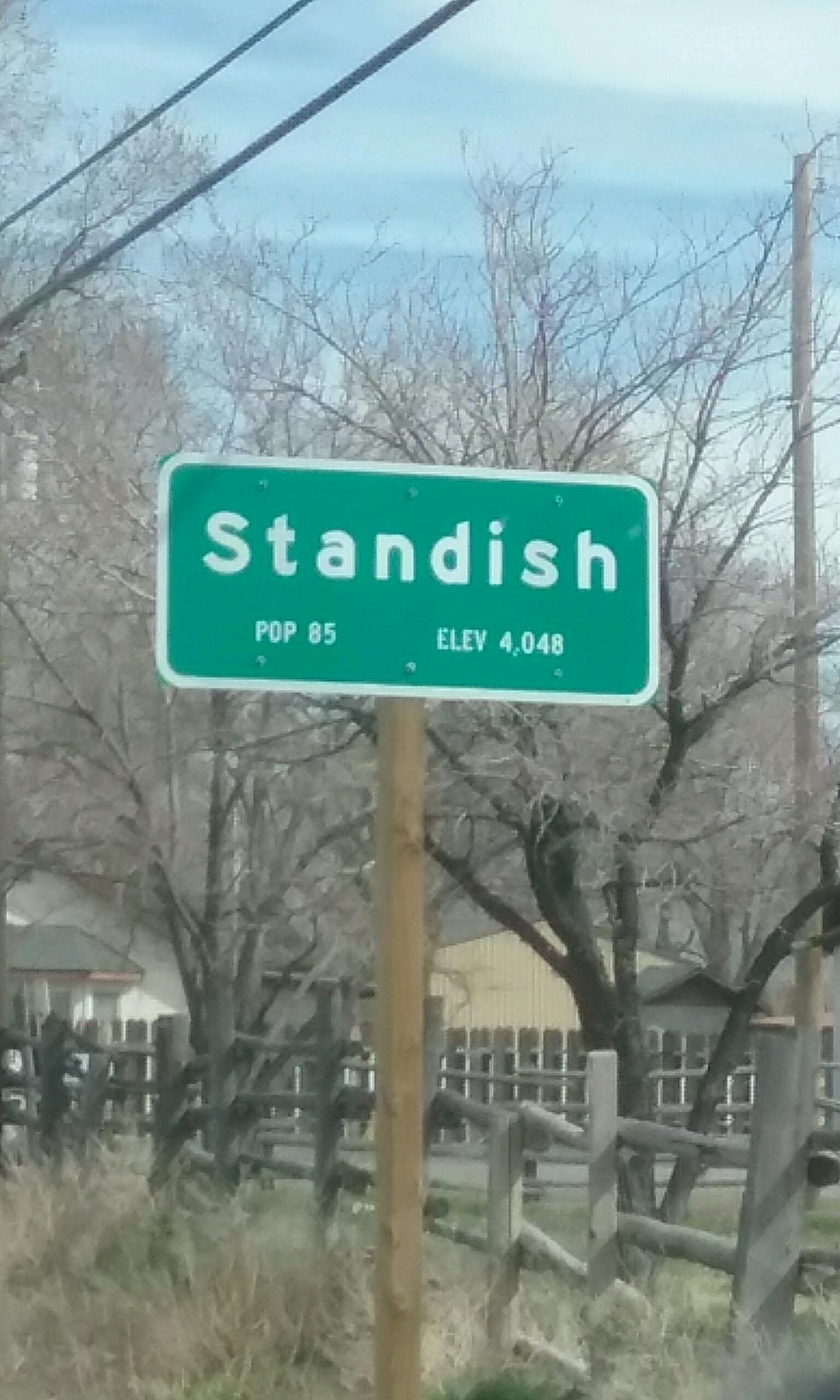
- Standish sign

- Location in California Standish (the United States)
- Coordinates: 40°21′55″N 120°25′20″W
- Country: United States
- State: California
- County: Lassen
- Elevation: 4,049 ft (1,234 m)
- ZIP code: 96128
- Area code: 530

Standish is an unincorporated town in Lassen County, California, United States. It is located 2.25 miles (3.6 km) southwest of Litchfield, at an elevation of 4,049 feet (1,234 m). It lies at the northern terminus of County Route A3 (Standish Buntingville Road) on U.S. Route 395. The name honors Miles Standish.

== History ==
Standish was laid out in 1897, as the second development of the Associated Colonies of New York, whose job was to "create utopian communities in the West". As a part of this project, Standish was designed based on the beliefs of Myles Standish, and the economic structure was designed based on the ideas promoted by LDS leader Brigham Young. The design of the town was supposed to model European communities which had the majority of residents leaving the village during the day in order to work in the nearby fields. When the town was built, it was expected that most of the residents would be farmers with houses separated by at least one hundred feet. In autumn 1897, the Associated Colonies purchased the properties of Edward T. Purser and his Susan River Irrigation system. Afterwards, the Associated Colonies recruited local people to form the Honey Lake Valley Colonial Club, which would go on to design the Standish Colony. A 240-acre (0.97 km^{2}) site was chosen to build the town on February 5, 1898. It was on February 18, 1898, that the Colonial Irrigation Company of the Honey Lake Valley was incorporated in order to irrigate water for the crops. However, legal problems with the system and water rights caused delay in its operation and the development of Standish; after several legal battles, the courts placed restraints on their irrigation rights. On January 14, 1905, the courts finally ordered the auction of the Colonial Irrigation Company. The post office opened in 1899, having been transferred from Datura.

== Points of interest ==
- Standish School
  - On January 5, 1906, the school district was created. However, its existence was relatively brief; on July 1, 1951, the school district was consolidated with the Bridgeport, Soldier Bridge school district to form the Shaffer Union School District. The school was then closed.
- Standish Hall is a registered historic place.

== Climate ==
This region experiences warm (but not hot) and dry summers, with no average monthly temperatures above 71.6 °F (22 °C). According to the Köppen Climate Classification system, Standish has a warm-summer Mediterranean climate, abbreviated "Csb" on climate maps.

== See also ==
- W. E. Smythe, founder of the town
