= Litchfield, California =

Litchfield
- census-designated place
- Location of Litchfield in Lassen County, California

- Location in California
- Coordinates: 40°22′58″N 120°23′14″W
- Country: United States
- State: California
- County: Lassen

Area
  - Total: 3.982 sq mi (10.313 km^{2})
  - Land: 3.982 sq mi (10.313 km^{2})
  - Water: 0 sq mi (0 km^{2}) 0%
- Elevation: 4,065 ft (1,239 m)

Population (2020)
  - Total: 160
  - Density: 40/sq mi (16/km^{2})
- Time zone: UTC-8 (Pacific (PST))
  - Summer (DST): UTC-7 (PDT)
- GNIS feature IDs: 252725; 2628751

Litchfield is a census-designated place in Lassen County, California, United States. It is located 15 miles (24 km) east of Susanville, at an elevation of 4,065 feet (1,239 m). Its population is 160 as of the 2020 census, down from 195 from the 2010 census.

== History ==
The first post office at Litchfield opened in 1914, and moved in 1941. The name honors pioneer Thomas Litch.

The United States Bureau of Land Management maintains a wild horse and burro corral near Litchfield. The hay barn at the facility was set on fire by members of the Earth Liberation Front on October 15, 2001.

== Geography ==
According to the United States Census Bureau, the CDP has a total area of 4.0 square miles (10 km^{2}), all land.

=== Climate ===
This region experiences warm (but not hot) and dry summers, with no average monthly temperatures above 71.6 °F (22 °C). According to the Köppen Climate Classification system, Litchfield has a warm-summer Mediterranean climate, abbreviated "Csb" on climate maps.

== Demographics ==
Historical population
Census	Pop.	Note	%±
2010	195		—
2020	160		−17.9%
U.S. Decennial Census; 1850–1870 1880-1890; 1900 1910 1920; 1930 1940 1950; 1960 1970 1980; 1990 2000 2010

Litchfield first appeared as a census designated place in the 2010 U.S. census.

The 2020 United States census reported that Litchfield had a population of 160. The population density was 40.2 inhabitants per square mile (15.5/km^{2}). The racial makeup of Litchfield was 146 (91.3%) White, 3 (1.9%) Asian, and 11 (6.9%) from two or more races. Hispanic or Latino of any race were 5 persons (3.1%).

The whole population lived in households. There were 66 households, out of which 23 (34.8%) had children under the age of 18 living in them, 29 (43.9%) were married-couple households, 1 (1.5%) were cohabiting couple households, 11 (16.7%) had a female householder with no partner present, and 25 (37.9%) had a male householder with no partner present. 19 households (28.8%) were one person, and 8 (12.1%) were one person aged 65 or older. The average household size was 2.42. There were 46 families (69.7% of all households).

The age distribution was 36 people (22.5%) under the age of 18, 12 people (7.5%) aged 18 to 24, 27 people (16.9%) aged 25 to 44, 44 people (27.5%) aged 45 to 64, and 41 people (25.6%) who were 65 years of age or older. The median age was 49.0 years. There were 71 males and 89 females.

There were 75 housing units at an average density of 18.8 units per square mile (7.3 units/km^{2}), of which 66 (88.0%) were occupied. Of these, 50 (75.8%) were owner-occupied, and 16 (24.2%) were occupied by renters.

== Politics ==
In the state legislature, Litchfield is in the 1st senatorial district, represented by Republican Megan Dahle, and the 1st Assembly district, represented by Republican Heather Hadwick.

Federally, Litchfield is in California's 1st congressional district, represented by Republican James Gallagher.
