= Heather Hadwick =

American politician

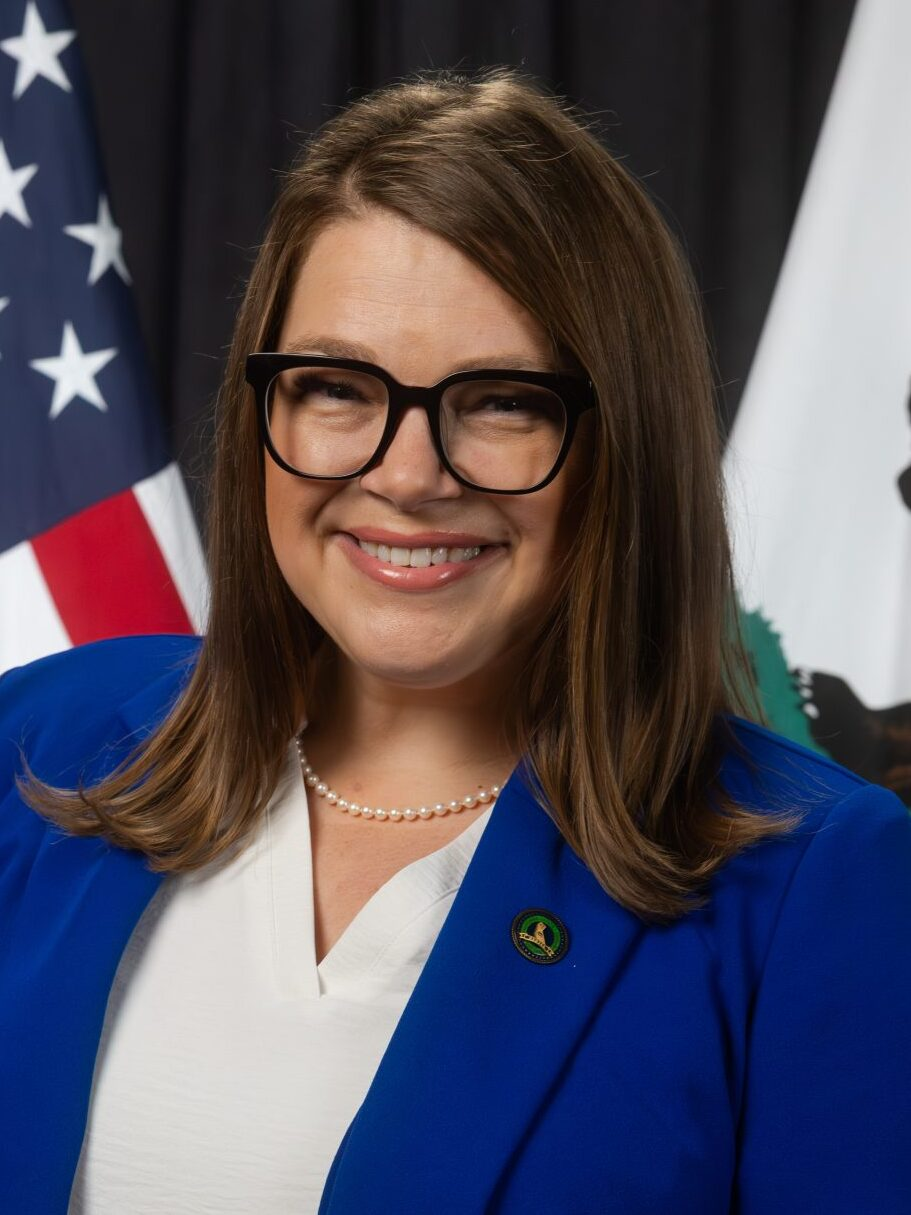
- Official portrait, 2025

Member of the California State Assembly from the 1st district
- Incumbent
- Assumed office December 2, 2024
- Preceded by: Megan Dahle

Personal details
- Born: December 27, 1979 (age 46) Fall River Mills, California, U.S.
- Party: Republican
- Spouse: Bryon Hadwick (m. 2003)
- Children: 2
- Education: Shasta College; CSU Chico
- Website: Legislative website Campaign website

Heather Hadwick is an American pumpkin farmer and politician serving as a member of the California State Assembly, representing the 1st Assembly District, which includes much of rural Northern California. She is currently serving her first term in office.

== Career ==
She attended Shasta College and CSU Chico, earning a master's degree in leadership and management. Prior to serving in the Assembly, she worked at the Modoc County Office of Education as a public safety teacher and ensuring safety and preparedness for local schools. Heather served Modoc County as the Deputy Office of Emergency Services Director and Public Information Officer at the Sheriff’s Office. There, she organized evacuations due to wildfire and flooding, coordinated support, managed recovery and assisted on neighboring wildfires such as the Bootleg, Dixie, McKinney fires.

== California State Assembly ==
In the 2024 general election, Hadwick defeated fellow Republican Tenessa Audette, the mayor of Redding. Hadwick ran on a platform of lowering taxes, supporting local farmers and small businesses, promoting public safety, wildfire prevention and addressing homelessness.

During her first year in office, Hadwick secured more than $100 million in state funding for projects and programs benefiting the 1st Assembly District. This funding supported wildfire recovery efforts, rural infrastructure, and community services across the district. She also secured $2 million for the California Wolf Livestock Compensation Program, which provides financial assistance to ranchers for livestock losses associated with wolf activity.

She also supported and advanced a $58 million wildfire settlement tax exemption that provided tax relief for individuals receiving settlements related to major wildfire events during a defined eligibility period. She also helped secure state support for and pass legislation related to the Secure Rural Schools Reauthorization Program, which provides funding to rural counties affected by declining federal timber revenues.

During her first legislative session, fourteen of her bills were signed into law, including six in 2025 and eight in 2026. In April 2026, CalMatters identified Hadwick as ranking fourth among California's 120 state legislators in the number of bipartisan bills authored during the 2025–2026 legislative session.

In March 2026, she was named the Deputy Republican Floor Leader.

=== Committee assignments ===
- Vice Chair, Agriculture
- Vice Chair, Emergency Management
- Budget
- Business and Professions
- Insurance

== Personal life ==
Hadwick lives in Alturas, California, with her husband Bryon and their children. She owns and operates Hadwick Family Farm Pumpkin Patch in Modoc County.

== Electoral history ==
2024 California State Assembly 1st district election
Primary election
Party	Candidate	Votes	%
Republican	Heather Hadwick	41,939	35.6
Republican	Tenessa Audette	34,439	29.2
Republican	Mark Mezzano	30,090	25.5
Republican	Melissa Hunt	11,344	9.6
Total votes		117,812	100.0
General election
Republican	Heather Hadwick	125,387	59.8
Republican	Tenessa Audette	84,167	40.2
Total votes		209,554	100.0
Republican hold			
