= Fredonyer Peak =

California Modoc-Lassen mountain

- Location within California

Highest point
- Elevation: 2,452 m (8,045 ft)
- Prominence: 739 m (2,425 ft)
- Coordinates: 40°41′16″N 120°35′55″W

Geography
- Location: Lassen County, California, US
- Parent range: Modoc-Lassen Plateau
- Topo map: USGS Fredonyer Peak

Fredonyer Peak is a mountain located in the Modoc-Lassen Plateau of central Lassen County, California. It is around 16.2 km (10.1 mi) east by north of Spaulding, California.

Standing at 2,452 m (8,045 ft), it is the highest point in the Modoc-Lassen Plateau.

Atop the mountain, there is an old fire lookout tower and a radio mast, accessible via dirt road.
