= Hot Springs Peak (California) =

Mountain in California, United States

- Location within California

Highest point
- Elevation: 2,333 m (7,654 ft)
- Prominence: 882 m (2,894 ft)
- Coordinates: 40°22′30.08″N 120°7′17.51″W

Geography
- Location: Lassen County, California, U.S.
- Parent range: Skedaddle Mountains
- Topo map: USGS Bull Flat

Hot Springs Peak, also known as Skedaddle Mountain, is a mountain located in the Skedaddle Mountains of southeast Lassen County, California. It is around 10 km (6.2 mi) east-northeast of Wendel, California.

Standing at 2,333 m (7,654 ft.), it is the highest point in the Skedaddle Mountains.

Many mountains in the area (including Hot Springs Peak) were burned over during the Rush Fire in 2012, which at the time was the largest fire to ever take place in Lassen County.

== See also ==
- Skedaddle Mountains
