= Shaffer Mountain (California) =

Mountain in California, United States

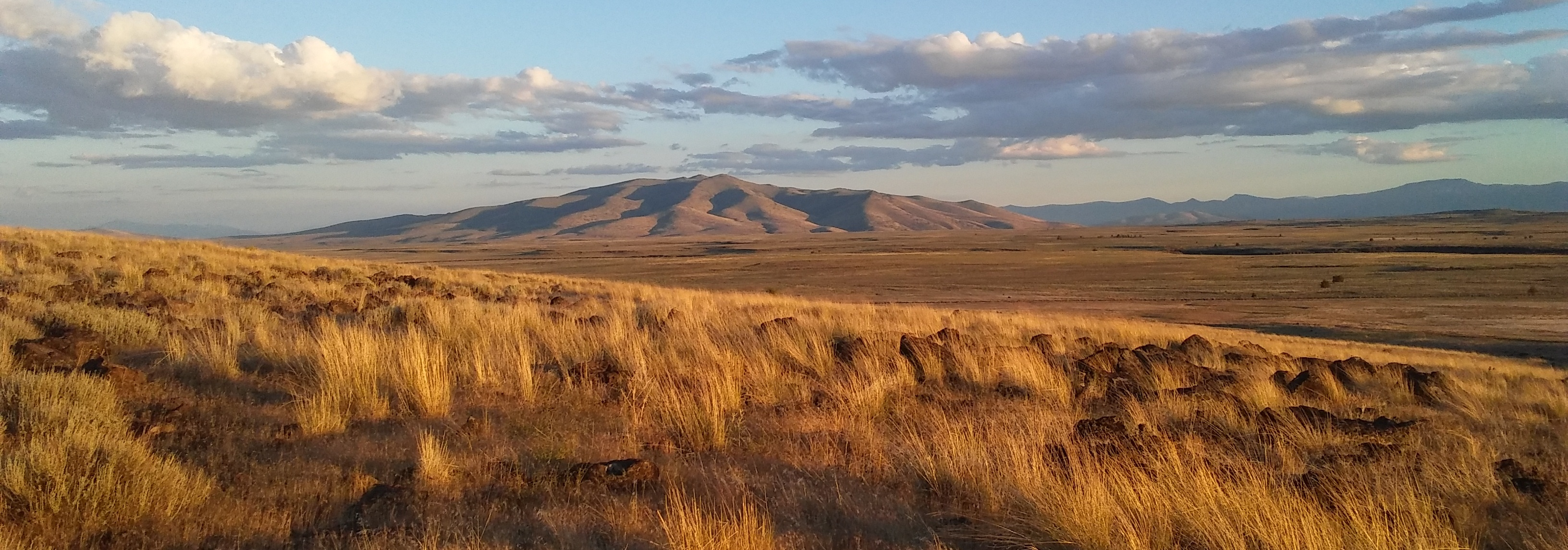

Highest point
- Elevation: 2,054 m (6,739 ft)
- Prominence: 663 m (2,175 ft)
- Coordinates: 40°26′48.64″N 120°21′25.8″W

Geography
- Location within California
- Location: Lassen County, California, U.S.
- Parent range: Skedaddle Mountains
- Topo map: USGS Shaffer Mountain

Shaffer Mountain is a mountain located in the Skedaddle Mountains of southeast Lassen County, California. It is around 7.6 km (4.7 mi) north-northeast of Litchfield, California. The mountain stands at 2,054 m (6,739 ft.) tall.

Atop the mountain, there are multiple cell towers accessible via dirt road.

== See also ==
- Skedaddle Mountains
