= Little Valley =

Little Valley may refer to:

- Little Valley, California
- Little Valley Township, McPherson County, Kansas
- Little Valley, New York
  - Little Valley (town), New York
  - Little Valley (village), New York
