= Clear Creek, Lassen County, California =

Clear Creek
- census-designated place
- Location in California
- Coordinates: 40°17′53″N 121°02′55″W
- Country: United States
- State: California
- County: Lassen

Area
  - Total: 1.141 sq mi (2.954 km^{2})
  - Land: 1.133 sq mi (2.934 km^{2})
  - Water: 0.0077 sq mi (0.020 km^{2}) 0.52%
- Elevation: 4,970 ft (1,515 m)

Population (2020)
  - Total: 175
  - Density: 154/sq mi (59.6/km^{2})
- Time zone: UTC-8 (Pacific (PST))
  - Summer (DST): UTC-7 (PDT)
- GNIS feature IDs: 1658289; 2611428

Clear Creek is a census-designated place (CDP) in Lassen County, California, United States. It is located 2.5 miles (4 km) west-southwest of Westwood, at an elevation of 4970 feet (1515 m). Its population is 175 as of the 2020 census, up from 169 from the 2010 census.

== Geography ==
According to the United States Census Bureau, the CDP has a total area of 1.1 square miles (2.9 km^{2}), of which over 99% is land.

== Demographics ==
Historical population
Census	Pop.	Note	%±
2010	169		—
2020	175		3.6%
U.S. Decennial Census; 1850–1870 1880-1890; 1900 1910 1920; 1930 1940 1950; 1960 1970 1980; 1990 2000 2010

Clear Creek first appeared as a census designated place in the 2010 U.S. census.

The 2020 United States census reported that Clear Creek had a population of 175. The population density was 154.5 inhabitants per square mile (59.7/km^{2}). The racial makeup of Clear Creek was 160 (91.4%) White, 0 (0.0%) African American, 0 (0.0%) Native American, 1 (0.6%) Asian, 0 (0.0%) Pacific Islander, 0 (0.0%) from other races, and 14 (8.0%) from two or more races. Hispanic or Latino of any race were 9 persons (5.1%).

The whole population lived in households. There were 77 households, out of which 24 (31.2%) had children under the age of 18 living in them, 30 (39.0%) were married-couple households, 5 (6.5%) were cohabiting couple households, 23 (29.9%) had a female householder with no partner present, and 19 (24.7%) had a male householder with no partner present. 31 households (40.3%) were one person, and 12 (15.6%) were one person aged 65 or older. The average household size was 2.27. There were 41 families (53.2% of all households).

The age distribution was 27 people (15.4%) under the age of 18, 13 people (7.4%) aged 18 to 24, 31 people (17.7%) aged 25 to 44, 59 people (33.7%) aged 45 to 64, and 45 people (25.7%) who were 65 years of age or older. The median age was 55.4 years. There were 85 males and 90 females.

There were 156 housing units at an average density of 137.7 units per square mile (53.2 units/km^{2}), of which 77 (49.4%) were occupied. Of these, 65 (84.4%) were owner-occupied, and 12 (15.6%) were occupied by renters.

== Politics ==
In the state legislature, Clear Creek is in the 1st senatorial district, represented by Republican Megan Dahle, and the 1st Assembly district, represented by Republican Heather Hadwick.

Federally, Clear Creek is in California's 1st congressional district, represented by Republican James Gallagher.
