= Milford, California =

Milford
- census-designated place
- Location in Lassen County and the state of California

- Location in the United States
- Coordinates: 40°10′17″N 120°22′21″W
- Country: United States
- State: California
- County: Lassen

Area
  - Total: 5.297 sq mi (13.720 km^{2})
  - Land: 5.292 sq mi (13.706 km^{2})
  - Water: 0.0058 sq mi (0.015 km^{2}) 0.11%
- Elevation: 4,222 ft (1,287 m)

Population (2020)
  - Total: 147
  - Density: 27.8/sq mi (10.7/km^{2})
- Time zone: UTC-8 (Pacific (PST))
  - Summer (DST): UTC-7 (PDT)
- GNIS feature IDs: 1659126; 2628757

Milford is a census-designated place in Lassen County, California, United States. It is located on Mill Creek, 15 miles (24 km) south of Litchfield, at an elevation of 4222 feet (1287 m). Its population is 147 as of the 2020 census, down from 167 from the 2010 census.

The settlement began when Judson Dakin and J.C. Wemple opened a mill at the site in 1861. The first post office at Milford opened in 1864 and closed for a period during 1879.

On August 22, 2021, the Dixie fire approached Milford but fire crews were able to protect the structures.

== Geography ==
According to the United States Census Bureau, the CDP has a total area of 5.3 square miles (13.7 km^{2}), of which over 99% is land.

== Demographics ==
Historical population
Census	Pop.	Note	%±
2010	167		—
2020	147		−12.0%
U.S. Decennial Census; 1850–1870 1880-1890; 1900 1910 1920; 1930 1940 1950; 1960 1970 1980; 1990 2000 2010

Milford first appeared as a census-designated place in the 2010 U.S. census.

The 2020 United States census reported that Milford had a population of 147. The population density was 27.8 inhabitants per square mile (10.7/km^{2}). The racial makeup of Milford was 120 (81.6%) White, 1 (0.7%) African American, 4 (2.7%) Native American, 4 (2.7%) Asian, 0 (0.0%) Pacific Islander, 6 (4.1%) from other races, and 12 (8.2%) from two or more races. Hispanic or Latino of any race were 3 persons (2.0%).

The whole population lived in households. There were 66 households, out of which 16 (24.2%) had children under the age of 18 living in them, 41 (62.1%) were married-couple households, 4 (6.1%) were cohabiting couple households, 11 (16.7%) had a female householder with no partner present, and 10 (15.2%) had a male householder with no partner present. 15 households (22.7%) were one person, and 4 (6.1%) were one person aged 65 or older. The average household size was 2.23. There were 48 families (72.7% of all households).

The age distribution was 25 people (17.0%) under the age of 18, 5 people (3.4%) aged 18 to 24, 20 people (13.6%) aged 25 to 44, 56 people (38.1%) aged 45 to 64, and 41 people (27.9%) who were 65 years of age or older. The median age was 53.5 years. There were 74 males and 73 females.

There were 71 housing units at an average density of 13.4 units per square mile (5.2 units/km^{2}), of which 66 (93.0%) were occupied. Of these, 57 (86.4%) were owner-occupied, and 9 (13.6%) were occupied by renters.

== Politics ==
In the state legislature, Milford is in the 1st senatorial district, represented by Republican Megan Dahle, and the 1st Assembly district, represented by Republican Heather Hadwick.

Federally, Milford is in California's 1st congressional district, represented by Republican James Gallagher.
