= Whaleback Fire =

2018 wildfire in Northern California

- Part of the 2018 California wildfires
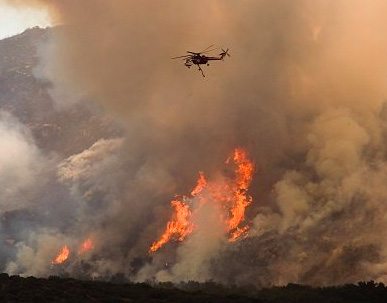
- Date: July 27, 2018 –; August 7, 2018
- Location: Spaulding, California, United States
- Coordinates: 40.63°N 120.883°W

Statistics
- Burned area: 18,703 acres (76 km^{2})

Impacts
- Structures destroyed: None

Map
- Location of fire in California

Location of Whaleback Fire

The Whaleback Fire was a wildfire that burned on Whaleback Mountain in Spaulding, approximately 20 miles northwest of Susanville in Lassen County, California, in the United States. First reported on July 27, 2018, the Whaleback Fire burned 18,703 acres (76 km^{2}), before it was fully contained on August 7. The fire caused evacuations in the community of Spaulding and led to closures of portions of Lassen National Forest.

== Progression ==
The Whaleback Fire was reported on July 27, 2018 around 1:30 p.m. PDT, on Whaleback Mountain, on the west side of Eagle Lake, in the community of Spaulding, in Lassen County, California. Mandatory evacuations were put in place for Spaulding on July 28. By July 30, the fire had grown significantly, to over 14,000 acres (57 km^{2}) with 20 percent containment. Select country roads were closed and five campgrounds, Gallatin Marina and Beach, and the Camp Ronald McDonald were evacuated and closed. Helicopters began using Eagle Lake for dipping water. The Assembly of God Church in Susanville was opened as an evacuation center. A request for a mobile retardant base was put in by the US Forest Service to Canada, as no bases are available in the US. Fire crews focused on building containment lines, using bulldozers, retardant and back-firing. Construction began on a containment line north of the fire to protect Buck's Bay and Stones Landing. As of the evening of July 31, the Whaleback Fire had burned 16,850 acres (68 km^{2}) and was 32 percent contained.

As the fire continued to burn into August, it had grown over 1,400 acres (6 km^{2}) and was 40 percent contained. The growth was due to unburned fuels burning out in the middle of the fire. The fire met the edge of Eagle Lake as it grew. By the morning of August 2, the Whaleback Fire had burned 18,703 acres (76 km^{2}) and was 55 percent contained. On August 7, the Whaleback Fire was fully contained.

== Effects ==
The Whaleback Fire has impacted the community of Spaulding and recreational activities in Lassen National Forest.

=== Evacuations ===
On August 2, the following mandatory evacuations were in effect:

- Spaulding
- Gallatin Marina
- Camp Ronald McDonald
- Merrill, Christie, Eagle and Aspen campgrounds

== Fire growth and containment progress ==
Fire containment status Gray: contained; Red: active; %: percent contained;
Date	Area burned acres (km^{2})	Containment
Jul 30	14,098 (57)	
Aug 1	18,342 (74)	
Aug 2	18,703 (76)	
Aug 3–6	---	---
Aug 7	18,703 (76)	
