= Stones Landing, California =

Unincorporated community in California, United States

- Unincorporated community Census-designated place
- Location in California Stones Landing, California (the United States)
- Coordinates: 40°41′30″N 120°44′05″W
- Country: United States
- State: California
- County: Lassen

Area
  - Total: 2.121 sq mi (5.49 km^{2})
  - Land: 2.121 sq mi (5.49 km^{2})
  - Water: 0 sq mi (0 km^{2})
- Elevation: 5,118 ft (1,560 m)

Population (2020)
  - Total: 86
  - Density: 41/sq mi (16/km^{2})
- Time zone: UTC-8 (Pacific)
  - Summer (DST): UTC-7 (PDT)
- GNIS feature ID: 2805901

Stones Landing is an unincorporated community and census-designated place (CDP) in Lassen County, California, United States. It lies at an elevation of 5,118 feet (1560 m). Its population was 86 as of the 2020 census.

== Demographics ==
Historical population
Census	Pop.	Note	%±
2020	86		—
U.S. Decennial Census; 1850–1870 1880-1890; 1900 1910 1920; 1930 1940 1950; 1960 1970 1980; 1990 2000 2010; 2020

Stones Landing first appeared as a census designated place in the 2020 U.S. census.

=== 2020 Census ===
Stones Landing CDP, California – Racial and ethnic composition Note: the US Census treats Hispanic/Latino as an ethnic category. This table excludes Latinos from the racial categories and assigns them to a separate category. Hispanics/Latinos may be of any race.
Race / Ethnicity (NH = Non-Hispanic)	Pop 2020	% 2020
White alone (NH)	73	84.88%
Black or African American alone (NH)	1	1.16%
Native American or Alaska Native alone (NH)	1	1.16%
Asian alone (NH)	0	0.00%
Pacific Islander alone (NH)	1	1.16%
Other race alone (NH)	0	0.00%
Mixed race or Multiracial (NH)	6	6.98%
Hispanic or Latino (any race)	4	4.65%
Total	86	100.00%
