= Nubieber, California =

Nubieber
- census-designated place
- Location in California
- Coordinates: 41°05′45″N 121°10′59″W
- Country: United States
- State: California
- County: Lassen

Area
  - Total: 0.757 sq mi (1.961 km^{2})
  - Land: 0.749 sq mi (1.940 km^{2})
  - Water: 0.0081 sq mi (0.021 km^{2}) 1.06%
- Elevation: 4,121 ft (1,256 m)

Population (2020)
  - Total: 19
  - Density: 25/sq mi (9.8/km^{2})
- Time zone: UTC-8 (Pacific (PST))
  - Summer (DST): UTC-7 (PDT)
- GNIS feature IDs: 253179; 2628767

Nubieber (formerly, Big Valley City and New Town) is a census-designated place in Lassen County, California, United States. It is located at the common terminus of the Western Pacific Railroad and the Great Northern Railway Bieber Line, 3 miles (4.8 km) southwest of Bieber, at an elevation of 4121 feet (1256 m). Its population is 19 as of the 2020 census, down from 50 from the 2010 census.

== History ==
The settlement was established in 1931, when the railroads were built to the place. The first post office opened the same year. The name was a version of "New Bieber". The first person born in the settlement was Shirley Patrica Warren, daughter of Rex and Beulah Warren.

== Geography ==
According to the United States Census Bureau, the CDP has a total area of 0.8 square mile (2.0 km^{2}), of which 99% is land.

== Demographics ==
Historical population
| Census | Pop. | Note | %± |
|---|---|---|---|
| 2010 | 19 | | — |
| 2020 | 19 | | 0.0% |
U.S. Decennial Census; 1850–1870 1880-1890; 1900 1910 1920; 1930 1940 1950; 1960 1970 1980; 1990 2000 2010

Nubieber first appeared as a census-designated place in the 2010 U.S. census.

The 2020 United States census reported that Nubieber had a population of 19. The population density was 25.4 inhabitants per square mile (9.8/km^{2}). Of the population, 11 were White, 1 was African American, 1 was Native American, 1 was Asian, 1 was from some other race, and 4 were from two or more races. Hispanic or Latino of any race were 2 persons.

There were 12 households, and the average household size was 1.58. The median age was 66.4 years.

There were 16 housing units, of which 12 were occupied. Of these, 8 were owner-occupied, and 4 were occupied by renters.

== Politics ==
In the state legislature, Nubieber is in the 1st senatorial district, represented by Republican Megan Dahle, and the 1st Assembly district, represented by Republican Heather Hadwick.

Federally, Nubieber is in California's 1st congressional district, represented by Republican James Gallagher.
