= Johnstonville, California =

Place in Lassen County

Johnstonville
- census-designated place
- Location of Johnstonville in Lassen County, California.

- Location in California
- Coordinates: 40°23′04″N 120°35′15″W
- Country: United States
- State: California
- County: Lassen

Area
  - Total: 8.631 sq mi (22.354 km^{2})
  - Land: 8.589 sq mi (22.245 km^{2})
  - Water: 0.042 sq mi (0.109 km^{2}) 0.49%
- Elevation: 4,131 ft (1,259 m)

Population (2020)
  - Total: 973
  - Density: 113/sq mi (43.7/km^{2})
- Time zone: UTC-8 (Pacific (PST))
  - Summer (DST): UTC-7 (PDT)
- GNIS feature IDs: 1658868; 2583042

Johnstonville (formerly, Toadtown) is a census-designated place in Lassen County, California, United States. It is located 4.5 miles (7 km) east-southeast of Susanville, at an elevation of 4131 feet (1259 m). Its population is 973 as of the 2020 census, down from 1,024 from the 2010 census.

The place was founded as Toadtown by settlers in 1857. The name reflected the abundance of toads at the place. A post office operated at Johnstonville from 1902 to 1943. The name honors Robert Johnston, who helped develop the town.

== Geography ==
According to the United States Census Bureau, the CDP has a total area of 8.6 square miles (22.4 km^{2}), of which over 99% is land.

=== Climate ===
This region experiences warm (but not hot) and dry summers, with no average monthly temperatures above 71.6 °F (22.0 °C). According to the Köppen Climate Classification system, Johnstonville has a warm-summer Mediterranean climate, abbreviated "Csb" on climate maps.

== Demographics ==
Historical population
Census	Pop.	Note	%±
2010	1,024		—
2020	973		−5.0%
U.S. Decennial Census; 2010

Johnstonville first appeared as a census designated place in the 2010 U.S. census.

The 2020 United States census reported that Johnstonville had a population of 973. The population density was 113.3 inhabitants per square mile (43.7/km^{2}). The racial makeup of Johnstonville was 791 (81.3%) White, 4 (0.4%) African American, 24 (2.5%) Native American, 14 (1.4%) Asian, 1 (0.1%) Pacific Islander, 51 (5.2%) from other races, and 88 (9.0%) from two or more races. Hispanic or Latino of any race were 134 persons (13.8%).

The whole population lived in households. There were 358 households, out of which 108 (30.2%) had children under the age of 18 living in them, 208 (58.1%) were married-couple households, 29 (8.1%) were cohabiting couple households, 71 (19.8%) had a female householder with no partner present, and 50 (14.0%) had a male householder with no partner present. 56 households (15.6%) were one person, and 27 (7.5%) were one person aged 65 or older. The average household size was 2.72. There were 274 families (76.5% of all households).

The age distribution was 204 people (21.0%) under the age of 18, 75 people (7.7%) aged 18 to 24, 216 people (22.2%) aged 25 to 44, 276 people (28.4%) aged 45 to 64, and 202 people (20.8%) who were 65 years of age or older. The median age was 44.3 years. For every 100 females, there were 107.9 males.

There were 403 housing units at an average density of 46.9 units per square mile (18.1 units/km^{2}), of which 358 (88.8%) were occupied. Of these, 289 (80.7%) were owner-occupied, and 69 (19.3%) were occupied by renters.

== Politics ==
In the state legislature, Johnstonville is in the 1st senatorial district, represented by Republican Megan Dahle, and the 1st Assembly district, represented by Republican Heather Hadwick.

Federally, Johnstonville is in California's 1st congressional district, represented by Republican James Gallagher.

== Notable person ==
- Nevada Barr, author
