= Madeline, California =

Unincorporated community in California, United States

- Unincorporated community Census-designated place
- Location in California Madeline, California (the United States)
- Coordinates: 41°3′5.08″N 120°28′31.56″W
- Country: United States
- State: California
- County: Lassen

Area
  - Total: 0.053 sq mi (0.14 km^{2})
  - Land: 0.053 sq mi (0.14 km^{2})
  - Water: 0 sq mi (0 km^{2})
- Elevation: 5,325 ft (1,623 m)

Population (2020)
  - Total: 21
  - Density: 400/sq mi (150/km^{2})
- Time zone: UTC-8 (Pacific)
  - Summer (DST): UTC-7 (PDT)
- GNIS feature ID: 2804434

Madeline is an unincorporated community and census-designated place (CDP) in Lassen County, California, United States. It is located 45 miles (72 km) north-northeast of Susanville, at an elevation of 5325 feet (1623 m). Its population is 21 as of the 2020 census.

A post office was operated at Madeline from 1875 to 1878, and from 1879 to 1882. It was reopened in 1887, and moved in 1902. The zip code for the town is 96119. Operating in 1964.

Madeline was formerly a stop on the now-abandoned Nevada-California-Oregon Railway, later taken over by the Southern Pacific Railroad.

== Climate ==
This region experiences warm (but not hot) and dry summers, with no average monthly temperatures above 71.6 °F. According to the Köppen Climate Classification system, Madeline has a warm-summer Mediterranean climate, abbreviated "Csb" on climate maps.

Climate data for Madeline, California, 1991–2020 normals, extremes 1908-1975
Month	Jan	Feb	Mar	Apr	May	Jun	Jul	Aug	Sep	Oct	Nov	Dec	Year
Record high °F (°C)	64 (18)	64 (18)	72 (22)	84 (29)	93 (34)	101 (38)	104 (40)	102 (39)	95 (35)	90 (32)	75 (24)	68 (20)	104 (40)
Mean daily maximum °F (°C)	41.0 (5.0)	43.7 (6.5)	48.9 (9.4)	54.1 (12.3)	63.5 (17.5)	73.6 (23.1)	84.7 (29.3)	83.7 (28.7)	76.2 (24.6)	62.7 (17.1)	49.2 (9.6)	39.9 (4.4)	60.1 (15.6)
Daily mean °F (°C)	30.3 (−0.9)	32.7 (0.4)	37.1 (2.8)	41.3 (5.2)	49.2 (9.6)	57.0 (13.9)	65.4 (18.6)	64.0 (17.8)	57.3 (14.1)	46.6 (8.1)	36.7 (2.6)	29.5 (−1.4)	45.6 (7.6)
Mean daily minimum °F (°C)	19.6 (−6.9)	21.6 (−5.8)	25.2 (−3.8)	28.5 (−1.9)	35.0 (1.7)	40.4 (4.7)	46.1 (7.8)	44.3 (6.8)	38.3 (3.5)	30.5 (−0.8)	24.1 (−4.4)	19.0 (−7.2)	31.1 (−0.5)
Record low °F (°C)	−28 (−33)	−26 (−32)	−20 (−29)	8 (−13)	12 (−11)	20 (−7)	26 (−3)	20 (−7)	19 (−7)	9 (−13)	−8 (−22)	−36 (−38)	−36 (−38)
Average precipitation inches (mm)	1.73 (44)	1.38 (35)	1.50 (38)	1.33 (34)	1.58 (40)	0.89 (23)	0.34 (8.6)	0.27 (6.9)	0.30 (7.6)	0.68 (17)	1.28 (33)	1.84 (47)	13.12 (334.1)
Average snowfall inches (cm)	17.0 (43)	10.0 (25)	9.9 (25)	4.7 (12)	2.7 (6.9)	0.2 (0.51)	0.0 (0.0)	0.0 (0.0)	0.0 (0.0)	1.3 (3.3)	3.6 (9.1)	9.4 (24)	58.8 (148.81)
Source 1: PRISM (41.0514°N 120.4754°W, 5,328 feet (1,624 m), spatially interpolated, 1991-2020 normals)
Source 2: WRCC (extremes, snow)

== Demographics ==
Historical population
Census	Pop.	Note	%±
2020	21		—
U.S. Decennial Census; 1850–1870 1880-1890; 1900 1910 1920; 1930 1940 1950; 1960 1970 1980; 1990 2000 2010; 2020

Madeline first appeared as a census designated place in the 2020 U.S. census.

=== 2020 Census ===
Madeline CDP, California – Racial and ethnic composition Note: the US Census treats Hispanic/Latino as an ethnic category. This table excludes Latinos from the racial categories and assigns them to a separate category. Hispanics/Latinos may be of any race.
Race / Ethnicity (NH = Non-Hispanic)	Pop 2020	% 2020
White alone (NH)	9	42.86%
Black or African American alone (NH)	0	0.00%
Native American or Alaska Native alone (NH)	0	0.00%
Asian alone (NH)	1	4.76%
Pacific Islander alone (NH)	0	0.00%
Other race alone (NH)	0	0.00%
Mixed race or Multiracial (NH)	4	19.05%
Hispanic or Latino (any race)	7	33.33%
Total	21	100.00%
