= Spaulding, California =

Spalding
- census-designated place
- Location in California
- Coordinates: 40°39′11″N 120°46′19″W
- Country: United States
- State: California
- County: Lassen

Area
  - Total: 3.329 sq mi (8.622 km^{2})
  - Land: 3.329 sq mi (8.622 km^{2})
  - Water: 0 sq mi (0 km^{2}) 0%
- Elevation: 5,138 ft (1,566 m)

Population (2020)
  - Total: 206
  - Density: 61.9/sq mi (23.9/km^{2})
- Time zone: UTC-8 (Pacific (PST))
  - Summer (DST): UTC-7 (PDT)
- GNIS feature IDs: 1659837, 2583148

Spalding (formerly Spalding Tract and Spaulding Tract) is an unincorporated community and census-designated place in Lassen County, California, United States. It is located on the west side of Eagle Lake, 2.1 miles (3.4 km) east-northeast of Whaleback Mountain and 3 miles (4.8 km) northeast of Eagle Lodge, at an elevation of 5138 feet (1566 m). Its population is 206 as of the 2020 census, up from 178 from the 2010 census.

In 1914, John S. Spalding laid out the town. The place was subdivided in 1924.

== Geography ==
According to the United States Census Bureau, the CDP has a total area of 3.3 square miles (8.6 km^{2}), all land.

== Demographics ==
Historical population
Census	Pop.	Note	%±
2010	178		—
2020	206		15.7%
U.S. Decennial Census; 1850–1870 1880-1890; 1900 1910 1920; 1930 1940 1950; 1960 1970 1980; 1990 2000 2010

Spalding first appeared as a census-designated place in the 2010 U.S. census.

The 2020 United States census reported that Spalding had a population of 206. The population density was 61.9 inhabitants per square mile (23.9/km^{2}). The racial makeup of Spaulding was 185 (89.8%) White, 1 (0.5%) African American, 1 (0.5%) Native American, and 19 (9.2%) from two or more races. Hispanic or Latino of any race were 14 persons (6.8%).

The whole population lived in households. There were 115 households, out of which 25 (21.7%) had children under the age of 18 living in them, 66 (57.4%) were married-couple households, 10 (8.7%) were cohabiting couple households, 15 (13.0%) had a female householder with no partner present, and 24 (20.9%) had a male householder with no partner present. 23 households (20.0%) were one person, and 12 (10.4%) were one person aged 65 or older. The average household size was 1.79. There were 84 families (73.0% of all households).

The age distribution was 13 people (6.3%) under the age of 18, 9 people (4.4%) aged 18 to 24, 46 people (22.3%) aged 25 to 44, 63 people (30.6%) aged 45 to 64, and 75 people (36.4%) who were 65 years of age or older. The median age was 58.6 years. For every 100 females, there were 92.5 males.

There were 610 housing units at an average density of 183.2 units per square mile (70.7 units/km^{2}), of which 115 (18.9%) were occupied. Of these, 103 (89.6%) were owner-occupied, and 12 (10.4%) were occupied by renters.

== Politics ==
In the state legislature, Spalding is in the 1st senatorial district, represented by Republican Megan Dahle, and the 1st Assembly district, represented by Republican Heather Hadwick.

Federally, Spalding is in California's 1st congressional district, represented by Republican James Gallagher.

== See also ==
- Whaleback Fire
