= Little Valley, California =

Unincorporated community in California, United States

- Census-designated place
- Location in Lassen County, California

- Location in California Location in the United States
- Coordinates: 40°53′40″N 121°10′39″W
- Country: United States
- State: California
- County: Lassen

Area
  - Total: 0.42 sq mi (1.10 km^{2})
  - Land: 0.42 sq mi (1.08 km^{2})
  - Water: 0.012 sq mi (0.03 km^{2})
- Elevation: 4,190 ft (1,277 m)

Population (2020)
  - Total: 84
  - Density: 200/sq mi (78/km^{2})
- FIPS code: 06-41908

Little Valley is an unincorporated community and census-designated place in Lassen County, California, United States. It is located 43 miles (69 km) northwest of Susanville, at an elevation of 4,190 feet (1,280 m). Its population is 84 as of the 2020 census.

== Demographics ==
Historical population
Census	Pop.	Note	%±
2020	84		—
U.S. Decennial Census
