= Skedaddle Mountains =

Mountain range in California, US

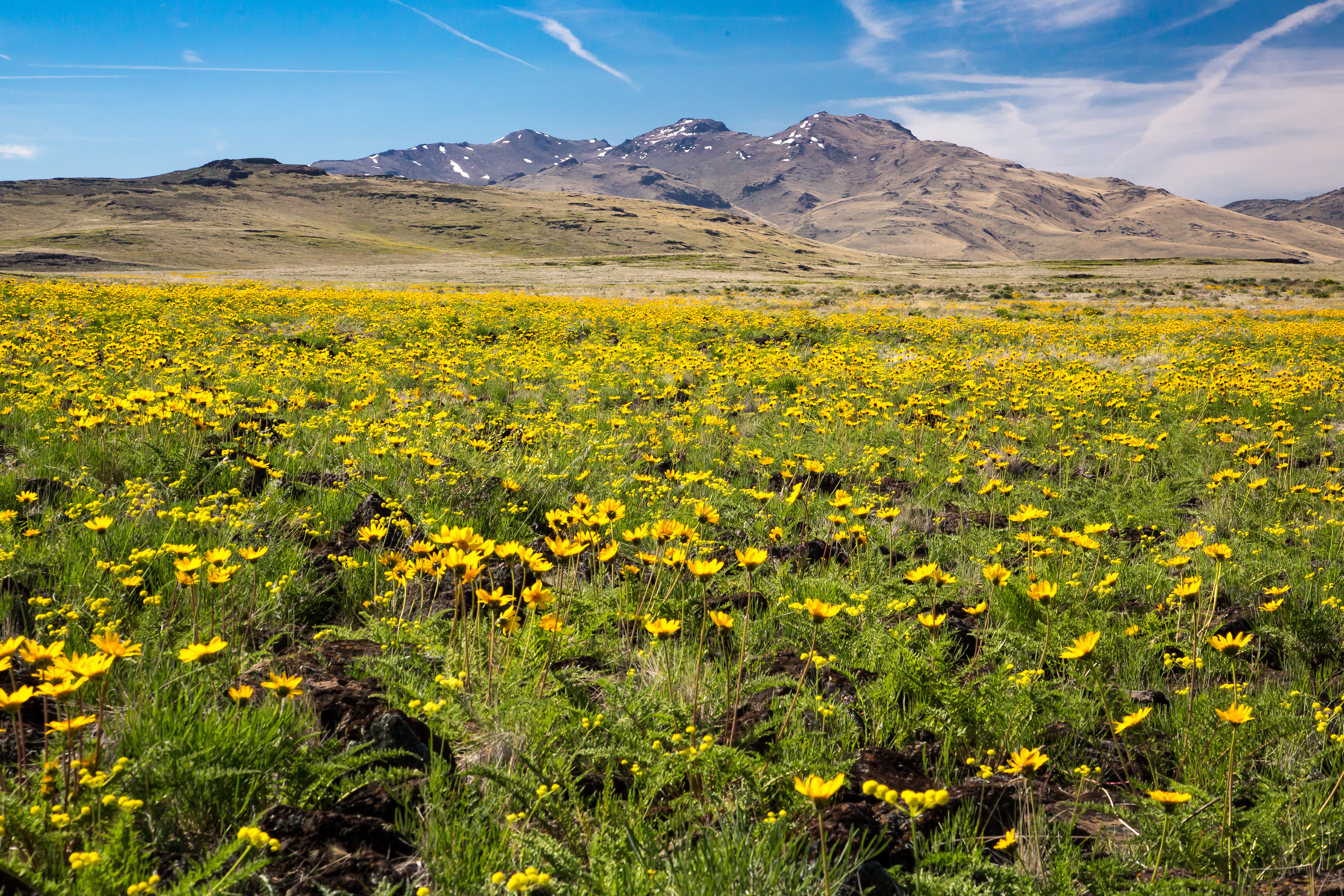

Highest point
- Peak: Hot Springs Peak
- Elevation: 2,333 m (7,654 ft)
- Coordinates: 40°22′30.08″N 120°7′17.51″W

Geography
- Location within California Location within the United States
- Country: United States
- State: California
- District: Lassen County
- Topo map: USGS Bull Flat

The Skedaddle Mountains are a mountain range that span southeast Lassen County, California. The tallest peak in this range is Hot Springs Peak, which stands at 2,333 m (7,654 ft) tall.

The communities of Belfast, Litchfield, and Wendel are located at or near the edges of this range.
