= Lassen County, California =

County in California, United States

Lassen County
- County
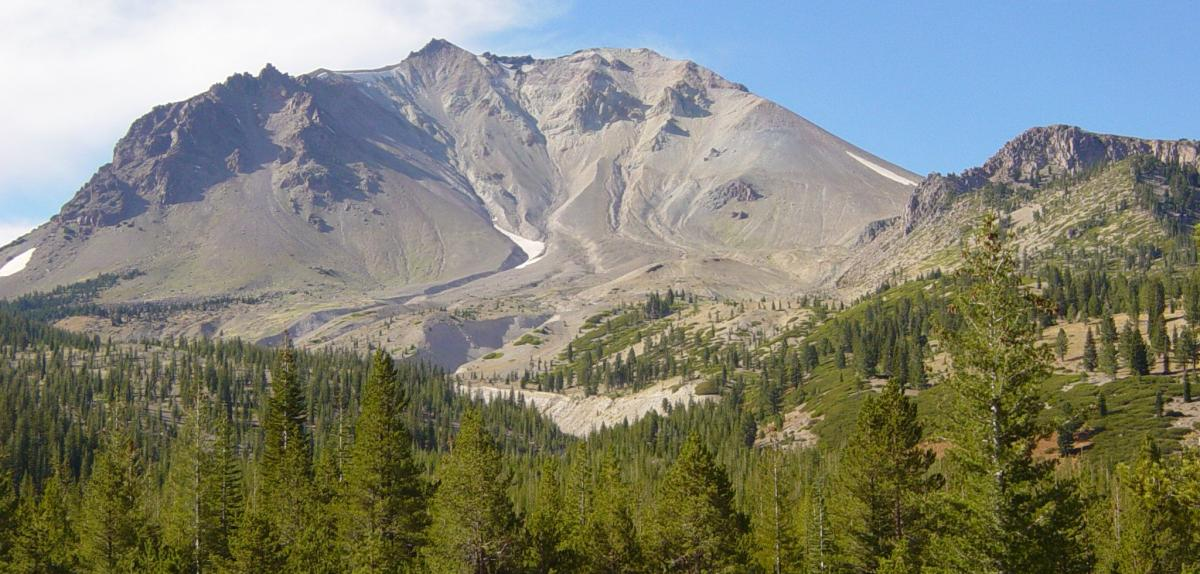
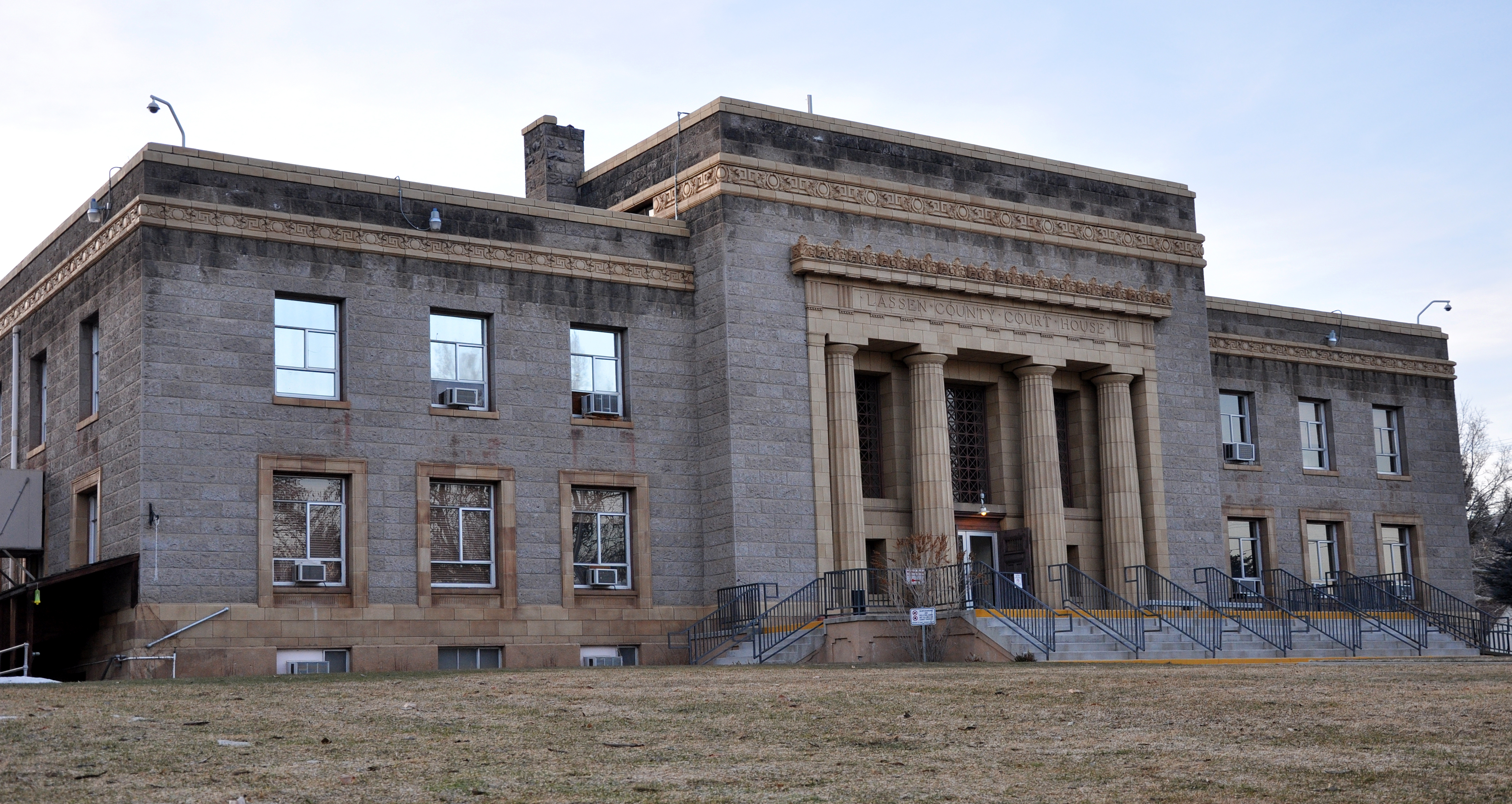
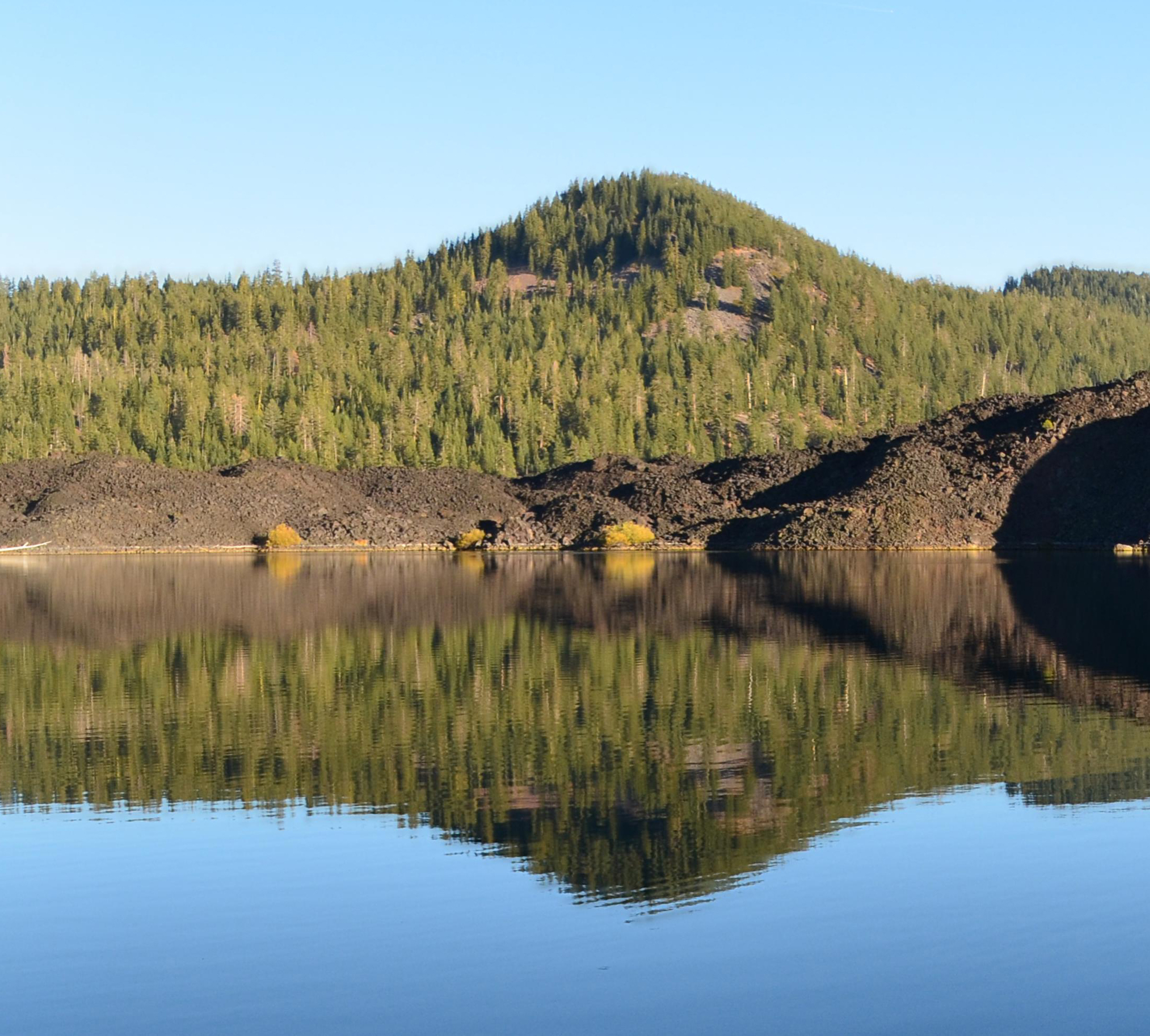
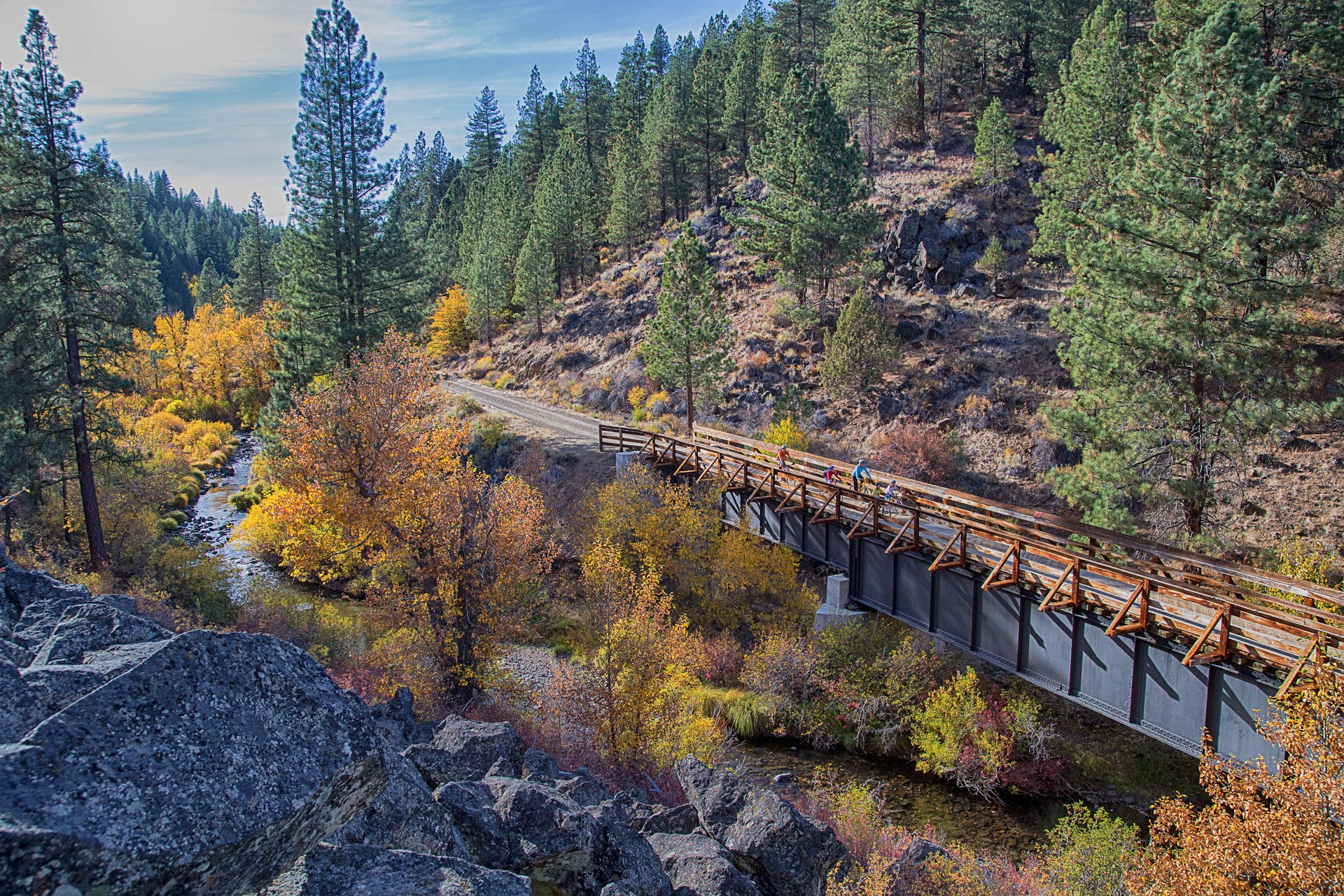
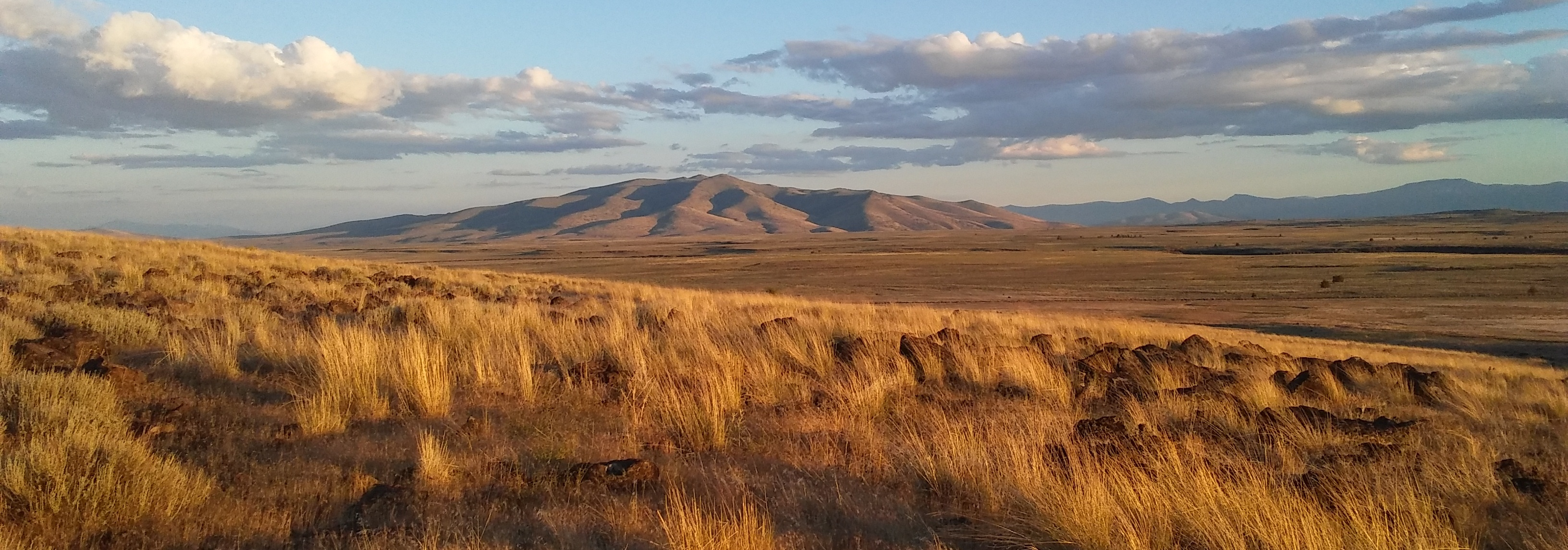
- Lassen Volcanic National Park Susanville Johnstonville Butte Lake Bizz Johnson Trail Shaffer Mountain in the Skedaddles

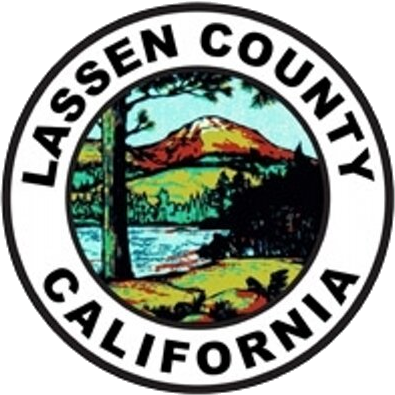
- Seal
- Interactive map of Lassen County
- Location in the state of California
- Coordinates: 40.715287°N 120.621223°W
- Country: United States
- State: California
- Region: Shasta Cascade
- Incorporated: 1 April 1864
- Named for: Peter Lassen
- County seat: Susanville
- Largest city: Susanville

Government
  - Type: Council–CAO
  - Body: Board of Supervisors
  - Chair: Gary Bridges
  - Vice Chair: Aaron Albaugh
  - Board of Supervisors: Supervisors: Mike Scanlan; Gary Bridges; Tom Neely; Aaron Albaugh; Jason Ingram
  - County Administrative Officer: Susan R Parker

Area
  - Total: 4,720.115 sq mi (12,225.04 km^{2})
  - Land: 4,541.369 sq mi (11,762.09 km^{2})
  - Water: 178.746 sq mi (462.95 km^{2})
- Highest elevation: 8,741 ft (2,664 m)

Population (2020)
  - Total: 32,730
  - Estimate (2025): 28,117 ▼
  - Density: 7.207/sq mi (2.783/km^{2})

GDP
  - Total: $1.298 billion (2022)
- Time zone: UTC−8 (Pacific Standard Time)
  - Summer (DST): UTC−7 (Pacific Daylight Time)
- Area code: 530 and 837
- Congressional district: 1st
- Website: www.lassencounty.gov

Lassen County (/ˈlæsən/ LASS-ən) is a county located in the northeastern portion of the U.S. state of California. As of the 2020 census, the population was 32,730. Its county seat and the largest city is Susanville.

Lassen County comprises the Susanville, California micropolitan statistical area. A former farming, mining, and lumber area, its economy now depends on employment at one federal and two state prisons; the former in Herlong and the latter two in Susanville. In 2007, half the adults in Susanville worked in one of the facilities.

== History ==
Lassen County was formed on April 1, 1864, from parts of Plumas and Shasta counties following the two-day conflict known as the Sagebrush War, also called the Roop County War, that started on Sunday morning, February 15, 1863. Due to uncertainties over the California border, the area that is now Lassen County was part of the unofficial Nataqua Territory and Roop County, Nevada, during the late 1850s and early 1860s.

The county was named by California after Peter Lassen, along with Lassen Peak, which is in adjoining Shasta County. Lassen was one of General John C. Fremont's guides, and a famous trapper, frontiersman, and Indian fighter. He was murdered under mysterious circumstances near the Black Rock Desert in 1859, and his murder was never solved.

By the 1880s small towns began to spring up all over Lassen County. Bieber developed at the north end of the county, in rich farmland. Gold was discovered at Hayden Hill, and the small town developed to support the miners. Hayden Hill no longer exists: when the mining stopped, the townspeople left for other communities. Madeline was formed at the north end of another rich farming valley, and along the railroad tracks heading north to Alturas, California. This community still has about 50 people living in and around the town. In the 1890s many immigrant family groups arrived in the county, primarily coming from Lincolnshire and Herefordshire, England as well as the towns of Belgrade, Novi Sad, Niš and Kragujevac in Serbia. Several "Yankee" settlers arrived from Waldo County, Maine and Lincoln County, Maine as well.

During World War I, the area was heavily in favor of American entry into the war, and a disproportionate amount of volunteers from Lassen County signed up to take part in the war effort. A pro-German newspaper editor from San Francisco noted that "the inhabitants of Lassen County" were "sympathetic to Britain, hostile to Germany, and indifferent to France."

A narrow gauge railroad, the Nevada-California-Oregon Railway, ran through Lassen County from 1880 to 1927. The NCOR was the longest small gauge of the century. It was intended to connect Reno, Nevada, to the Columbia River, but only 238 miles (383 km) of track were laid, from Reno to Lakeview, Oregon.

In 1913, the Fernley & Lassen Railroad was built and it was used to export timber from the large forests of Lassen County. As this railroad was completed, the Red River Lumber Company set up shop, building the town of Westwood, California, to support its massive logging operation. Two other lumber mills followed the Red River Lumber Co. They built their mills in the county seat of Susanville. The Lassen Lumber and Box Company and the Fruit Growers Company both operated mills in Susanville for several decades.

In 2003, Anderson-based Sierra Pacific Industries announced plans to relocate or lay off 150 workers as they closed the last lumber mill in Susanville due to the lack of large timber for the mill. Sierra Pacific chose to close the mill permanently rather than spend the several million dollars required to convert the mill from large to small timber.

Since the late 20th century, three prisons have been opened in and near Susanville: California Correctional Center (minimum security, 1963) and High Desert State Prison (California) (maximum security, 1995), both in the city; and the nearby Federal Correctional Institution, Herlong (opened 2007). In 2007, half the adults in Susanville worked in one of the three prisons. In "job-starved rural America, ... residents see them [prisons] as the last and only chance for employment after work at the lumber mill or the dairy dries up."

== Education ==
Lassen County is served by Lassen Community College, Lassen High School District, Mt. Lassen Charter School, Thompson Peak Charter School, Diamond Mountain Charter High, Diamond View Middle School, Herlong High School, Meadow View Elementary, McKinley Elementary, Long Valley Charter School, Fort Sage Charter School, and Westwood Junior Senior High School.

== Geography ==
Hog Flat Reservoir covered in snow during early April

According to the United States Census Bureau, the county has a total area of 4,720.115 square miles (12,225.04 km^{2}), of which 4,541.369 square miles (11,762.09 km^{2}) is land and 178.746 square miles (462.95 km^{2}) (3.79%) is water. It is the 8th largest county in California by total area. Part of Lassen Volcanic National Park extends onto a western corner of the county.

=== Adjacent counties ===
- Modoc County – north
- Washoe County, Nevada – east
- Sierra County – southeast
- Plumas County – south
- Shasta County – west

=== National protected areas ===
- Lassen National Forest (part)
- Lassen Volcanic National Park (part)
- Modoc National Forest (part)
- Plumas National Forest (part)
- Toiyabe National Forest (part)

== Demographics ==
Historical population
Census	Pop.	Note	%±
1870	1,327		—
1880	3,340		151.7%
1890	4,239		26.9%
1900	4,511		6.4%
1910	4,802		6.5%
1920	8,507		77.2%
1930	12,589		48.0%
1940	14,479		15.0%
1950	18,474		27.6%
1960	13,597		−26.4%
1970	14,960		10.0%
1980	21,661		44.8%
1990	27,598		27.4%
2000	33,828		22.6%
2010	34,895		3.2%
2020	32,730		−6.2%
2025 (est.)	28,117	▼	−14.1%
U.S. Decennial Census; 1790–1960 1900–1990; 1990–2000 2010–2020

As of the third quarter of 2024, the median home value in Lassen County was $264,340.

As of the 2023 American Community Survey, there are 9,060 estimated households in Lassen County with an average of 2.64 persons per household. The county has a median household income of $64,395. Approximately 17.1% of the county's population lives at or below the poverty line. Lassen County has an estimated 39.5% employment rate, with 13.2% of the population holding a bachelor's degree or higher and 79.1% holding a high school diploma.

The top five reported ancestries (people were allowed to report up to two ancestries, thus the figures will generally add to more than 100%) were English (81.9%), Spanish (15.0%), Indo-European (0.8%), Asian and Pacific Islander (2.1%), and Other (0.3%).

The median age in the county was 37.8 years.

=== American Community Survey 2025 data ===
The United States Census Bureau estimated that in 2025, Lassen County’s population was 30,697. It was also estimated that the county's population was 58.86% Non-Hispanic White, 27.38% Hispanic or Latino, 5.99% Non-Hispanic Black, 2.01% Asian, 2.25% Native American, 0.36% Pacific Islander, and 3.15% Multiracial.

Total	Population	Percentage
Non-Hispanic White	18,067	58.86%
Hispanic or Latino	8,404	27.38%
Non-Hispanic Black	1,839	5.99%
Asian	618	2.01%
Native American	692	2.25%
Pacific Islander	110	0.36%
Non-Hispanic Multiracial	967	3.15%

=== 2020 census ===
As of the 2020 census, Lassen County had a population of 32,730, 9,888 households, and 6,383 families, yielding a population density of 7.2 inhabitants per square mile (2.8/km^{2}) with 12,216 housing units at an average density of 2.69 per square mile (1.0/km^{2}).

The median age was 37.2 years; 16.8% of residents were under the age of 18 and 14.5% were 65 years of age or older. For every 100 females there were 172.5 males, and for every 100 females age 18 and over there were 193.1 males.

Of the county's 9,888 households, 29.4% had children under the age of 18 living with them and 23.2% had a female householder with no spouse or partner present. About 28.5% of all households were made up of individuals and 12.8% had someone living alone who was 65 years of age or older. There were 12,216 housing units, of which 19.1% were vacant; among occupied units, 65.9% were owner-occupied and 34.1% were renter-occupied, with a homeowner vacancy rate of 3.3% and a rental vacancy rate of 8.5%.

The racial makeup of the county was 64.4% White, 7.0% Black or African American, 3.3% American Indian and Alaska Native, 1.5% Asian, 0.9% Native Hawaiian and Pacific Islander, 15.1% from some other race, and 7.9% from two or more races, while Hispanic or Latino residents of any race comprised 23.0% of the population.

27.5% of residents lived in urban areas, while 72.5% lived in rural areas.

=== Racial and ethnic composition ===
Lassen County, California – Racial and ethnic composition Note: the US Census treats Hispanic/Latino as an ethnic category. This table excludes Latinos from the racial categories and assigns them to a separate category. Hispanics/Latinos may be of any race.
Race / Ethnicity (NH = Non-Hispanic)	Pop 1980	Pop 1990	Pop 2000	Pop 2010	Pop 2020	% 1980	% 1990	% 2000	% 2010	% 2020
White alone (NH)	18,700	21,920	23,893	23,270	19,534	86.33%	79.43%	70.63%	66.69%	59.68%
Black or African American alone (NH)	751	1,699	2,976	2,790	2,244	3.47%	6.16%	8.80%	8.00%	6.86%
Native American or Alaska Native alone (NH)	634	790	959	999	939	2.93%	2.86%	2.83%	2.86%	2.87%
Asian alone (NH)	121	293	244	337	472	0.56%	1.06%	0.72%	0.97%	1.44%
Native Hawaiian or Pacific Islander alone (NH)	x	x	134	163	283	0.40%	0.47%	0.40%	0.47%	0.86%
Other race alone (NH)	38	13	267	363	142	0.18%	0.05%	0.79%	1.04%	0.43%
Mixed race or Multiracial (NH)	x	x	674	856	1,585	x	x	1.99%	2.45%	4.84%
Hispanic or Latino (any race)	1,417	2,883	4,681	6,117	7,531	6.54%	10.45%	13.84%	17.53%	23.01%
Total	21,661	27,598	33,828	34,895	32,730	100.00%	100.00%	100.00%	100.00%	100.00%

=== 2010 census ===
As of the 2010 census, there were 34,895 people, 10,058 households, and _ families residing in the county. The population density was 7.7 inhabitants per square mile (3.0/km^{2}). There were 12,216 housing units at an average density of 2.80 per square mile (1.1/km^{2}). The racial makeup of the county was 73.17% White, 8.12% African American, 3.54% Native American, 1.02% Asian, 0.47% Pacific Islander, 10.21% from some other races and 3.47% from two or more races. Hispanic or Latino people of any race were 17.53% of the population.

Population reported at 2010 census
The County	Total; Population	White	African; American	Native; American	Asian	Pacific; Islander	other races	two or more races	Hispanic or Latino (of any race)
Lassen County	34,895	25,532	2,834	1,234	356	165	3,562	1,212	6,117
Incorporated city	Total; Population	White	African; American	Native; American	Asian	Pacific; Islander	other races	two or more races	Hispanic or Latino (of any race)
Susanville	17,947	11,269	2,249	612	198	111	2,928	580	4,259
Census-designated place	Total; Population	White	African; American	Native; American	Asian	Pacific; Islander	other races	two or more races	Hispanic or Latino (of any race)
Bieber	312	264	0	15	1	0	24	8	72
Clear Creek	169	149	0	5	0	2	1	12	15
Doyle	678	583	14	37	3	2	12	27	55
Herlong	298	187	38	16	1	3	9	44	46
Janesville	1,408	1,283	13	32	11	3	27	39	118
Johnstonville	1,024	929	7	16	13	0	26	33	73
Litchfield	195	176	0	0	0	0	14	5	25
Milford	167	150	1	1	1	1	4	9	11
Nubieber	50	26	0	13	0	0	6	5	10
Patton Village	702	552	48	27	4	5	18	48	62
Spaulding	178	168	0	3	1	0	1	5	6
Westwood	1,647	1,430	3	104	10	2	49	49	179
Other unincorporated areas	Total; Population	White	African; American	Native; American	Asian	Pacific; Islander	other races	two or more races	Hispanic or Latino (of any race)
All others not CDPs (combined)	10,120	8,366	461	353	113	36	443	348	1,186

=== 2000 census ===
As of the 2000 census, there were 33,828 people, 9,625 households, and 6,776 families residing in the county. The population density was 7.0 inhabitants per square mile (2.7/km^{2}). There were 12,000 housing units at an average density of 3.0 per square mile (1.2/km^{2}). The racial makeup of the county was 80.81% White, 8.84% African American, 3.26% Native American, 0.74% Asian, 0.43% Pacific Islander, 3.23% from some other races and 2.69% from two or more races. Hispanic or Latino people of any race were 13.84% of the population.

In terms of ancestry, 13.8% were of German, 12.1% Irish, 10.5% English, 8.7% American and 5.0% Italian ancestry. 88.2% spoke English and 10.3% Spanish as their first language.

There were 9,625 households, out of which 35.9% had children under the age of 18 living with them, 55.8% were married couples living together, 10.3% had a female householder with no husband present, and 29.6% were non-families. Of all households, 24.5% were made up of individuals, and 9.2% had someone living alone who was 65 years of age or older. The average household size was 2.59 and the average family size was 3.08.

In the county, the population was spread out, with 21.8% under the age of 18, 10.8% from 18 to 24, 36.9% from 25 to 44, 21.4% from 45 to 64, and 9.0% who were 65 years of age or older. The median age was 35 years. For every 100 females there were 168.8 males. For every 100 females age 18 and over, there were 192.2 males.

The median income for a household in the county was $36,310, and the median income for a family was $43,398. Males had a median income of $37,333 versus $26,561 for females. The per capita income for the county was $14,749. About 11.1% of families and 14.0% of the population were below the poverty line, including 16.1% of those under age 18 and 7.8% of those age 65 or over.

== Politics ==
=== Voter registration ===
Population and registered voters
Total population	35,001	
Registered voters (Note: Percentage of registered voters with respect to total population. Percentages of party members with respect to registered voters follow.)	13,932	39.8%
Democratic	3,401	24.4%
Republican	6,687	48.0%
Democratic–Republican spread	-3,286	-23.6%
Independent	726	5.2%
Green	43	0.3%
Libertarian	95	0.7%
Peace and Freedom	37	0.3%
Americans Elect	1	0.0%
Other	67	0.5%
No party preference	2,875	20.6%

==== Cities by population and voter registration ====
Cities by population and voter registration
City	Population	Registered voters	Democratic	Republican	D–R spread	Other	No party preference
Susanville	17,728	25.2%	26.7%	44.1%	-17.4%	12.5%	22.0%

=== Overview ===
From 1932 through 1976, Lassen was powerfully Democratic, voting for the Democratic presidential nominee in every election save 1972, when it voted for Nixon over McGovern by just 6.8%. From 1980 on, however, it has been overwhelmingly Republican in presidential and congressional elections, coinciding with the dominance of the prisons in local employment. Jimmy Carter (in 1976) remains the last Democrat to have carried the county.

United States presidential election results for Lassen County, California (Note: This total comprised 559 votes for Progressive Theodore Roosevelt (who was official Republican nominee in California), 148 votes for Socialist Eugene V. Debs and 34 votes for Prohibition Party nominee Eugene W. Chafin.)
Year	Republican		Democratic		Third party(ies)	
Year	No.	%	No.	%	No.	%
1892	540	48.09%	524	46.66%	59	5.25%
1896	420	43.66%	528	54.89%	14	1.46%
1900	549	58.10%	326	34.50%	70	7.41%
1904	573	62.69%	301	32.93%	40	4.38%
1908	551	54.61%	361	35.78%	97	9.61%
1912	27	1.91%	644	45.61%	741	52.48%
1916	877	36.96%	1,323	55.75%	173	7.29%
1920	1,582	66.22%	643	26.92%	164	6.86%
1924	1,072	40.78%	356	13.54%	1,201	45.68%
1928	2,111	56.73%	1,597	42.92%	13	0.35%
1932	1,167	26.89%	3,056	70.41%	117	2.70%
1936	1,035	19.62%	4,193	79.47%	48	0.91%
1940	1,902	30.13%	4,367	69.17%	44	0.70%
1944	1,896	33.92%	3,678	65.81%	15	0.27%
1948	1,960	33.95%	3,632	62.91%	181	3.14%
1952	3,313	43.66%	4,237	55.83%	39	0.51%
1956	2,533	42.48%	3,412	57.22%	18	0.30%
1960	2,365	40.24%	3,472	59.08%	40	0.68%
1964	2,124	34.25%	4,072	65.67%	5	0.08%
1968	2,553	41.06%	2,930	47.12%	735	11.82%
1972	3,618	50.80%	3,134	44.00%	370	5.20%
1976	3,007	42.97%	3,801	54.32%	190	2.72%
1980	4,464	54.45%	2,941	35.87%	793	9.67%
1984	5,352	61.09%	3,254	37.14%	155	1.77%
1988	5,157	58.59%	3,446	39.15%	199	2.26%
1992	3,836	37.02%	3,388	32.70%	3,138	30.28%
1996	5,194	52.60%	3,318	33.60%	1,363	13.80%
2000	7,080	66.88%	2,982	28.17%	524	4.95%
2004	8,126	70.97%	3,158	27.58%	166	1.45%
2008	7,483	65.72%	3,586	31.49%	318	2.79%
2012	7,296	68.30%	3,053	28.58%	334	3.13%
2016	7,574	71.97%	2,224	21.13%	726	6.90%
2020	8,970	74.83%	2,799	23.35%	218	1.82%
2024	8,619	75.80%	2,478	21.79%	274	2.41%

Lassen County is in California's 1st congressional district, represented by Republican James Gallagher. is in the 1st Senate District, represented by Republican Megan Dahle, and the 1st Assembly district, represented by Republican Heather Hadwick.

== Crime ==
The following table includes the number of incidents reported and the rate per 1,000 persons for each type of offense.

Population and crime rates
Population	35,001	
Violent crime	96	2.74
Homicide	1	0.03
Forcible rape	6	0.17
Robbery	9	0.26
Aggravated assault	80	2.29
Property crime	196	5.60
Burglary	101	2.89
Larceny-theft (Note: Only larceny-theft cases involving property over $400 in value are reported as property crimes.)	229	6.54
Motor vehicle theft	25	0.71
Arson	11	0.31

=== Cities by population and crime rates ===
Cities by population and crime rates
City	Population	Violent crimes	Violent crime rate per 1,000 persons	Property crimes	Property crime rate per 1,000 persons
Susanville	17,849	96	5.38	320	17.93

== Infrastructure ==
The Tunnison Mountain Wilderness Study Area

=== Airports ===
Susanville Municipal Airport, Herlong Airport and Westwood Airport are general aviation airports in the county. The closest major airport is in Reno.

=== Major highways ===
- U.S. Route 395
- State Route 36
- State Route 44
- State Route 139
- State Route 70
- State Route 147
- State Route 299

=== Public transportation ===
Lassen Rural Bus (LRB), operated by the Lassen Transit Service Agency, runs a local service in Susanville, with longer distance routes to Westwood and Doyle.

=== Utilities ===
The Lassen Municipal Utility District (LMUD) is the primary electric utility in the county, and was created in 1986 by purchasing transmission facilities from CP National (now Pacificorp) at a cost of $19 million. In 2019 it had 42 employees, and the General Manager was Doug C. Smith. It is powered in part by the Honey Lake biomass power plant, which runs on wood waste from the nearby Lassen National Forest. The Whaleback Fire caused a significant outage in 2018.

== Communities ==
=== City ===
- Susanville (county seat)

=== Census-designated places ===
- Bieber
- Clear Creek
- Doyle
- Herlong
- Janesville
- Johnstonville
- Litchfield
- Little Valley
- Madeline
- Milford
- Nubieber
- Patton Village
- Spaulding
- Stones Landing
- Westwood

=== Unincorporated communities ===
- Ravendale
- Standish
- Termo
- Wendel

=== Population ranking ===
The population ranking of the following table is based on the 2020 census of Lassen County.

† county seat

Rank	City/Town/etc.	Municipal type	Population (2020 Census)
1	† Susanville	City	16,728
2	Janesville	CDP	2,461
3	Westwood	CDP	1,541
4	Johnstonville	CDP	973
5	Patton Village	CDP	632
6	Susanville Indian Rancheria	AIAN	570
7	Doyle	CDP	536
8	Bieber	CDP	266
9	Herlong	CDP	237
10	Spaulding	CDP	206
11	Clear Creek	CDP	175
12	Litchfield	CDP	160
13	Milford	CDP	147
14	Stones Landing	CDP	86
15	Little Valley	CDP	84
16	Madeline	CDP	21
17	Nubieber	CDP	19

== See also ==
- National Register of Historic Places listings in Lassen County, California
