= Horsetown, California =

Historical place in Shasta County, United States

Horsetown Clear Creek Diggings
- Clear Creek near Horsetown

- Location within California Location within the United States
- 40.4944°N 122.4980°W
- Location: Clear Creek Road, Reading, California

History
- Built: 1851

Site notes
- Architect: 49er mining town

Horsetown was a major historical mining town on the Clear Creek in Reading, California, United States in Shasta County. The town was founded as a tent mining town in 1851 after Major Pierson Barton Reading found gold just east of where the town was founded. Reading's gold find site is called Reading's Bar after the sandbar on Clear Creek. The small mining town was first called Clear Creek Diggings in 1851, it was founded on Clear Creek Road and Clear Creek. As the town grew it was given the name One Horse Town and then it was changed to Horsetown. The gold found here starting a California Gold Rush in the surrounding area.

== History ==
Reading gold discovery was a major part of the California Gold Rush and news of the find started the Northern California 49ers Gold Rush. Reading started to look for gold soon after hearing about the Sutter's Mill gold discovery. Reading worked as John Sutter’s clerk and trapper in 1844. The town was the home to some miners and served the many miners in the mining valley. In 1855, Horsetown covered 36 acres with a population of 1,000, by 1856 it was 2,000. Lots of water is needed for mining gold, so the miners built a small dam along Clear Creek. By October 1849 about 250 men were mining on Clear Creek. The 49er miner, Alexander Andrews at Clear Creek diggings built the Horsetown Bridge near Reading’s bar to cross Clear Creek safely. Andrews wrote about his time in Clear Creek Diggings. He noted a good day of mining would get a miner about $100 a day in gold in 1853 ($3,987.00 in today's money), but prices of goods were also high. At its peak during the start of the finds in the winter of 1849 miners were finding $200 a day as gold was being found in all the river, creek, or stream in the valley, as there was more water in the winter. Duffy built Duffy’s Ditch that brought water into Horsetown. A dam and water system was built by Nathan Townsend, who sold water to the miners. Townsend sold the system to Enos Taylor and William Harrison Elmore in 1856. A second and much larger water system was built in 1855, the Clear Creek Ditch, with 49 miles of flumes. A stagecoach road was built from Stockton & Andrews’ Bridge to Horsetown. The water was traveling through a 460-foot hard rock tunnel. To store the winter rainfall a 5-acre earthwork reservoir was built. The water intake for the ditch was near the stagecoach stop at Tower House on the wagon road to Yreka. Most of the former Horsetown water system is now under Whiskeytown Lake built in 1963 with the Whiskeytown Dam 11 miles north of Horsetown. In 1850, a wagan road was built from Red Bluff and Shasta, with a stop at Briggsville and Horsetown. In 1852 Father Florian built the first church in Horsetown. Shasta County's first Wells Fargo Express offices and telegraph office was in Horsetown. By 1860 most of the gold had run out and the town was not busy anymore. Most of the goods at Townsend came by wagon train from Shasta. In 1868, the town of Horsetown was destroyed by a fire and was not rebuilt. The site, Grant Redding, on Clear Creek Road, is now back to oak trees in a rural canyon, 10 miles east of the Redding Municipal Airport.

From Horsetown the gold rush moved out to a number of small mining towns north of the Clear Creek, including: Briggsville, Muletown, Lower Springs, Texas Springs, Middletown, Piety Hill, Igo, Larkin, Jackass Flat, Ono, Bald Hills, Janesville, and to the north Whiskeytown, Shasta, Tower House, and French Gulch.

== Horsetown Clear-Creek Preserve ==
Horsetown Clear-Creek Preserve is an 27-acre nature preserve run by volunteers as a Nonprofit organization founded in 1988. Horsetown Clear-Creek Preserve has over 200 members. Along the creek the volunteers have day-use spots with hiking trails, picnic tables and in the spring and fall volunteer run interpretive walks and events. The Horsetown Clear-Creek Preserve is also a safe place for Chinook Salmon spawning.

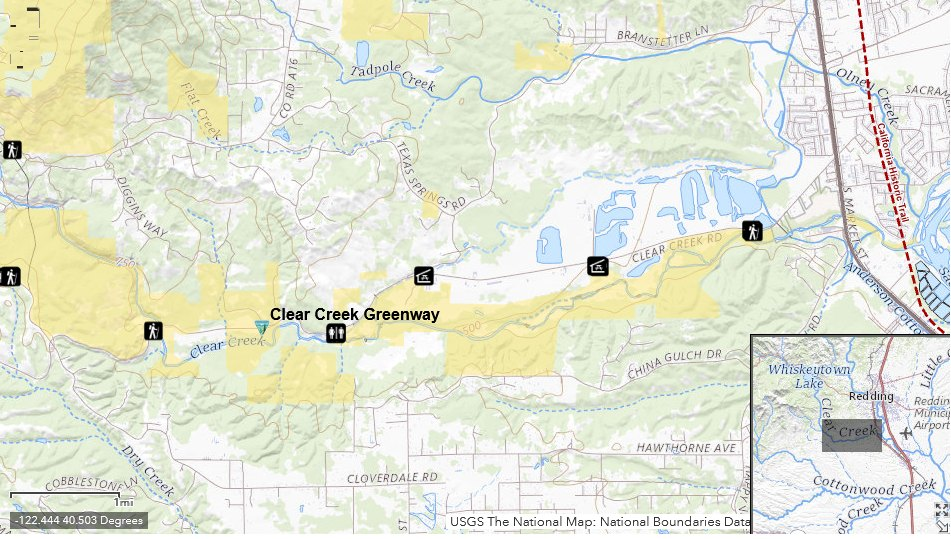
Map Reading's Bar, Clear Creek and Horsetown Clear-Creek Preserve

== Gallery ==
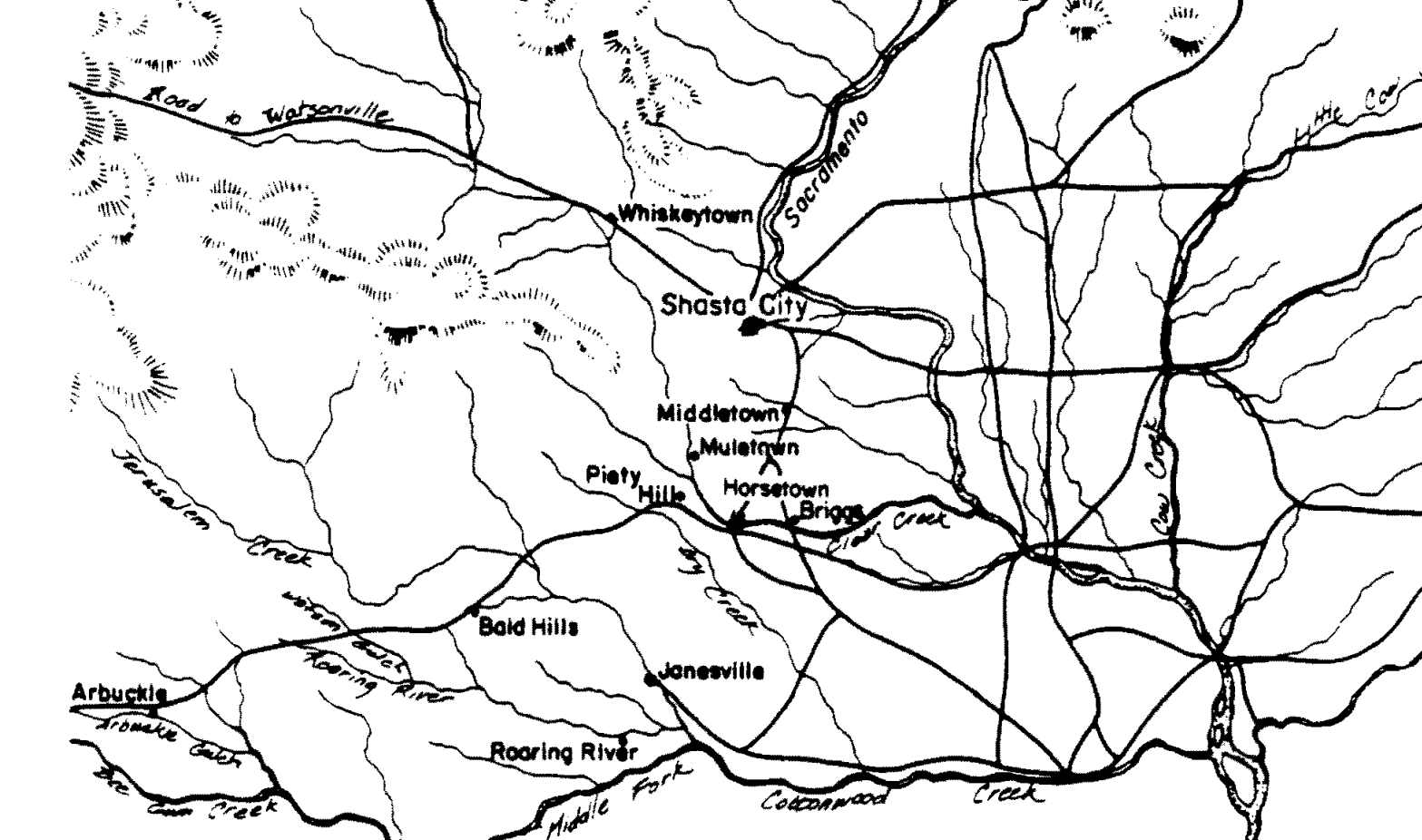
1862 map of mining towns in Shasta County California

Horsetown Clear-Creek Preserve Sign

Horsetown Clear-Creek Preserve Trail Head Sign

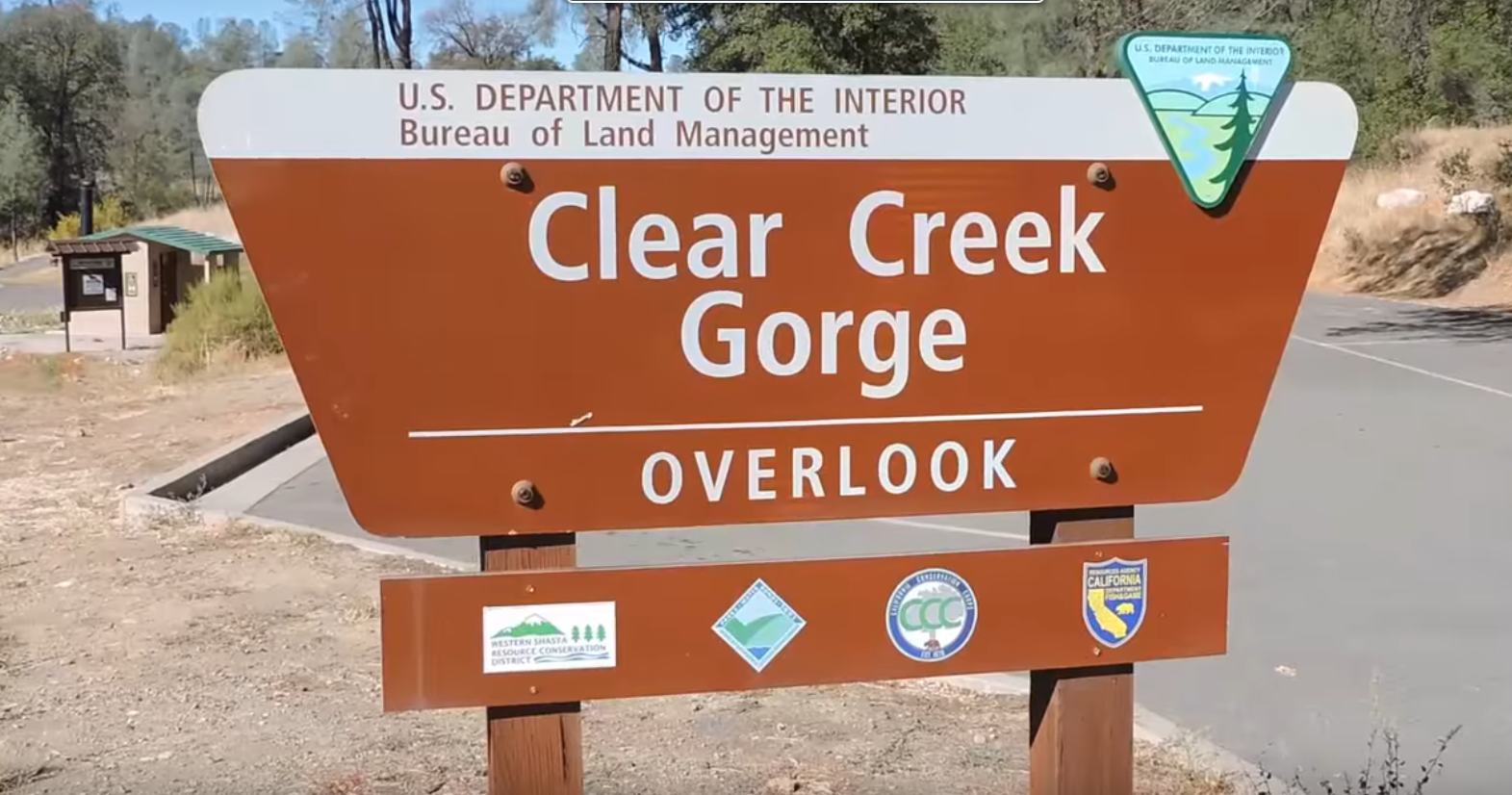
Clear Creek Gorge BLM sign

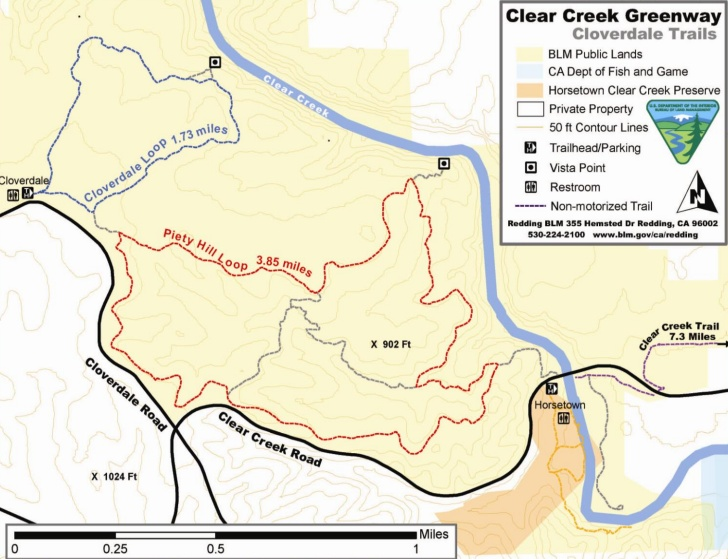
Clear Creek Greenway Cloverdale Trails BLM Map

== See also ==
- California Historical Landmarks in Shasta County
- Bell's Bridge (California) on Clear Creek
- Centerville, Shasta County, California just north of Reading's Bar
- Placer mining
