= Tower House Historic District =

Historical place in Shasta County, United States

- Tower House Historic District; Tower House, California
- U.S. National Register of Historic Places

- Location within California
- Location: Ca 299, Whiskeytown National Recreation Area; California
- Coordinates: 40.664°N 122.636°W
- Built: 1852
- NRHP reference No.: 73000257
- Added to NRHP: July 2, 1973

Camden House after the 2018 Carr Fire burned the yard; the house itself was saved

Tower House, California was a mining town in Shasta County. The mining District of Tower House was placed on the National Register of Historic Places on July 2, 1973, as #73000257 as the Tower House Historic District. The Tower House Historic District is located just west of the Whiskeytown National Recreation Area. The town started as a California Gold Rush camp. The town is named after Levi Tower, who built the Tower House Hotel and helped establish the town.

== History ==
Major Pierson Barton Reading found gold at Reading's Bar south of Tower House on the Clear Creek in May 1848, starting a California Gold Rush in the surrounding area. Tower House was built at the site were three creeks merge into one creek: Mill Creek, Willown Creek flow into Clear Creek. Clear Creek flows down to Reading's Bar and the town that was started there Horsetown. Before the town was built the lands were part of the Wintu Tribe. The other founders of the town were Charles Camden and Philena Camden, and Wintu American Kate Camden.

North of Tower House was the mining town of French Gulch, now the French Gulch Historic District. A stagecoach and covered wagon road was built from French Gulch to Tower House. Other roads at Tower House were: a road north to Scott Mountains then to Yreka; a road east to Weaverville and on to Humboldt Bay, and the road east to Shasta, the Old Shasta Road that Tower built. This made Tower House a key place to stop and rest for travelers. This made Tower House a key stopping spot for travelers.

The Tower House Hotel became the center of the town, it was used as a Hotel, community center, election precinct, mining district Headquarters, part-time courthouse, stagecoach stop, and telegraph office. When Levi Tower was sold the land in 1852 for the hotel, a small trading post and a bridge across Clear Creek were already in the small town since 1825. The California-Oregon stage Company had a stop at the Hotel starting in 1858. The California-Oregon stage Company also leased stables from Tower for keeping fresh horses ready for the stagecoach use. The California-Oregon stage Company ran though Tower House till 1870, when it changed its route and bypassed Tower House. Due to is fine food and construction, the hotel became a summer resort for those in the hot summer Central Valley 1870's. The Tower House Hotel was lost in 1919 fire and not rebuilt.

Buildings that are still standing include the Bickford Mine (also called the El Dorado Mine), the Camden House, the Carriage House, the Levi Tower Grave Site, the Tenant Farmhouse, barns, bridges, and other houses. The Tower House Historic District is administered by the National Park Service. The Tower House Historic District is on the outside southwestern edge of the Interlakes Recreation Area.

== Levi Tower ==
Levi Tower, with peaches from his 1,000 assorted fruit orchards, in 1860.

Levi Tower was born on September 10, 1820, in Cumberland, Rhode Island. Hearing about the Gold Rush out west he sail on the Edward Everett to California in 1949. Businessman Charles Camden and Tower became friends and then went into a partners building in Tower House startining in 1852. He streamed upriver on the Jacob M Ryerson to Shasta County. He bought the Schneider's Trading Post in town. Then after building the 21-room, 3-story Tower House Hotel he had planted a large 1,000 assorted fruit orchards, including apples, pears, peaches, plums, cherries, apricots and nectarines. He also had 400 grapevines and a plant nursery. With Tower House Hotel doing well, he purchased a hotel in Shasta (Globe Hotel) and then a hotel in Redding. He ran for a Shasta County office and won, Shasta County Supervisors from 1856 to 1858. With oil lamps and candle for lighting, the Shasta hotel burnt in 1853 and Redding hotel was lost to fire in 1855. Tower and Camden had joint wedding ceremony at the Free Bridge House (name changed to Tower House later) on November 11, 1852, Camden to Tower's sister Philena and Tower to Mary Shuffleton. Tower's marriage did not last and ended 1854, controversial at the time. Due to the lost in burnt hotels Tower sold the Tower House Hotel to Camden in 1858. Charles leased the orchards back to Tower which were still making money. Tower died in San Francisco 12 November 1865, age 45, of typhoid fever.

== Charles Camden ==
Charles Camden in 1880

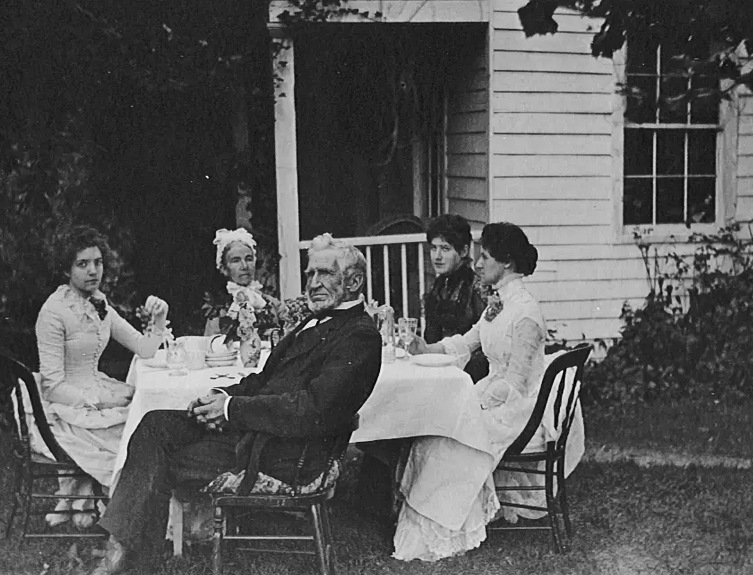
Charles and Philena at Camden House tea with three daughters in 1880

Charles Camden was a very successful businessman in Shasta County in the 1800s. Camden was born in England on January 29, 1817. At 17 he came to and worked in New York City. From New York to traveled to South America as an engineer in Chile and Peru. Hearing of Gold in California to arrived in California in 1949. He became a business partner with Levi Tower to build the Tower House. He made his money in a gold claim on Clear Creek, tolls Roads he had built, saw mill for lumber supply, and water systems that supplied water to miners and mining towns down stream from Tower House. His Clear Creek claim was worked for 18-years and produced $80,000 of gold from his Iron Mountain Mine. After marriage to Tower's sister Philena, they had three daughters. The help raise the girls they hired Native American girl that they named Kate Camden. Those very rich the Camden lived in modest home, that was expanded in 1867. Camden died in 1912. Camden house is part of the Tower House Historic District. One of Shasta County's oldest houses is the Camden House. The Camden Water Ditch was local small scale ditch aqueduct system that brought water from Clear Creek to his house and mine. Next Camden built the a large water system that sold water to towns and miners downstream from Tower House.

The Camden Iron Mountain Mine is near Tower House, Camden was in a Co-claim with William Magee and James Sallee. The mine had rich deposits of iron, silver, and copper. From 1880 to 1895 mine main product was iron and silver. Camden made money in investing in the Spring Valley Water Company of Northern California. Later in life Camdene joined the Society of California Pioneers. Camden wrote three autobiographical books.

== See also ==
- National Register of Historic Places listings in Shasta County, California
- California Historical Landmarks in Shasta County
