= Whiskeytown (disambiguation) =

Whiskeytown is a former American rock/alternative country band.

Whiskeytown may also refer to:

== Geography ==
- Whiskeytown Unit, one of the units of the Whiskeytown–Shasta–Trinity National Recreation Area in Shasta County, Northern California
  - Whiskeytown, California, an unincorporated community flooded in the process of creating Whiskeytown Lake
  - Whiskeytown Lake, a reservoir in the Whiskeytown Unit
  - Whiskeytown Falls, a three-tiered waterfall in the Whiskeytown Unit
