= Reading's Bar =

Historical place in Shasta County, United States

Reading's Bar Clear Creek Diggings Horsetown
- Clear Creek near Horsetown

- Location within California Location within the United States
- 40.4937°N 122.4933°W
- Location: Clear Creek Road, Reading, California

History
- Built: May 1848

Site notes
- Architect: Gold Find then 49 mining town

California Historical Landmark
- Designated: August 1, 1932
- Reference no.: 32

Reading's Bar is a historical site in Redding, California in Shasta County. Reading's Bar is a California Historical Landmark No. 32 listed on August 1, 1932. Reading's Bar was named after Major Pierson Barton Reading, who discovered gold on the Clear Creek bar in May 1848, starting a California Gold Rush in the surrounding area. Later he found gold on a sandbar on the Trinity River that started the Trinity Alps Gold Rush. Reading's gold discovery was a major part of the California Gold Rush and news of the find created a rush of gold prospecting in Northern California, well north of the better-known gold fields of the Sierra Nevada foothills.

Following the Reading's Bar gold discovery, a number of small mining towns grew up on and north of the Clear Creek including: Horsetown, Briggsville, Muletown, Lower Springs, Texas Springs, Middletown, Piety Hill, Igo, Larkin, Jackass Flat, Ono, Bald Hills, Janesville, and to the north Whiskeytown, Shasta, Tower House, and French Gulch.

== Reading's Bar Historical markers ==
The California historical marker is at Clear Creek Bridge, on Clear Creek Road, 6.9 miles West of old Hwy 99 West of Redding. Marker was placed there by the California Department of Parks and Recreation working with the Shasta Historical Society, Darrell Moss Historical Fund and Trinitarianus Chapter 62, E Clampus Vitus.
A second Reading's Bar marker is at Douglas City, California, in Trinity County near Readings Trinity River find. The marker was placed there by E Clampus Vitus, Trinitarianus Chapter 62/Trinity County Sesquicentennial Committee in 1968.

== Pierson Barton Reading ==
California pioneer Pierson Barton Reading (1816-1868) came to California in a wagon train in 1843. In 1844 he was given a Mexican land grant, Rancho Buena Ventura. Reading was a member of John C. Frémont's California Battalion in the Mexican-American War and participated in the Bear Flag Revolt. Reading was one of the signers of the Treaty of Cahuenga on January 13, 1847, which ended the war in Alta California. Following the war, Reading became known for his discovery of gold at Clear Creek, near Redding, California.

== Horsetown ==
Just west of Reading's Bar on Clear Creek the mining town of Clear Creek Diggings was formed in 1851 at the site of Clear Creek Road and Clear Creek. The town served the many miners in the valley. As the town grew it was given the name One Horse Town and then changed to Horsetown. In 1855, Horsetown covered 36 acres with a population of 1,000, by 1856 it was 2,000. Lots of water is needed for mining gold, so the miners built a small dam on Clear Creek. By October 1849 about 250 men were mining on Clear Creek. The 49er miner, Alexander Andrews at Clear Creek diggings built the Horsetown Bridge near Reading's bar to cross Clear Creek safely. Duffy built Duffy’s Ditch that brought water into Horsetown. A stagecoach road was built from Stockton & Andrews’ Bridge to Horsetown. A second large water system was built in 1855, the Clear Creek Ditch, with 49 miles of flumes. The site of the former Horsetown is now the Horsetown Clear-Creek Preserve, a nonprofit preserve.

== Briggsville ==
Briggsville, California was a major mining camp located one mile east of Horsetown on Clear Creek at 40.49511°N 122.47772°W. It was founded by Benjamin F. Briggs, and was called Breechesburg in its early days. Briggs' wife made it known she could not abide the miners' unkempt habits, and the town was cleaned up somewhat. A toll bridge was built over Clear Creek at Briggsville in 1852 by Briggs and Joel T. Landrum. In 1853 the Briggsville Hotel and general store were built. A stagecoach road was built from Shasta to Red Bluff that passed through Briggsville. A lime kiln and limestone quarry were established in Briggsville in 1855. In 1861 the Briggsville toll bridge became owned by Landrum & Ralston, and was now called Ralston's Bridge. Briggsville's water supply was sourced from the Clear Creek Ditch and reservoir project, opened in 1855. The only remains of the town are two wood-burning stone kilns in Bulgin Gulch that were used to make plaster and mortar. It was first run by Samuel R. Clough and his wife, Debora Clough. By 1866 Briggsville boasted a large Chinese population. Aside from the kilns, nothing remains of the town. The closest city to old Briggsville is Igo, California in Shasta County.

== Muletown ==
Muletown, California was a small mining camp founded in 1849. It was located north of Horsetown on Muletown road. Similarly to Horsetown, the camp was first called One Mule Town. The location of the center of the town has been lost to time, but it is known that the town itself was on the north bank of Clear Creek about 2 miles northwest of Horsetown, at about 40.517639°N 122.522694°W. Clear Creek Ditch supplied water to Muletown. The ditch was four feet wide at the bottom, and six feet wide at the top, with water flowing three feet deep. It ran from the Tower House, (now in the Whiskeytown National Recreation Area), then headed south along Clear Creek to Horsetown and the mining towns of Middletown, Muletown, Texas Springs, and Jackass Flat. The Clear Creek Ditch dropped seven feet per mile along its course. A branch ditch fed Horsetown. The Muletown road is a 5.5 mile-long road that runs north–south. Its southern end is the former site of Muletown. By the mid- to late 1860s the easy gold had run out, and many of the town's miners moved on. There was some hydraulic mining, but this was outlawed in 1884. Dredging the creek also began as the easy gold ran out. Drift mining was also used. The town no longer exists.

== Lower Springs ==
Lower Springs, California was small mining camp on Salt Creek about 4 miles north of Horsetown at 40.55423°N 122.4753°W, now the Swasey Recreational Area off Swasey Drive. Clear Creek Ditch supplied water to Lower Springs and opened on November 24, 1855. The largest buildings in the town was the Swasey's Hotel & casino and the Swasey mercantile store, built by Benjamin Swasey from New Hampshire and make is money at the Gold Gulch claim. Benjamin Swasey was born on January 31, 1822, in New Hampshire and he died in Oakland, California on September 19, 1912. The town was built after the gold find at the Lower Springs mining district near Reading Springs (now Shasta). The first wood house was built in 1850. A second hotel opened the Virginia House. A second general store opened in 1854, by the J.D. Dunlap & Company. The town was very anti-Chinese. The town had a general store, a pottery shop, Henry Jones Blacksmith Shop and two hotels, the Virginian House and Swasey Hotel. The Swasey Hotel & casino had two large palm trees in front, new site for Northern California. Swasey Hotel also had a garden, plant nursery and orchards. Swasey sold his plants and crops in the county. From China one of the first orange crops was from Lower Springs. The town had a stage stop for some years. On April 17, 1851, Merady Swan, from Missouri, was killed in native tribe attack, one of many raids. Henry Jones & Company had hard rock mine nearby, also the Old Spanish Mine. Bert Wiser opened the Wiser & Terry vineyard. In 1851 Munroe & Felt of Sacramento hired McCummings to drive a simple Stagecoach to take passengers from Red Bluffs to Shasta, with stops at Lower Springs, Bells Bridge, Canon House (Canyon House), the main office was at the St. Charles hotel. The town no longer exists, but there is a Lower Springs Road.

== Texas Springs ==
Texas Springs, California is Gold Rush Mining town founded in the 1849. Texas Springs was northeast of Horsetown on Texas Springs Road at 40.510694°N 122.447667°W. A miner nicknamed Texas found gold here in 1948 and started the dry digging gold rush in the valley. The mining nearby was in Dutch Gulche, Jackass Hill and Spring Flats. In 1857 a dam was built at Texas Springs and some dry digging were able to now used water. In 1958 Texas Springs was given the right to vote and run for offices. Texas Springs had a mixed Chinatown, which had farming, Texas Springs did not have anti-China conflicts. Wm. Weil & Co. general mercantile store and B. F. Koontz Store were the main stores in Texas Springs. Another store open later the Wright-Bedford Store that opened in 1858. In 1859 Wright-Bedford started a daily covered wagon train service for goods and passengers from Texas Springs to Middletown (now Grant) a 5-mile trip north. On November 17, 1958, a fire burned some of the town, including the blacksmith shop, a hotel and some homes. The town repaired after the fire. In 1860 Texas Springs opened two one-room schoolhouses, one was lost to fire. The Texas Springs Rock Quarry was founded in 1894 and stopped in 1903. The Texas Springs Rock Quarry supplied the stones for the Shasta County Courthouse and the rock wall in fornt of the Courthouse. The Texas Springs Rock Quarry rocks were also used for railroad culverts, tombstones, and the trimmings on buildings. The only remains of the town is the Texas Springs Road, the Texas Springs Rock Quarry, a few stone foundations and small Texas Springs Pioneer Cementy, upper and lower Cementies.

== Jackass Flat ==
Jackass Flat, California was a small mining town between Horsetown and Larkin (now Centerville). Jackass Flat was founded north of Horsetown after gold was found at Reading's Bar. The Clear creek Ditch Company provided water for the town of Jackass Flat and the surrounding mines, as the water ditch passed by on its way to Horsetown. A road was built from Jackass Flat to Bald Hills, which crossed the Stockton & Andrew's Bridge. A Stagecoach line also used the road opened in 1858. Jackass Flat supplied the nearby tent mining camps in Buljon Gulch-Jackass Hill. Jackass Hill large claim were the Johnson, Lull and Company and G.M. Roach mining.

== Bald Hills ==
Bald Hills, California was a small mining town that started with about 25 miners. It was named Bald Hills, as the hills had no trees, unlike the other nearby hills. Bald Hills was west of Horsetown and Piety Hill, these towns are where Bald Hills wagon trains supplied Butler & Webb's Store in Bald Hills. Bald Hills was 6 miles south of Ono, California, between North Fork and Middle Fork of Cottonwood Creek at 40.3822°N 122.5798°W.The 10-miles Bald Hills ditch supplied water to the town and mines, which opened in 1856. Cottonwood Ditch owned by Messrs. Abel and C. Barnum also supplied water to nearby mines. Active mines were: Thornton & Watson; Barnum, Love, White & Fowler; Mr. Jonathan Baker; John Abel, and W. Miller. In the 1860s Bald Hills has McDonald's Express wagon to ring goods and passengers. In the 1870s James S. Drew operated a blacksmith shop, Henry Gary opened a general store, Gary's Store and Bald Hills Lodge, No. 170 headed by Brother William S. Kidder, opened. In 1872 a school was opened. By 1880 with gold running out, only five homes were in Bald Hills, some raising cattle. The largest cattle ranch was The 8,360 acres diamond stock range started by Hardin & Riley sold in 1899 to the Cosmos Land and Water Company. Booker Gill had a large sheep ranch, lost in a large July 1901 fire. In 1902 Bald Hills put 25th a large rodeo with 100s attending. In 1911, the Bald Hills Chinese Store closed. In 1917 the 5,000 acres James Miller ranch was sold to Trinity Land and Cattle Company. The town's Cemetery is called Bland Cemetery.
Bald Hills supported a nearby small mining towns of Kimball Plains, this became the 600 acres Kimball ranch, sold in 1922 from K. King sold to James Barry at 40.392°N 122.395°W, now at Kimball Plains road. Bald Hills also supported a nearby small mining town of Antelope on Gas Point Road and Antelope Creek at 40.3772°N 122.4394°W. In Antelope on August 2, 1881, a School was founded. Antelope's first teacher was May K. Giles then Carrie Hayden. The school's founding families were: Riggins, Shelton, Scovell, and Duggins, the school closed in 1940.

== Roaring River ==
Roaring River, California was a company owned mining town on the Roaring River. The Roaring River Gold Dredging Company also worked the North and Middle Fork of the Cottonwood Creek that flowed in the Roaring River. Roaring River was south of Horsetown at 40.395°N 122.52444°W. Roaring River Mine appears on a 1862 Shasta county town map, in 1862; it may have been a mining town or company town. Roaring River Mine was a small gold mine in Shasta county at an elevation of 623 feet, part of the Point-Backbone Mining District. The mine operated along 10,559 feet of the rivers, mostly dredging till 1941, ending with the start of World War II.

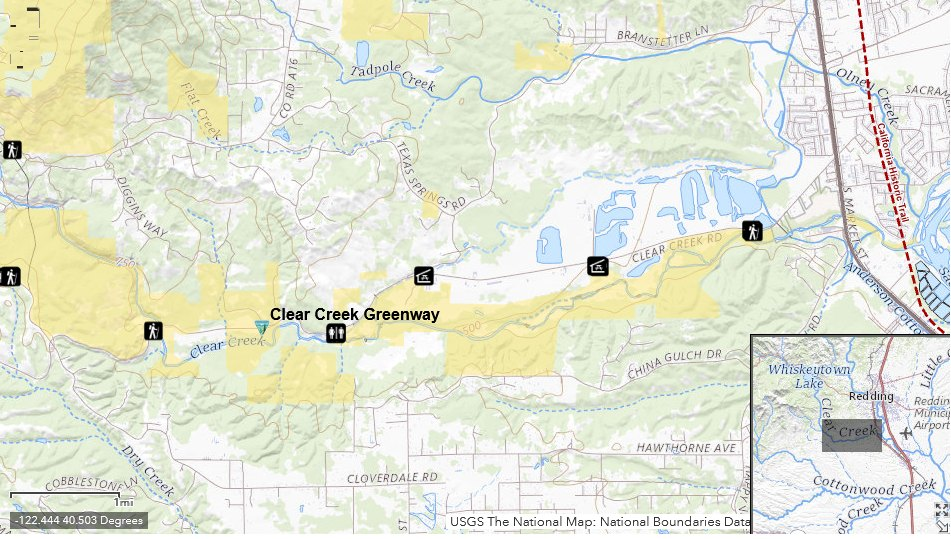
Map Reading's Bar, Clear Creek and Horsetown Clear-Creek Preserve

== Gallery ==
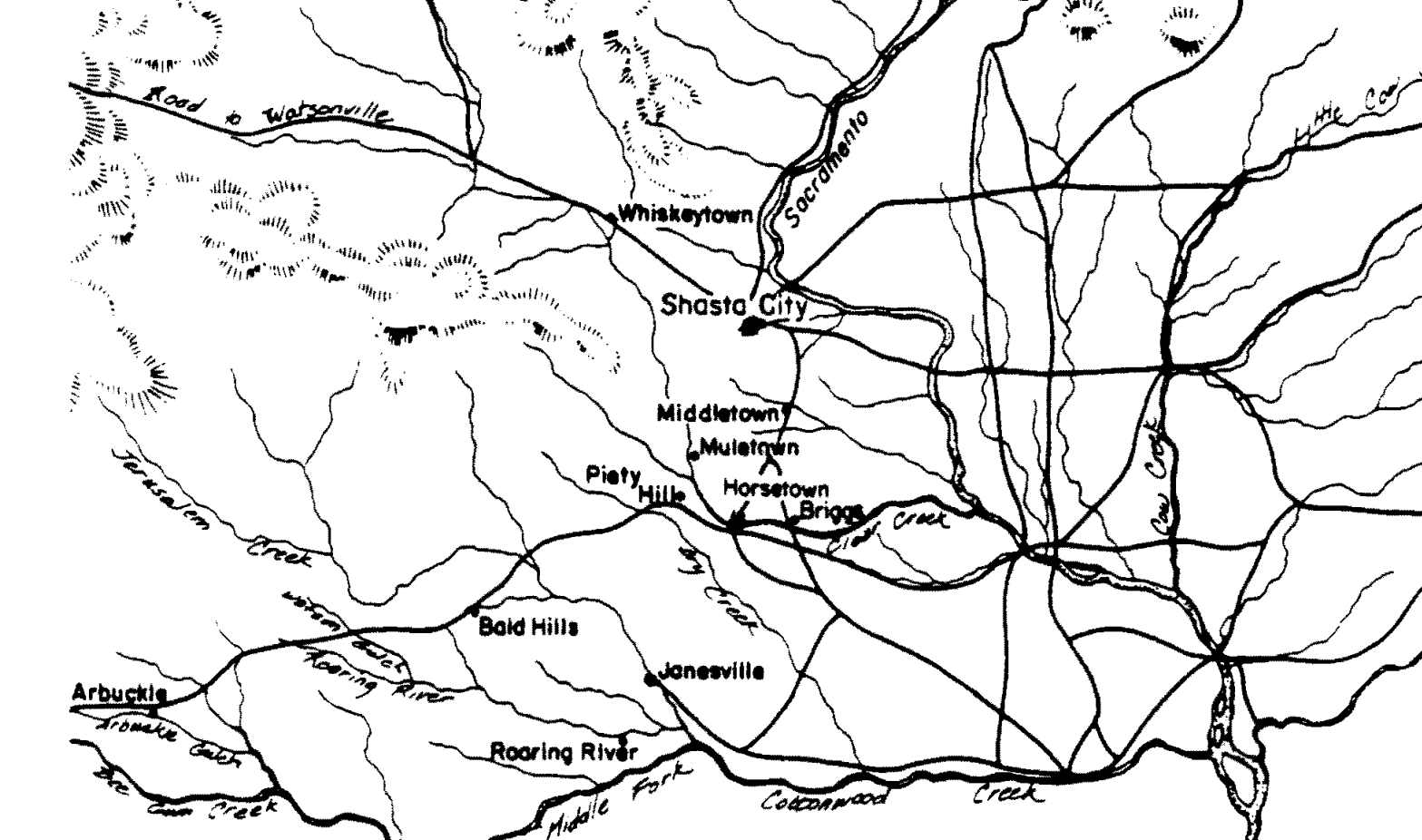
1862 map of mining towns in Shasta County California

Horsetown Clear-Creek Preserve Sign

Horsetown Clear-Creek Preserve Trail Head Sign

Clear Creek near Reading's Bar

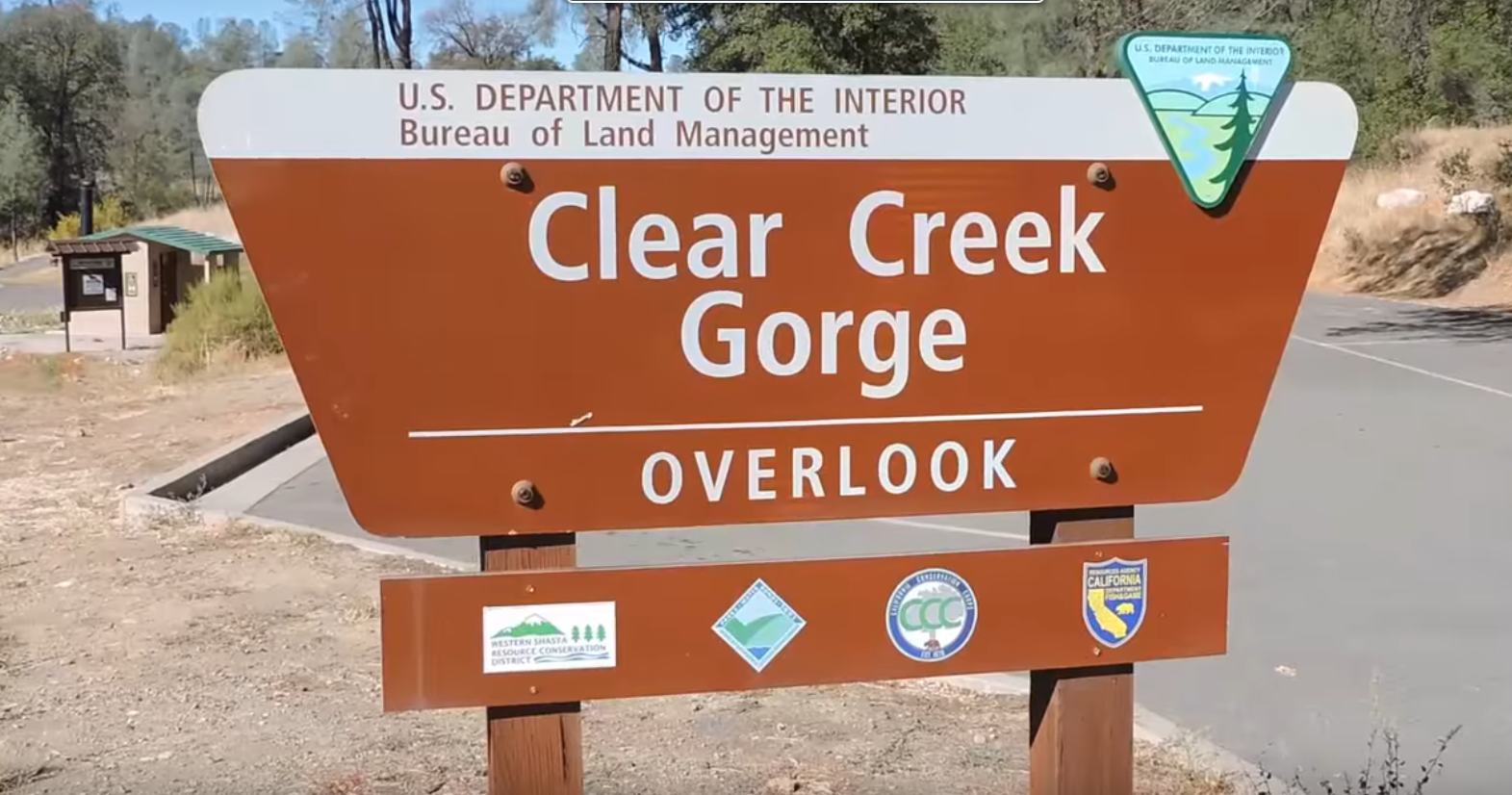
Clear Creek Gorge BLM sign

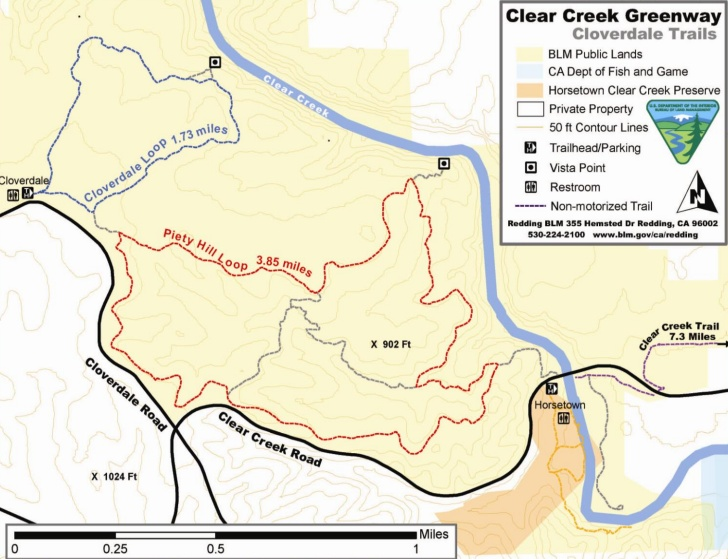
Clear Creek Greenway Cloverdale Trails BLM Map

Benjamin Swasey in 1880 founder of Lower Springs, California

== See also ==
- California Historical Landmarks in Shasta County
- Bell's Bridge (California) on Clear Creek
- Centerville, Shasta County, California just north of Reading's Bar
- Placer mining
