= Piety Hill, California =

Historical place in Shasta County, United States

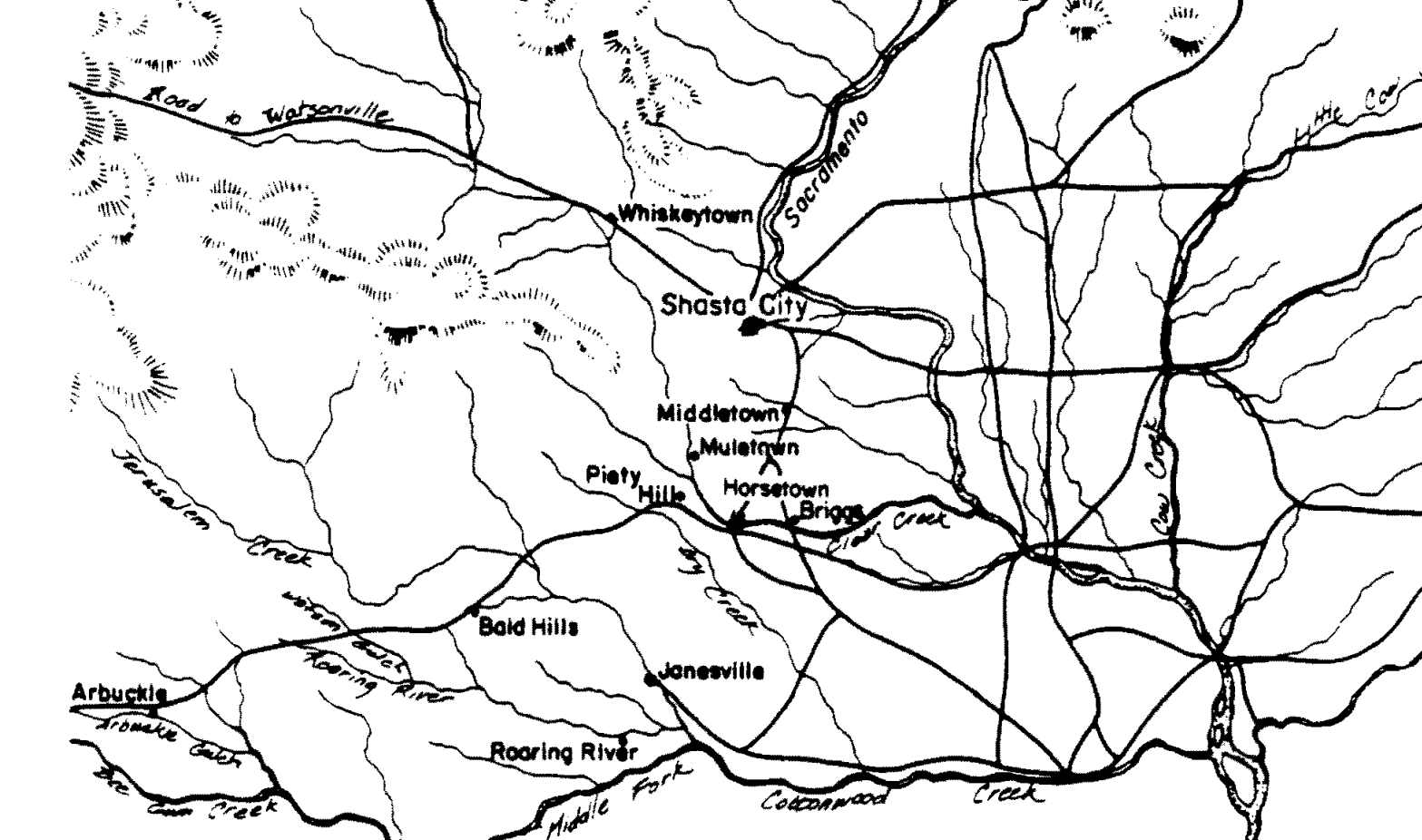
- Piety Hill, California on 1862 map

- Location within California Location within the United States
- 40.501000°N 122.523200°W
- Location: Cloverdale Road, Igo, California

History
- Built: 1849

Site notes
- Architect: 49er mining town

Piety Hill, California is a historical site on Cloverdale Road in Shasta County, near Igo, California, United States. The city was founded in 1849 as part of the California Gold Rush. Like many Gold Rush camps that became a town, the town grew quickly from a few miners to a town of 1,500. Near Piety Hill was a Chinatown of 600 that mined and farmed. The large-scale Hardscrabble mine opened in 1853. Mining requires much water and the Dry Creek Tunnel and Fluming Company both ran a water system, with a two-mile ditch, to the town and mines nearby, built with Chinese labor. In 1866 the Hardscrabble's hydraulic mining run off threatened the town. Many fled to nearby Igo. Hydraulic mining was outlawed in 1884 in the anti-debris act. The town ended in 1920 when the last two Chinese residents died.

The Dry Creek Tunnel and Fluming Company water right were transferred to the Happy Valley Land and Water Company that serves the Happy Valley area. There are no remains of this town today. The Piety Hill Loop is a 4.1-mile loop trail near Igo. A historical marker was placed near the town by the Ono Grange #445, E Clampus Vitus, Trintarianus Chapter # 62 and the Department of the Interior and Bureau of Land Management.

== See also ==
- California Historical Landmarks in Shasta County
- Bell's Bridge on Clear Creek
- Centerville, Shasta County, California just north of Reading's Bar
- Reading's Bar
