= Carr Fire =

2018 wildfire in Northern California

- Part of the 2018 California wildfires
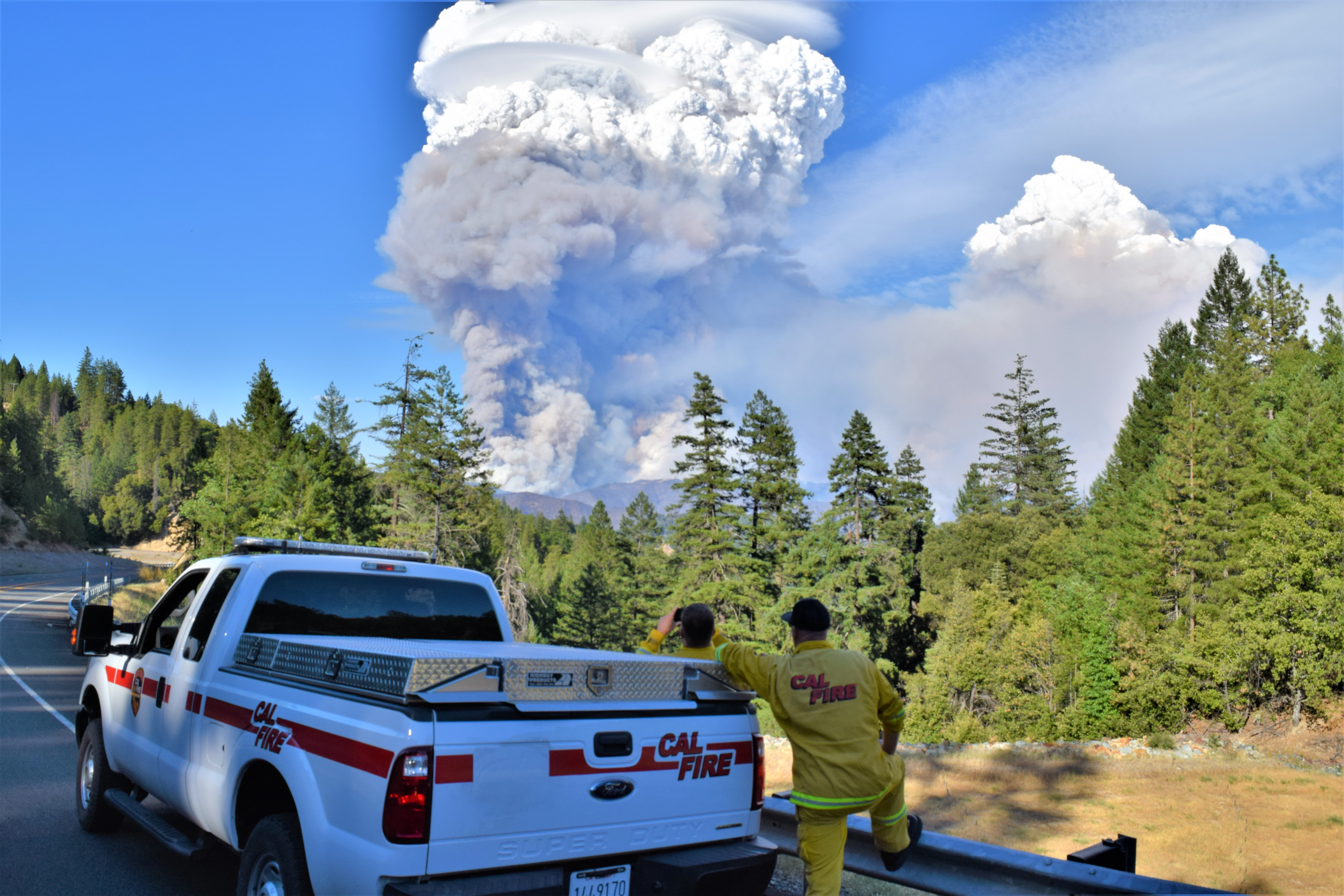
- The Carr Fire's smoke plume produces a large pyrocumulus cloud on July 26, 2018
- Date: July 23, 2018 –; August 30, 2018
- Location: Whiskeytown–Shasta–Trinity National Recreation Area, California, United States
- Coordinates: 40°39′44″N 122°37′43″W

Statistics
- Burned area: 229,651 acres (92,936 ha; 359 sq mi; 929 km^{2})

Impacts
- Deaths: 3 firefighters, 5 civilians
- Injuries: 11
- Structures lost: 1,604
- Cost: >$1.659 billion (2018 USD)

Ignition
- Cause: Sparks from tire failure of a vehicle

Map
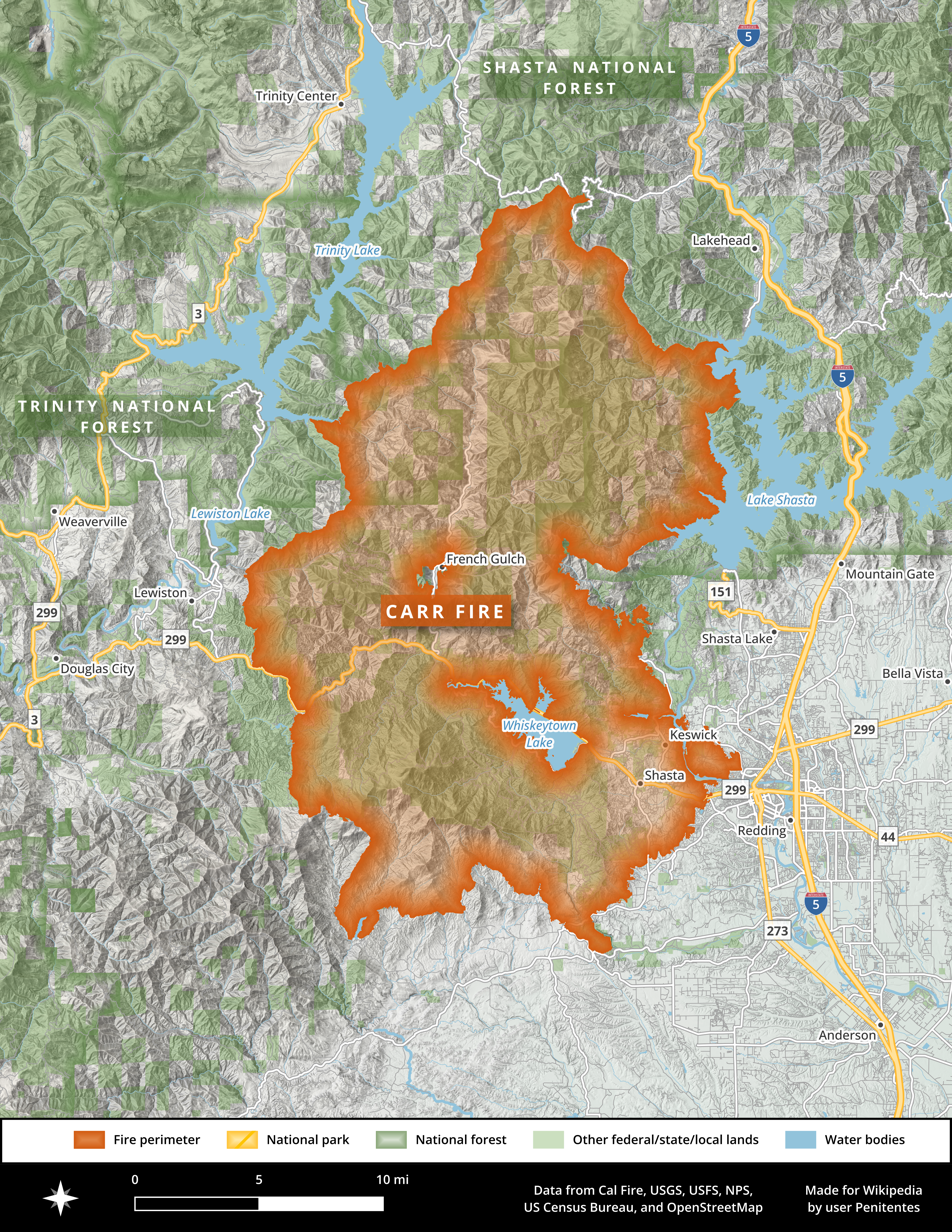
- The maximum extent of the Carr Fire

- Location of the fire in California

Point of ignition of Carr Fire

The Carr Fire was a large wildfire in 2018 in Northern California's Shasta and Trinity counties. The fire ignited on July 23 and burned 229,651 acres (92,936 hectares) before it was fully contained on August 30. The Carr Fire destroyed 1,604 structures, including more than a thousand homes, and damaged 277 others. At the time it was the sixth-most destructive fire in California history (now the ninth-most destructive fire), as well as the seventh-largest wildfire in recorded California history (now the fourteenth-largest). The Carr Fire cost over $1.659 billion (2018 USD), including $1.5 billion in insured losses and more than $158.7 million in suppression costs. At its height, the fire engaged as many as 4,766 personnel from multiple agencies.

The fire was reported on the afternoon of July 23, 2018, near the intersection of SR 299 and Carr Powerhouse Road in the Whiskeytown district of the Whiskeytown–Shasta–Trinity National Recreation Area. The fire was started when a flat tire on a vehicle caused the wheel's rim to scrape against the asphalt, creating sparks. On July 26, the fire jumped the Sacramento River, making its way into the city of Redding, causing the evacuation of 38,000 people. Evacuations also took place in Summit City, Keswick, Lewiston, Shasta Lake City, Igo, Ono, and French Gulch. Eight people died in the fire, including three firefighters.

== Progression ==
=== July ===
The Carr Fire was reported on the afternoon of July 23, 2018, at the intersection of SR 299 and Carr Powerhouse Road, in the Whiskeytown district of the Whiskeytown–Shasta–Trinity National Recreation Area, in Shasta County, California, near French Gulch. The fire was believed to have been started accidentally by a vehicle towing a dual-axle travel trailer. One of the tires on the trailer blew out, causing the steel rim to scrape along the pavement, generating sparks that ignited dry vegetation along the edge of the highway. Wind caused the fire to spread quickly. Hot conditions and steep, inaccessible terrain presented challenges for fire crews as they strengthened containment lines. SR 299 was closed, and French Gulch was placed under mandatory evacuation.

Overnight from July 25 to 26, the fire grew to 20,000 acres (8,094 ha) in total area burned. By the evening of July 26, the fire had burned 28,763 acres (11,640 ha) and was 10 percent contained. It was reported to have destroyed 15 buildings and damaged 5, while remaining a threat to 496 other buildings. The fire jumped the Sacramento River and portions of the western area of Redding were put under mandatory evacuation orders. Power to residents in North Redding was shut off by Redding Electric Utility. A state of emergency was declared by Governor Jerry Brown. The evacuation center at Shasta High School was relocated to Shasta College. A firefighter was killed while operating a bulldozer. The National Guard was called in to help fight the fire on the night of July 26.

The fire remained active overnight, with fire crews continuing to build containment lines. However, crews were stalled in their work due to the fire's extreme behavior. Just after midnight, evacuation orders were put in place for Shasta Dam, Summit City, and neighborhoods in western Redding. A second firefighter, Jeremy Stoke of the Redding Fire Department, was killed and it was reported that three firefighters from Marin County sustained burns. They were defending a structure when a heat blast from the flames came towards them. All three were released, with one being evaluated at the University of California, Davis Burn Center for burns on his face, hands, and ears.

By the evening of July 27, the fire had destroyed 500 structures and threatened almost 5,000. CrossPointe Community Church was named the third evacuation place. Amtrak announced that their Coast Starlight service would stop in Sacramento and Klamath Falls with alternative transportation being provided. Containment lines remained the priority for firefighters overnight. Red flag warnings and heat advisories were put in place for the area.

By the next morning, over 38,000 individuals had been evacuated. The Shasta College evacuation center reached capacity by July 28 and two more shelters operated by the Red Cross, and one at Grace Baptist Church, were opened. President Donald Trump declared a state of emergency for the state of California due to this fire and other fires burning in the state. The communities of Happy Valley and Anderson, as well as other areas, were put under mandatory evacuation in the mid-morning. A woman and two children, who were reported missing on July 26 due to the fire, were reported dead. More buildings were evaluated for damage, bringing the total up to 536 destroyed and 117 damaged. Winds were erratic, fueled by hot weather, which created spot fires throughout the fire area. Weaverville Elementary School was closed as an evacuation center and a new center was opened at Trinity High School. In the evening, new evacuation orders were put in place for SR 299 at Trinity Dam Road west to Douglas City and other nearby subdivisions.

A sixth fatality was reported on July 29, as the fire moved from densely populated areas and into rural parts of Shasta and Trinity Counties. The community of Lewiston was evacuated. By the evening, fire containment had grown from 5 to 17 percent. The National Guard was assigned to Redding to monitor for looting in evacuated neighborhoods. The next day, repopulation began of areas of western Redding, Shasta Lake, and Happy Valley that had previously been evacuated. Overnight, strengthening containment lines remained a priority as east and west winds converged and created challenges for firefighters. Repopulation efforts continued, starting on the morning of July 31 for areas of western Redding, Summit City, Buckeye, and Happy Valley. Celebrity chef Guy Fieri provided food for evacuees in Redding.

By the evening of July 31, the fire had burned 112,888 acres (45,684 ha) and was 30 percent contained. Crews were challenged by the fire along the western edge, where the fire burned in high terrain with strong winds and dry fuels.

==== Redding fire whirl ====
A powerful fire whirl with winds estimated in excess of 143 mph (230 km/h)—equivalent to an EF3 tornado—developed within the Carr Fire in Redding, California, on July 26. Remaining on the ground from 7:30–8:00 p.m., the fire whirl reached an estimated height of 18,000 ft (5,500 m) and caused extensive tornado-like damage while spreading the fire. The winds toppled transmission towers, shredded foliage, and debarked and uprooted trees. The smoke plume from the whirl dominated the site of the wildfire. Substantial damage occurred in areas untouched by fire, including signs of ground scouring. Three people were killed inside their Redding home after the structure's walls were blown out and the roof collapsed on the occupants. Several other homes suffered significant roof damage. A firefighter was also killed while driving near the fire whirl.

=== August ===
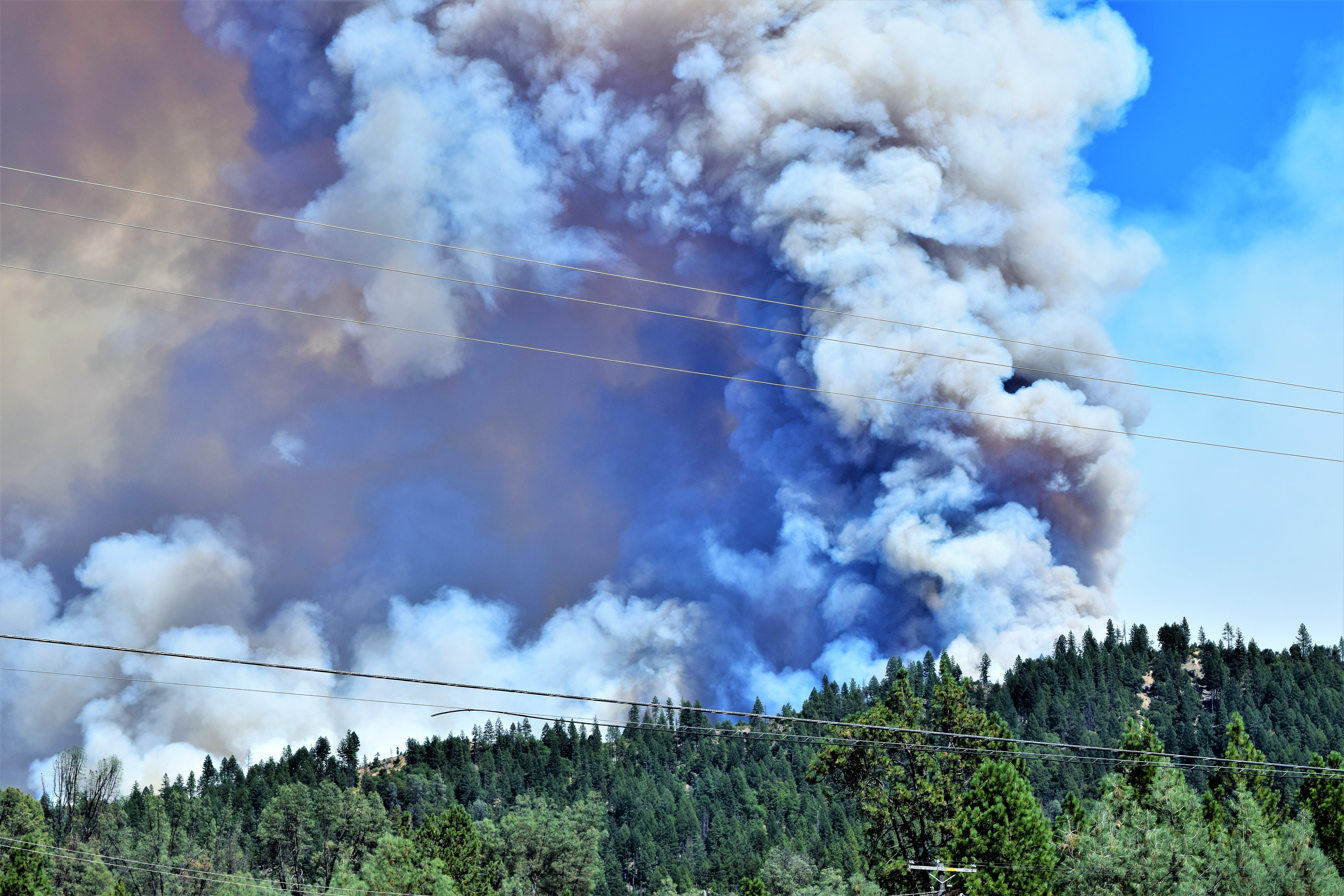
Smoke rising from the fire

The fire grew over 2,000 acres (809 ha) and to 35 percent containment, as the fire burned into August 1. Late morning, evacuation orders were lifted for the Mary Lake Subdivision and, later in the day, residents were allowed back to Plateau Road. The City of Redding shut down their Carr Fire-related missing persons hotline as all missing people were accounted for. Shasta College, which served as an evacuation center, resumed normal services. Six people were reported as arrested for alleged looting or illegally being in evacuated areas. The area west of Lakehead, California, was closed to public access to allow for fire crews' safety. Thus far, the fire had destroyed 1,546 structures, including 1,058 residential and 13 commercial.

On the morning of August 2, the fire covered 125,842 acres (50,926 ha) and remained 35 percent contained. Over 1,600 structures remained threatened, due to the fire. The Carr Fire continued to grow as the terrain, wind, and dry fuels continued to create challenges for fire crews. The Sunset West, Sunset Terrace, Ranch Land Acres, Middletown Park neighborhoods, and Centerville were reopened to population in the morning.

By August 4, the fire grew to 145,015 acres (58,685 ha) and to 41 percent containment. California Governor Jerry Brown toured the site and announced that he had requested a major disaster declaration, which provides federal assistance. Later that day, President Donald Trump approved the request for Shasta County. A seventh fatality was reported when a PG&E employee died in a vehicle incident.

By August 9, the fire grew to 178,752 acres (72,338 ha), with 49 percent containment. Early that morning, a Cal Fire heavy equipment mechanic was killed in a traffic incident, bringing the total number of fatalities to eight.

During the evening of August 30, the Carr Fire was reported to be 100% contained, at 229,651 acres (92,936 ha).

== Effects ==
The Carr Fire is the ninth-most destructive wildfire in California history. It caused evacuations of over 36,000 people in the communities of French Gulch, Igo, Ono, Lewiston, Douglas City, Shasta, Shasta Lake City, Summit City, and the City of Redding, and caused closures of portions of SR 299. The fire directly impacted the water sources Keswick Dam and Shasta Dam. The Carr Fire Pet Rescue and Reunification network was established after the fire was contained and coordinates with the Tubbs Fire Pet Rescue and Reunification network to help captured pets that were lost during evacuations.

=== Damage ===
The Shasta State Historic Park was also affected, where the 1920s schoolhouse was destroyed and other buildings were damaged. Artifacts had been removed before the fire.

=== Casualties ===
Two firefighters were killed in the Carr Fire. One was a contract firefighter, Donald Ray Smith, who was driving a bulldozer when he died. The second was Redding-based fire inspector Jeremy Stoke, who was killed in the fire whirl. On July 28, a great-grandmother and her two great-grandchildren were found dead, as they did not have a car and were unable to evacuate. A sixth fatality was reported on July 29. An evacuation order was issued to the victim, but they did not evacuate. The victim was recovering from heart surgery, which possibly prevented him from leaving. On August 4, a PG&E employee was killed in a vehicle incident. On August 9, a Cal Fire heavy equipment mechanic was killed in a traffic incident.

=== Closures and evacuations ===
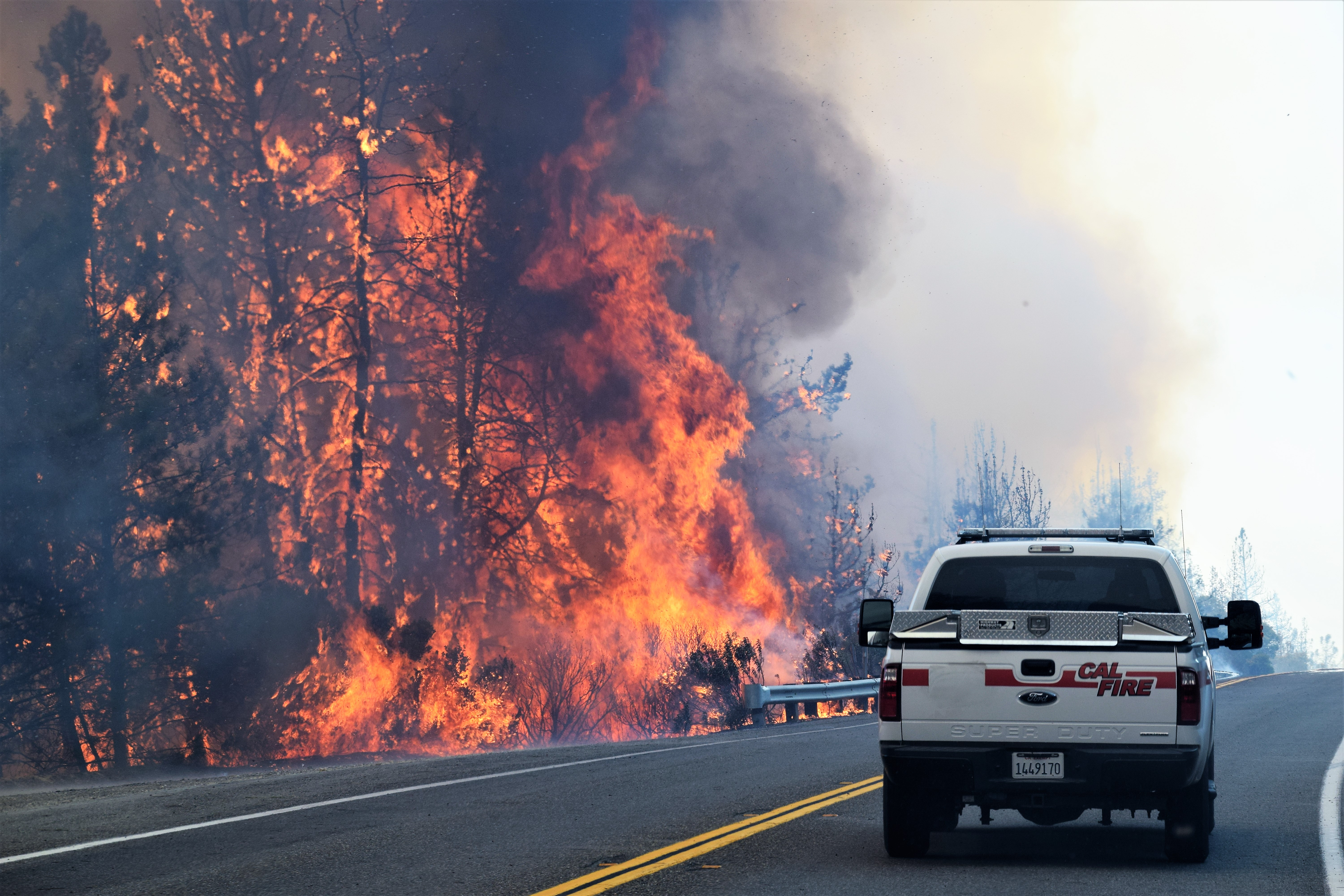
Many roads in the area were closed

The fire affected recreational activities. At early stages, access to Whiskeytown–Shasta–Trinity National Recreation Area was halted, specifically in Shasta County, including access to Whiskey Creek and Whiskeytown Lake. The area surrounding Shasta Dam and the dam's visitors center were evacuated and closed. Lake Redding Park and the adjacent golf course were closed due to the fire after it jumped the Sacramento River, destroying close to 40 homes in the surrounding neighborhood. The Bureau of Land Management closed trails in western Redding.

Amtrak service on the Coast Starlight was disrupted between Sacramento and Klamath Falls, Oregon. Amtrak arranged alternative transportation for travelers between those two cities.

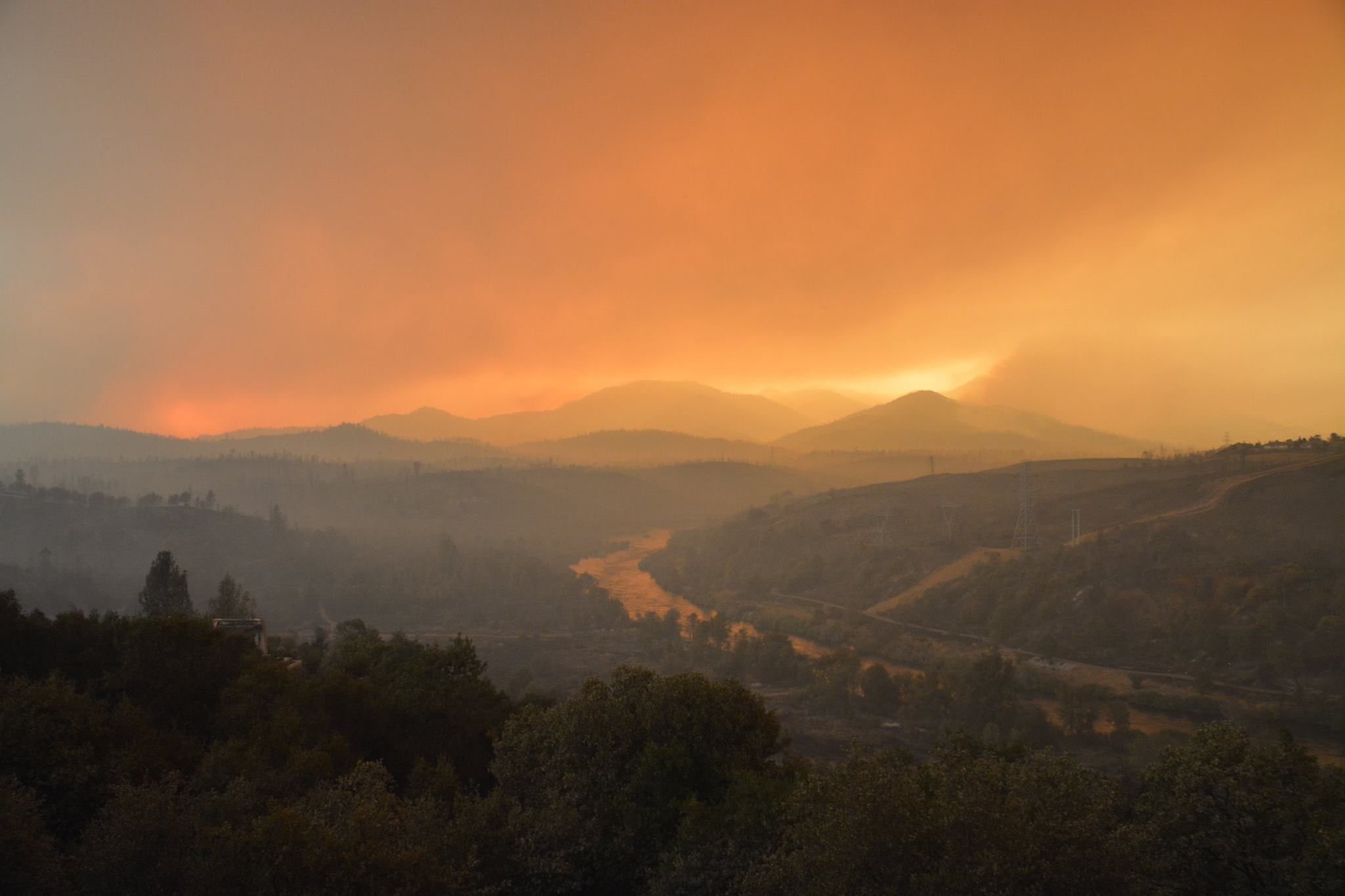
Thick smoke (seen here on July 28, 2018) limited visibility in large parts of Northern California at times

Large portions of SR 299 were closed as a result of the fire. Many sections of the highway's route through Redding were closed, including the North Market Street Bridge which connects downtown Redding to the Benton Tract neighborhood. SR 273 was closed in many areas.

Access to Keswick Dam was restricted and the surrounding areas were evacuated as a result of the fire.

Access to the remains of the historic ghost town of Gas Point was restricted due to the fire. A 2008 fire had destroyed the historic town. The historic town of French Gulch was evacuated and closed. This was the second time the community had been evacuated due to a fire, the prior evacuation taking place in August 2004, in which 103 structures burned in the community.

=== Environmental impacts ===
The fire affected air quality throughout Northern California and the Central Valley down to Bakersfield, Oregon, Washington and Nevada. Smoke reached as far north as Seattle, Washington, and Boise, Idaho.

== Fire growth and containment ==
Fire containment status Gray: contained; Red: active; %: percent contained;
Date	Area burned acres (hectares)	Containment
Jul 23	1,500 (607)	
Jul 24	3,126 (1,265)	
Jul 25	6,773 (2,741)	
Jul 26	28,763 (11,640)	
Jul 27	48,312 (19,551)	
Jul 28	83,800 (33,913)	
Jul 29	95,368 (38,594)	
Jul 30	103,772 (41,995)	
Jul 31	112,888 (45,684)	
Aug 1	121,049 (48,987)	
Aug 2	126,913 (51,360)	
Aug 3	133,924 (54,197)	
Aug 4	145,015 (58,685)	
Aug 5	160,049 (64,770)	
Aug 6	164,413 (66,536)	
Aug 7	172,055 (69,628)	
Aug 8	176,069 (71,253)	
Aug 9	178,752 (72,338)	
Aug 10	183,633 (74,314)	
Aug 11	190,873 (77,244)	
Aug 12	201,680 (81,617)	
Aug 13	206,816 (83,695)	
Aug 14	211,019 (85,396)	
Aug 15	214,527 (86,816)	
Aug 16	215,368 (87,156)	
Aug 17	223,610 (90,492)	
Aug 18	227,085 (91,898)	
Aug 19	227,098 (91,903)	
Aug 20	229,651 (92,936)	
Aug 21	229,651 (92,936)	
Aug 22	229,651 (92,936)	
Aug 23	229,651 (92,936)	
Aug 24	229,651 (92,936)	
Aug 25	229,651 (92,936)	
Aug 26	229,651 (92,936)	
Aug 27	229,651 (92,936)	
Aug 28	229,651 (92,936)	
Aug 29	229,651 (92,936)	
Aug 30	229,651 (92,936)	

== See also ==
- 2018 California wildfires
- List of California wildfires
- Hirz Fire – A wildfire that burned a few miles northeast of the Carr Fire
- Delta Fire – A wildfire that burned just east of the Carr Fire
- Camp Fire (2018) – The most destructive wildfire recorded in California
- Thomas Fire
