= Horsetown =

Horsetown may refer to:

- Horsetown, California, a ghost town
- Norco, California
