= Shasta, California =

Shasta
- census-designated place
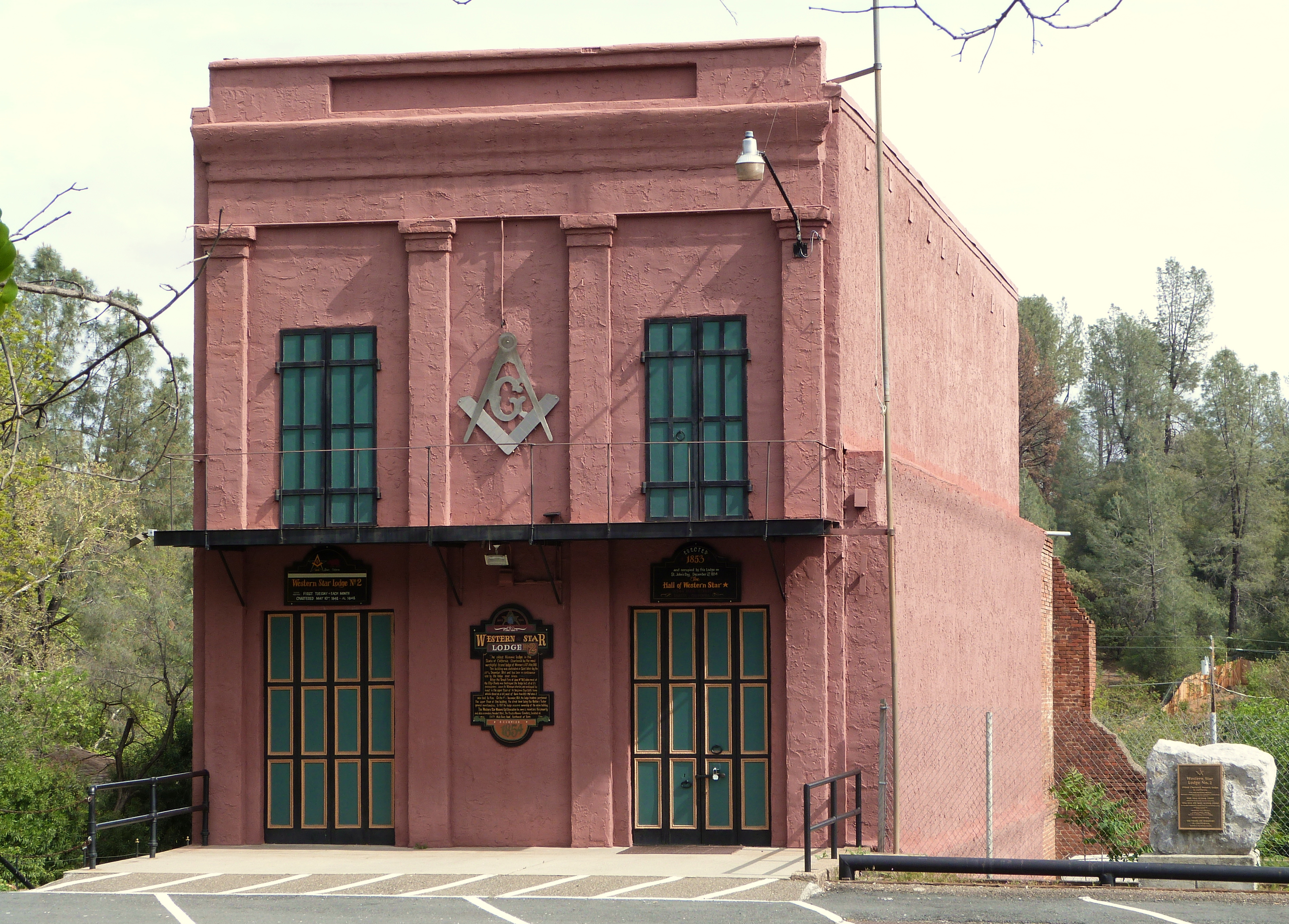
- Historic Masonic Hall

- Position in California. Shasta (the United States)
- Coordinates: 40°35′32″N 122°28′40″W
- Country: United States
- State: California
- County: Shasta

Area
  - Total: 10.941 sq mi (28.337 km^{2})
  - Land: 10.936 sq mi (28.325 km^{2})
  - Water: 0.0046 sq mi (0.012 km^{2}) 0.04%
- Elevation: 843 ft (257 m)

Population (2020)
  - Total: 1,043
  - Density: 95.37/sq mi (36.82/km^{2})
- Time zone: UTC-8 (Pacific (PST))
  - Summer (DST): UTC-7 (PDT)
- GNIS feature ID: 2583135
- Shasta State Historic Park
- U.S. National Register of Historic Places
- U.S. Historic district
- California Historical Landmark
- Location: Shasta, California
- NRHP reference No.: 71000199
- CHISL No.: 77

Significant dates
- Added to NRHP: October 14, 1971
- Designated CHISL: 1932

Shasta is a census-designated place (CDP) in Shasta County, California, United States. Shasta sits at an elevation of 843 feet (257 m). Its population is 1,043 as of the 2020 census, down from 1,771 from the 2010 census.

Shasta State Historic Park located at Shasta is a ghost town and California State Historic Park.

== History ==
A bustling town of the 1850s through the 1880s, Shasta was for its time, the largest settlement in Shasta County and the surrounding area. Sometimes referred to today as "Old Shasta", the town was an important commercial center and a major shipping point for mule trains and stagecoaches serving the mining towns and later settlements of northern California. The discovery of gold near Shasta in 1848 brought California Gold Rush-era Forty-Niners up the Siskiyou Trail in search of riches - most passed through Shasta, and continued to use it as base of operations. Those that stayed worked the placer gold diggings of nearby, short-lived camps like Horsetown, Buckeye, and Whiskeytown, California.

Situated about six miles (10 km) west of Redding, California along Highway 299, Shasta was once home to some 3,500 residents, the county seat, and a thriving commercial district. However, in 1873, the under construction Oregon-bound branch of the Central Pacific Railroad bypassed Shasta, in favor of Redding and the town began its decline into near "ghost town" status. In 1888, Shasta lost the county seat to Redding. By the twentieth century, and after several fires, a distinctive row of gold rush era buildings remained along its Main Street, which attracted preservationists and their efforts to save all the local stories and landscape, and the remaining first generation of 1850s brick and iron door architecture.

The poet Joaquin Miller refers to Shasta in his 1870s novel, Life Amongst the Modocs, based on the experiences of Miller as a young man living in the area in the 1850s. In this book, Miller describes his brief imprisonment in a Shasta jail for horse-stealing and subsequent escape with the aid of his Native American wife.

== Shasta State Historic Park ==
The site of the town is now a California State Historic Park called Shasta State Historic Park, containing many of the original 19th century brick buildings, partially restored. Shasta is now a town with the ruins of the gold mining town, a post office, a church, the oldest Masonic lodge in California, and a store.

The park was damaged by the Carr Fire in 2018, during which the elementary school was destroyed and the brewery and cemetery were damaged.

== Geography ==
According to the United States Census Bureau, the CDP covers an area of 10.9 square miles (28.3 km^{2}), of which 99.96% is land and 0.04% is water.

== Climate ==
According to the Köppen Climate Classification system, Shasta has a hot-summer mediterranean climate, abbreviated "Csa" on climate maps. The hottest temperature recorded in Shasta was 115 °F (46.1 °C) on July 28, 1976, and August 8, 1981, while the coldest temperature recorded was 14 °F (−10.0 °C) on December 21–22, 1990.

Climate data for Shasta Dam, California, 1991–2020 normals, extremes 1943–present
Month	Jan	Feb	Mar	Apr	May	Jun	Jul	Aug	Sep	Oct	Nov	Dec	Year
Record high °F (°C)	80 (27)	80 (27)	88 (31)	97 (36)	107 (42)	111 (44)	115 (46)	115 (46)	114 (46)	104 (40)	90 (32)	80 (27)	115 (46)
Mean maximum °F (°C)	66.3 (19.1)	71.5 (21.9)	78.3 (25.7)	86.3 (30.2)	93.7 (34.3)	101.6 (38.7)	106.3 (41.3)	105.3 (40.7)	101.7 (38.7)	91.9 (33.3)	76.3 (24.6)	65.3 (18.5)	108.0 (42.2)
Mean daily maximum °F (°C)	55.0 (12.8)	58.7 (14.8)	63.4 (17.4)	69.6 (20.9)	78.9 (26.1)	88.2 (31.2)	97.0 (36.1)	96.0 (35.6)	90.3 (32.4)	77.6 (25.3)	62.4 (16.9)	54.2 (12.3)	74.3 (23.5)
Daily mean °F (°C)	47.8 (8.8)	50.2 (10.1)	53.6 (12.0)	58.6 (14.8)	67.4 (19.7)	75.6 (24.2)	83.0 (28.3)	81.8 (27.7)	76.6 (24.8)	66.2 (19.0)	54.2 (12.3)	47.4 (8.6)	63.5 (17.5)
Mean daily minimum °F (°C)	40.5 (4.7)	41.7 (5.4)	43.9 (6.6)	47.6 (8.7)	55.4 (13.0)	63.0 (17.2)	69.0 (20.6)	67.7 (19.8)	63.0 (17.2)	54.8 (12.7)	46.0 (7.8)	40.6 (4.8)	52.8 (11.5)
Mean minimum °F (°C)	32.2 (0.1)	34.0 (1.1)	35.4 (1.9)	37.7 (3.2)	44.4 (6.9)	51.2 (10.7)	60.1 (15.6)	58.8 (14.9)	52.9 (11.6)	45.6 (7.6)	36.9 (2.7)	32.4 (0.2)	29.2 (−1.6)
Record low °F (°C)	19 (−7)	21 (−6)	25 (−4)	28 (−2)	35 (2)	38 (3)	50 (10)	44 (7)	43 (6)	34 (1)	30 (−1)	14 (−10)	14 (−10)
Average precipitation inches (mm)	10.51 (267)	11.41 (290)	9.24 (235)	4.61 (117)	2.93 (74)	1.51 (38)	0.14 (3.6)	0.16 (4.1)	0.52 (13)	3.43 (87)	6.59 (167)	11.99 (305)	63.04 (1,600.7)
Average precipitation days (≥ 0.01 in)	13.9	12.7	13.3	9.6	7.8	3.3	0.6	0.7	1.8	5.0	10.3	13.5	92.5
Source 1: NOAA
Source 2: National Weather Service

== Demographics ==
Historical population
Census	Pop.	Note	%±
2010	1,771		—
2020	1,043		−41.1%
U.S. Decennial Census; 2010

Shasta first appeared as a census designated place in the 2010 U.S. census.

=== 2020 census ===
As of the 2020 census, Shasta had a population of 1,043 and a population density of 95.4 inhabitants per square mile (36.8/km^{2}).

The age distribution was 181 people (17.4%) under the age of 18, 49 people (4.7%) aged 18 to 24, 187 people (17.9%) aged 25 to 44, 347 people (33.3%) aged 45 to 64, and 279 people (26.7%) who were 65 years of age or older. The median age was 54.0 years. For every 100 females, there were 111.6 males, and for every 100 females age 18 and over there were 107.2 males age 18 and over.

The census reported that 1,041 people (99.8% of the population) lived in households, 2 (0.2%) lived in non-institutionalized group quarters, and no one was institutionalized. In addition, 0.0% of residents lived in urban areas, while 100.0% lived in rural areas.

There were 413 households, out of which 119 (28.8%) had children under the age of 18 living in them. Of all households, 273 (66.1%) were married-couple households, 18 (4.4%) were cohabiting couple households, 54 (13.1%) had a female householder with no spouse or partner present, and 68 (16.5%) had a male householder with no spouse or partner present. 61 households (14.8%) were one person, and 33 (8.0%) were one person aged 65 or older. The average household size was 2.52, and there were 330 families (79.9% of all households).

There were 467 housing units at an average density of 42.7 units per square mile (16.5 units/km^{2}), of which 413 (88.4%) were occupied and 54 (11.6%) were vacant. Of occupied units, 341 (82.6%) were owner-occupied and 72 (17.4%) were occupied by renters. The homeowner vacancy rate was 3.4% and the rental vacancy rate was 0.0%.

Racial composition as of the 2020 census
Race	Number	Percent
White	894	85.7%
Black or African American	0	0.0%
American Indian and Alaska Native	27	2.6%
Asian	17	1.6%
Native Hawaiian and Other Pacific Islander	2	0.2%
Some other race	16	1.5%
Two or more races	87	8.3%
Hispanic or Latino (of any race)	56	5.4%

== Notable people ==
- Jim Hanks, actor, brother of Tom Hanks, was born in Shasta.
- Bronco Charlie Miller, horse trainer and Pony Express rider
- Scott Leary, swimmer

== See also ==
- French Gulch Historic District
- California Historical Landmarks in Shasta County
- Reading's Bar
