= Mary Lake (California) =

- Location within California Location within the United States
- Location: Shasta County, California
- Coordinates: 40°34′30″N 122°25′58″W
- Type: Reservoir
- Primary inflows: Jenny Creek
- Primary outflows: Jenny Creek
- Basin countries: United States
- Surface elevation: 722 ft (220 m)
- Settlements: Redding, California

Mary Lake is a small freshwater human-made lake in Redding, California, United States. It is located near the Mary Lake Subdivision on the west side of Redding off Buenaventura Boulevard. Its inflow and outflow is Jenny Creek, which flows into the Sacramento River.

Mary Lake was previously known as Falks Lake.

== Ecology ==
In 2001 the City of Redding lowered the lake, removed 2/3 of the dead trees and added microbes that compete naturally with algae growth, restoring the water to its picturesque appearance of years ago. In 2009, as many as five beaver living in the lake and Jenny Creek were violently killed, perhaps by rock throwing youths.

== See also ==
- List of lakes in California
