= Centerville, Shasta County, California =

Unincorporated community in California, United States

Centerville, California
- Unincorporated community Census-designated place
- Location within California Location within the United States
- Coordinates: 40°32′34.22″N 122°27′50.26″W
- Country: United States
- State: California
- County: Shasta

Area
  - Total: 8.105 sq mi (20.99 km^{2})
  - Land: 8.064 sq mi (20.89 km^{2})
  - Water: 0.041 sq mi (0.11 km^{2})
- Elevation: 873 ft (266 m)

Population (2020)
  - Total: 2,095
  - Density: 259.8/sq mi (100.3/km^{2})
- Time zone: UTC-8 (Pacific (PST))
  - Summer (DST): UTC-7 (PDT)
- Area code: 530
- GNIS feature ID: 2813348

Centerville is an unincorporated community and census-designated place (CDP) in Shasta County, California, United States. Centerville is 6.5 miles (10.5 km) southwest of Redding.

== History ==
The community was originally named Larkin after John Larkin, who owned a store and saloon in the community. A post office was located in the community from 1899 until 1912.

In 2018, the community was evacuated due to the Carr Fire, which destroyed homes in the community.

== Demographics ==
Historical population
Census	Pop.	Note	%±
2020	2,095		—
U.S. Decennial Census; 1850–1870 1880-1890; 1900 1910 1920; 1930 1940 1950; 1960 1970 1980; 1990 2000 2010

Centerville first appeared as a census designated place in the 2020 U.S. census.

=== 2020 Census ===
Centerville CDP (Shasta County) California – Racial and ethnic composition Note: the US Census treats Hispanic/Latino as an ethnic category. This table excludes Latinos from the racial categories and assigns them to a separate category. Hispanics/Latinos may be of any race.
Race / Ethnicity (NH = Non-Hispanic)	Pop 2020	% 2020
White alone (NH)	1,687	80.53%
Black or African American alone (NH)	8	0.38%
Native American or Alaska Native alone (NH)	24	1.15%
Asian alone (NH)	41	1.96%
Pacific Islander alone (NH)	1	0.05%
Other race alone (NH)	12	0.57%
Mixed race or Multiracial (NH)	156	7.45%
Hispanic or Latino (any race)	166	7.92%
Total	2,095	100.00%

== See also ==
- California Historical Landmarks in Shasta County
- Bell's Bridge
- Reading's Bar
