= Clear Creek (Sacramento River tributary) =

River in Shasta County, United States

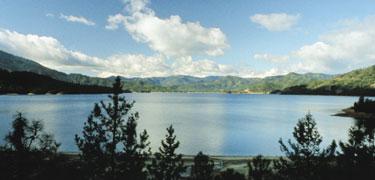
- Whiskeytown Lake on Clear Creek

Location
- Country: United States
- State: California
- Region: Shasta Trinity

Physical characteristics
- Source: Damnation Peak
  - location: Trinity Mountains, Shasta-Trinity National Forest
  - coordinates: 40°57′31″N 122°31′45″W
  - elevation: 5,080 ft (1,550 m)
- Mouth: Sacramento River
  - location: Girvan
  - coordinates: 40°30′20″N 122°22′04″W
  - elevation: 415 ft (126 m)
- Length: 60.6 mi (97.5 km)
- Basin size: 249 mi^{2} (640 km^{2})
- Discharge
  - location: French Gulch, above Whiskeytown Lake
  - average: 211 cu ft/s (6.0 m^{3}/s)
  - minimum: 2.07 cu ft/s (0.059 m^{3}/s)
  - maximum: 14,600 cu ft/s (410 m^{3}/s)

Basin features
- Tributaries
  - right: Crystal Creek, Brandy Creek

Clear Creek (Ínaam in Karuk) is a tributary of the upper Sacramento River in northern California.

== Geography ==
The creek is 60.6 miles (97.5 km) long, flowing in southern Siskiyou County and northern Shasta County. Clear Creek is the first major Sacramento River tributary downstream of the Shasta Dam.

Clear Creek originates in the Trinity Mountains, between Shasta Lake and Trinity Lake in the Shasta-Trinity National Forest, and flows into Whiskeytown Lake reservoir, impounded by Whiskeytown Dam. Past the reservoir, the stream bed continues south until its confluence with the Sacramento River. The Spring Creek Tunnel bypasses that section and delivers water from Whiskeytown Lake directly to Keswick Reservoir, both part of the Central Valley Project.

== California Historical Landmark ==
The site along Clear Creek where Pierson B. Reading discovered gold in 1848 was declared a California Historical Landmark No 78, on December 6, 1932, at 40.5922°N 122.4777°W. Reading's Bar in Clear Creek is also a California Historical Landmark, No. 32.

== See also ==
- California Historical Landmarks in Shasta County
- Reading Adobe
