= Whiskeytown Falls =

Waterfall in Northern California, In United States

Coordinates: 40°37′35″N 122°40′09″W

Whiskeytown Falls is a three-tiered waterfall with a total elevation of 220 feet (67 m), located in northern California's Whiskeytown National Recreation Area. Despite its size, it was largely unknown until 2005, having been improperly mapped decades before.

== See also ==
- List of waterfalls
- List of waterfalls in California
