= Gas Point, California =

Coordinates: 40°24′56″N 122°32′04″W

Gas Point () is a former unincorporated community and former ghost town in Shasta County, California, United States, on Cottonwood Creek. It was also known as Pinckney and Janesville and started as a 1849 California Gold Rush mining town after gold was found at Reading's Bar.

Gas Point, by then a true ghost town only visited occasionally by tourists, burned to the ground on April 8, 2008. The cause of the fire remains unknown.

== See also ==
- California Historical Landmarks in Shasta County
- Placer mining
