= Igo, California =

Unincorporated community in California, United States

- Unincorporated community Census-designated place
- Location in California Igo, California (the United States)
- Coordinates: 40°30′20″N 122°32′30″W
- Country: United States
- State: California
- County: Shasta

Area
  - Total: 1.017 sq mi (2.63 km^{2})
  - Land: 0.001 sq mi (0.0026 km^{2})
  - Water: 1.016 sq mi (2.63 km^{2})
- Elevation: 1,024 ft (312 m)

Population (2020)
  - Total: 103
  - Density: 100,000/sq mi (40,000/km^{2})
- Time zone: UTC-8 (Pacific)
  - Summer (DST): UTC-7 (PDT)
- GNIS feature ID: 225832

Igo is an unincorporated community and census-designated place (CDP) nine miles west of Redding, California, United States. Its population is 103 as of the 2020 census. Its ZIP Code is 96047. Wired Telephone numbers follow the pattern 530-396-xxxx. It has a neighboring town of Ono, which is four miles west of Igo. It is also home to the Northern California Veterans Cemetery, dedicated in December 2005. It has a post office, elementary school, general store, and a restaurant/banquet hall.

The name Igo may be derived from an unidentified Native American language. According to folk etymology, Igo was named from the question "I go?" frequently asked by a miner's son who liked to accompany his father to work. Igo was founded in 1849 as a mining town in the Igo-Ono Mining District.

== Politics ==
In the state legislature Igo is in the 1st Senate District, represented by Republican Ted Gaines, and in the 1st Assembly District, represented by Republican Brian Dahle.

Federally, Igo is in California's 1st congressional district, represented by Republican James Gallagher.

Igo, California, and its neighboring community Ono, share a community newsletter, the Umbrella available online at http://www.igoono.com/

== Climate ==
According to the Köppen Climate Classification system, Igo has a warm-summer Mediterranean climate, abbreviated "Csa" on climate maps.

== Demographics ==
Historical population
| Census | Pop. | Note | %± |
|---|---|---|---|
| 2020 | 103 | | — |
U.S. Decennial Census; 1850–1870 1880-1890; 1900 1910 1920; 1930 1940 1950; 1960 1970 1980; 1990 2000 2010 2020

Igo first appeared as a census designated place in the 2020 U.S. census.

=== 2020 Census ===
Igo CDP, California – Racial and ethnic composition Note: the US Census treats Hispanic/Latino as an ethnic category. This table excludes Latinos from the racial categories and assigns them to a separate category. Hispanics/Latinos may be of any race.
| Race / Ethnicity (NH = Non-Hispanic) | Pop 2020 | % 2020 |
|---|---|---|
| White alone (NH) | 103 | 75.73% |
| Black or African American alone (NH) | 1 | 0.97% |
| Native American or Alaska Native alone (NH) | 3 | 2.91% |
| Asian alone (NH) | 0 | 0.00% |
| Pacific Islander alone (NH) | 1 | 0.97% |
| Other race alone (NH) | 0 | 0.00% |
| Mixed race or Multiracial (NH) | 14 | 13.59% |
| Hispanic or Latino (any race) | 6 | 5.83% |
| Total | 103 | 100.00% |

== See also ==
- California Historical Landmarks in Shasta County
- Bell's Bridge (California)
- Reading's Bar
