= French Gulch, California =

French Gulch
- Unincorporated Community; Census Designated Place
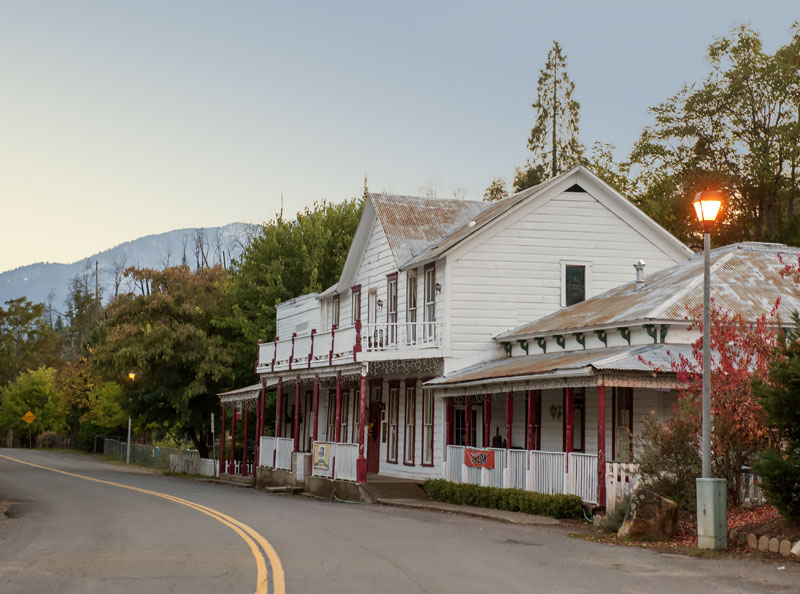

- Location in Shasta County and the state of California
- Coordinates: 40°42′19″N 122°38′7″W
- Country: United States
- State: California
- County: Shasta

Area
  - Total: 12.369 sq mi (32.035 km^{2})
  - Land: 12.332 sq mi (31.940 km^{2})
  - Water: 0.037 sq mi (0.095 km^{2}) 0.30%
- Elevation: 1,394 ft (425 m)

Population (2020)
  - Total: 373
  - Density: 30.2/sq mi (11.7/km^{2})
- Time zone: UTC-8 (Pacific (PST))
  - Summer (DST): UTC-7 (PDT)
- ZIP code: 96033
- Area code(s): 530, 837
- FIPS code: 06-26056
- GNIS feature ID: 0223907

California Historical Landmark
- Reference no.: 166

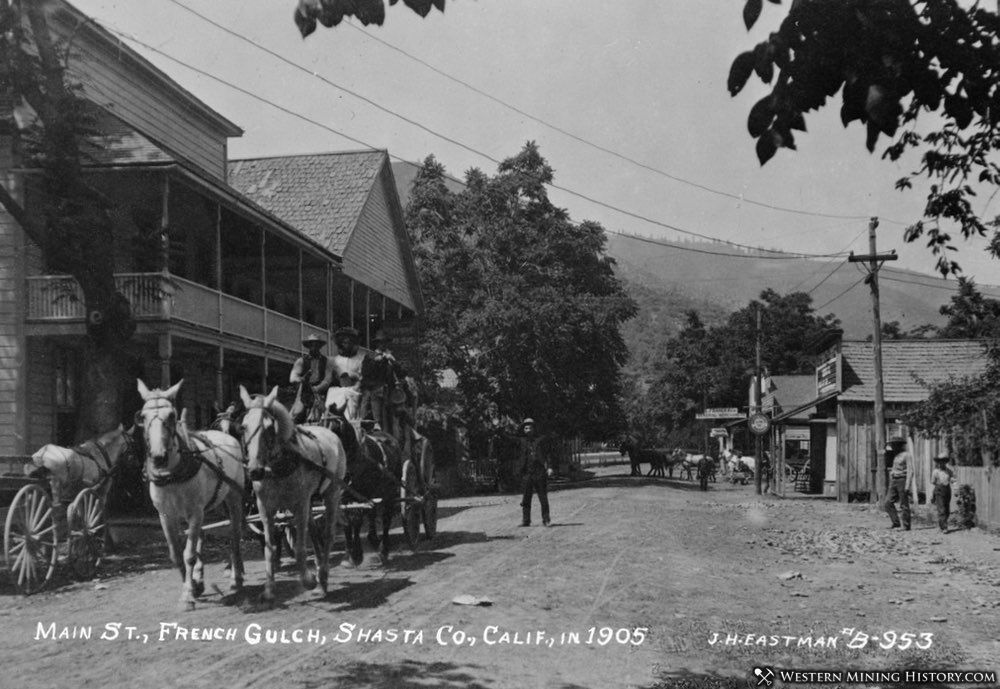
Main Street in French Gulch, 1905

French Gulch is a census-designated place (CDP) in Shasta County, California, United States. Its population is 373 as of the 2020 census, up from 346 from the 2010 census.

== History ==
French Gulch was founded by French miners in 1849 and became one of California's major gold producing areas. The town became a major supply place when it became the terminus of the western branch of the California Trail. French Gulch was registered as a California Historical Landmark in 1935.

French Gulch was an important, early, hard rock mining district. The Washington vein system was discovered in 1852, and was worked periodically through about 1914. It is estimated to have produced about 100,000 ounces of gold. The Niagara Mine is estimated to have produced about 50,000 ounces from its past operations. As of 2008, limited production has resumed from the Washington and Niagara mines.

On August 14, 2004, the entire town of French Gulch was evacuated due to a forest fire which roared out of control through much of Shasta County. The fire burned 13,005 acres and destroyed 26 residences, 1 commercial building, and 76 outbuildings. The evacuation lasted 3 days, allowing residents to return home on August 17, 2004. A total of 1,345 fire personnel helped get the blaze under control. The cause was never determined.

On July 22, 2018, French Gulch was evacuated due to the Carr Fire, which was started by a motor vehicle malfunction. As of August 2, air and ground crews continued to work in the area to protect the town from the fire, and many of the buildings, including the historic hotel, were still standing. On August 8, the evacuation order for French Gulch and surrounding areas was lifted, and residents were allowed to return to their homes.

== Geography ==
French Gulch is located at 40°42′19″N 122°38′7″W (40.705313, -122.635174). Lying a few miles northwest of Whiskeytown Lake, the hamlet lies along Trinity Mountain Road going north from California State Route 299, with the town center approximately three miles north of 299, and about 19 highway-miles from downtown Redding.

According to the United States Census Bureau, the CDP has a total area of 12.4 square miles (32 km^{2}), of which 99.70% is land and 0.30% is water.

== Climate ==
Climate data for Coulterville, California
Month	Jan	Feb	Mar	Apr	May	Jun	Jul	Aug	Sep	Oct	Nov	Dec	Year
Mean daily maximum °F (°C)	50 (10)	55 (13)	60 (16)	67 (19)	76 (24)	85 (29)	94 (34)	94 (34)	88 (31)	74 (23)	58 (14)	49 (9)	71 (21)
Mean daily minimum °F (°C)	34 (1)	35 (2)	37 (3)	40 (4)	47 (8)	53 (12)	59 (15)	59 (15)	52 (11)	45 (7)	38 (3)	34 (1)	44 (7)
Average precipitation inches (mm)	7.8 (200)	7.6 (190)	6.4 (160)	3.8 (97)	2.5 (64)	0.9 (23)	0.1 (2.5)	0.1 (2.5)	0.5 (13)	2.5 (64)	4.8 (120)	7.9 (200)	44.9 (1,136)
Average snowfall inches (cm)	1.9 (4.8)	0.9 (2.3)	0.4 (1.0)	0.0 (0.0)	0.0 (0.0)	0.0 (0.0)	0.0 (0.0)	0.0 (0.0)	0.0 (0.0)	0.0 (0.0)	0.4 (1.0)	1.8 (4.6)	5.4 (13.7)
Source: prism

== Demographics ==
Historical population
Census	Pop.	Note	%±
2000	254		—
2010	346		36.2%
2020	373		7.8%
U.S. Decennial Census; 1860–1870 1880-1890; 1900 1910 1920; 1930 1940 1950; 1960 1970 1980; 1990 2000 2010

French Gulch first appeared as a census designated place in the 2000 U.S. census.

=== 2020 ===
The 2020 United States census reported that French Gulch had a population of 373. The population density was 30.2 inhabitants per square mile (11.7/km^{2}). The racial makeup of French Gulch was 321 (86.1%) White, 4 (1.1%) African American, 2 (0.5%) Native American, 5 (1.3%) Asian, 0 (0.0%) Pacific Islander, 14 (3.8%) from other races, and 27 (7.2%) from two or more races. Hispanic or Latino of any race were 19 persons (5.1%).

The whole population lived in households. There were 157 households, out of which 16 (10.2%) had children under the age of 18 living in them, 69 (43.9%) were married-couple households, 10 (6.4%) were cohabiting couple households, 38 (24.2%) had a female householder with no partner present, and 40 (25.5%) had a male householder with no partner present. 60 households (38.2%) were one person, and 26 (16.6%) were one person aged 65 or older. The average household size was 2.38. There were 90 families (57.3% of all households).

The age distribution was 76 people (20.4%) under the age of 18, 10 people (2.7%) aged 18 to 24, 50 people (13.4%) aged 25 to 44, 152 people (40.8%) aged 45 to 64, and 85 people (22.8%) who were 65 years of age or older. The median age was 55.3 years. For every 100 females, there were 110.7 males.

There were 173 housing units at an average density of 14.0 units per square mile (5.4 units/km^{2}), of which 157 (90.8%) were occupied. Of these, 135 (86.0%) were owner-occupied, and 22 (14.0%) were occupied by renters.

=== 2010 ===
At the 2010 census French Gulch had a population of 346. The population density was 28.0 inhabitants per square mile (10.8/km^{2}). The racial makeup of French Gulch was 296 (85.5%) White, 3 (0.9%) African American, 15 (4.3%) Native American, 3 (0.9%) Asian, 1 (0.3%) Pacific Islander, 8 (2.3%) from other races, and 20 (5.8%) from two or more races. Hispanic or Latino of any race were 17 people (4.9%).

The whole population lived in households, no one lived in non-institutionalized group quarters and no one was institutionalized.

There were 147 households, 32 (21.8%) had children under the age of 18 living in them, 71 (48.3%) were opposite-sex married couples living together, 12 (8.2%) had a female householder with no husband present, 10 (6.8%) had a male householder with no wife present. There were 13 (8.8%) unmarried opposite-sex partnerships, and 0 (0%) same-sex married couples or partnerships. 42 households (28.6%) were one person and 16 (10.9%) had someone living alone who was 65 or older. The average household size was 2.35. There were 93 families (63.3% of households); the average family size was 2.80.

The age distribution was 64 people (18.5%) under the age of 18, 23 people (6.6%) aged 18 to 24, 54 people (15.6%) aged 25 to 44, 141 people (40.8%) aged 45 to 64, and 64 people (18.5%) who were 65 or older. The median age was 49.6 years. For every 100 females, there were 104.7 males. For every 100 females age 18 and over, there were 102.9 males.

There were 166 housing units at an average density of 13.4 per square mile, of the occupied units 119 (81.0%) were owner-occupied and 28 (19.0%) were rented. The homeowner vacancy rate was 3.2%; the rental vacancy rate was 6.7%. 284 people (82.1% of the population) lived in owner-occupied housing units and 62 people (17.9%) lived in rental housing units.

== Politics ==
In the state legislature French Gulch is in the 1st senatorial district, represented by Republican Megan Dahle, and the 1st Assembly district, represented by Republican Heather Hadwick.

Federally, French Gulch is in California's 1st congressional district, represented by Republican James Gallagher.

== See also ==
- French Gulch Historic District
- California Historical Landmarks in Shasta County
- Reading's Bar
