= Whiskeytown Lake =

Man-made reservoir in California, United States

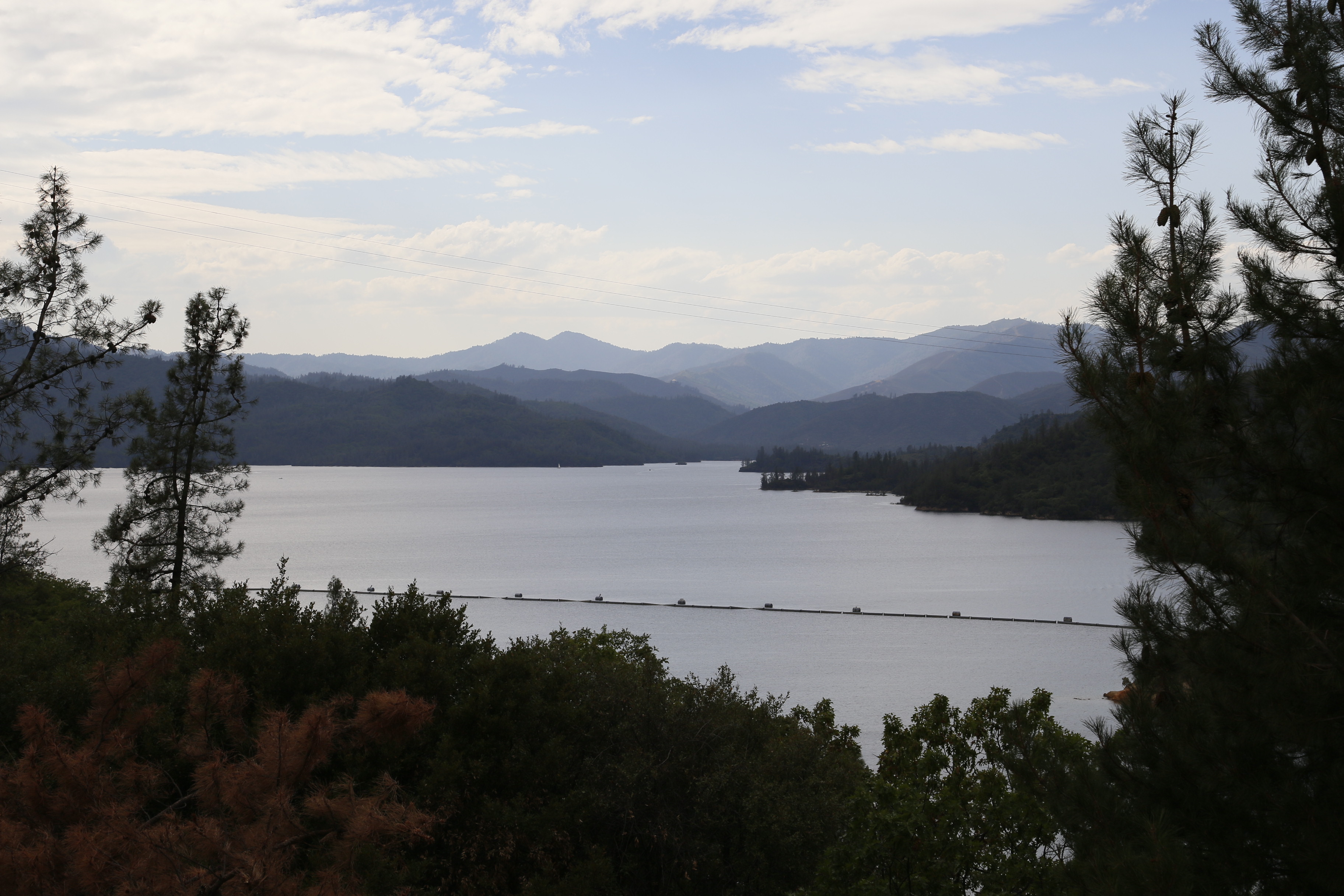

- Location within California Location within the United States
- Location: Shasta County, California
- Coordinates: 40°35′58″N 122°32′28″W
- Type: reservoir
- Primary inflows: Clear Creek
- Primary outflows: Clear Creek
- Catchment area: 203 sq mi (530 km^{2})
- Basin countries: United States
- Surface area: 3,458 acres (1,399 ha)
- Water volume: 241,100 acre⋅ft (297.4 Gl)
- Surface elevation: 366 m (1,201 ft)

Whiskeytown Lake is a reservoir in Shasta County in northwestern California, United States, about 8 miles (13 km) west of Redding. The lake is in the Whiskeytown Unit of the Whiskeytown-Shasta-Trinity National Recreation Area.

Whiskeytown Lake has a capacity of 241,100 acre⋅ft (297.4 Gl) and is formed by Whiskeytown Dam on Clear Creek. Additional water comes from Lewiston Reservoir, supplied by the Trinity River, via the Clear Creek Tunnel, which comes from the bottom of Lewiston Lake.

The California Office of Environmental Health Hazard Assessment has issued a safe eating advisory for any fish caught in the Whiskeytown Lake due to elevated levels of mercury.

== Recreation ==
There are recreational activities available at the lake, including camping, swimming, boating, water skiing and fishing. However, personal water craft have been banned from the lake. Fishing opportunities include rainbow and German brown trout; largemouth, smallmouth, and spotted bass; and kokanee salmon.

Whiskeytown is favored by locals because of the 30 ft (9.1 m) visibility of its waters, and wildlife that surround the lake. There are numerous breeding pairs of bald eagles that nest on the lake's shores. Sharing the habitat are black bears, mountain lions, blacktail deer, turtles and raccoons, among other wildlife. It is mandated that the lake be at full capacity by Memorial Day, and remain full until Labor Day.

== Whiskeytown Dam ==
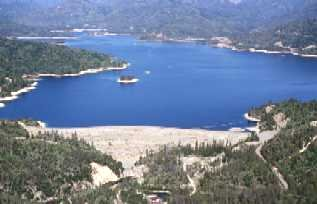
Whiskeytown Dam and Reservoir

Whiskeytown Dam, an earth-fill embankment dam, is 263 ft (80 m), and was completed in 1963. It is owned and operated by the United States Bureau of Reclamation. Its purpose is to provide flood control, water for irrigation, and electricity generation.

=== Powerhouse ===
Before entering the lake, the water generates hydroelectricity at the 154 MW Judge Francis Carr Powerhouse. Whiskey Creek also empties into the lake. A large portion of the lake's water leaves through the Spring Creek Tunnel, which delivers the water to the 180-MW Spring Creek Powerhouse, whose tailrace empties into Keswick Reservoir. The 117-MW Keswick Powerhouse at Keswick Dam empties into the Sacramento River. Most of the electricity produced by the three powerhouses supplies Redding's municipal electric utility, as well as other municipal electric utilities in Northern California, with the remainder offered into the California Independent System Operator's markets for purchase by load-serving entities throughout the state.

== Climate ==
Whiskeytown Reservoir is one of several places in northern California to register a temperature of 120 °F or above (some others include Red Bluff and Orland).

Climate data for Whiskeytown Reservoir, CA
Month	Jan	Feb	Mar	Apr	May	Jun	Jul	Aug	Sep	Oct	Nov	Dec	Year
Record high °F (°C)	79 (26)	82 (28)	92 (33)	97 (36)	104 (40)	111 (44)	113 (45)	115 (46)	120 (49)	104 (40)	93 (34)	81 (27)	120 (49)
Mean daily maximum °F (°C)	53.4 (11.9)	57.1 (13.9)	61.9 (16.6)	67.8 (19.9)	77.9 (25.5)	86.6 (30.3)	95.8 (35.4)	95.5 (35.3)	89.0 (31.7)	76.6 (24.8)	60.4 (15.8)	52.9 (11.6)	72.9 (22.7)
Mean daily minimum °F (°C)	36.2 (2.3)	38.0 (3.3)	40.9 (4.9)	44.5 (6.9)	52.2 (11.2)	59.0 (15.0)	64.0 (17.8)	62.6 (17.0)	57.9 (14.4)	50.2 (10.1)	41.7 (5.4)	36.4 (2.4)	48.6 (9.2)
Record low °F (°C)	21 (−6)	18 (−8)	26 (−3)	28 (−2)	32 (0)	39 (4)	47 (8)	47 (8)	41 (5)	28 (−2)	25 (−4)	11 (−12)	11 (−12)
Average precipitation inches (mm)	11.16 (283)	10.05 (255)	9.49 (241)	4.65 (118)	2.64 (67)	1.06 (27)	0.34 (8.6)	0.28 (7.1)	1.00 (25)	3.11 (79)	8.74 (222)	10.72 (272)	63.24 (1,604.7)
Average snowfall inches (cm)	1.7 (4.3)	0.3 (0.76)	0.2 (0.51)	0 (0)	0 (0)	0 (0)	0 (0)	0 (0)	0 (0)	0 (0)	0.4 (1.0)	0.5 (1.3)	3.1 (7.87)
Source: http://www.wrcc.dri.edu/cgi-bin/cliMAIN.pl?ca9621

== See also ==
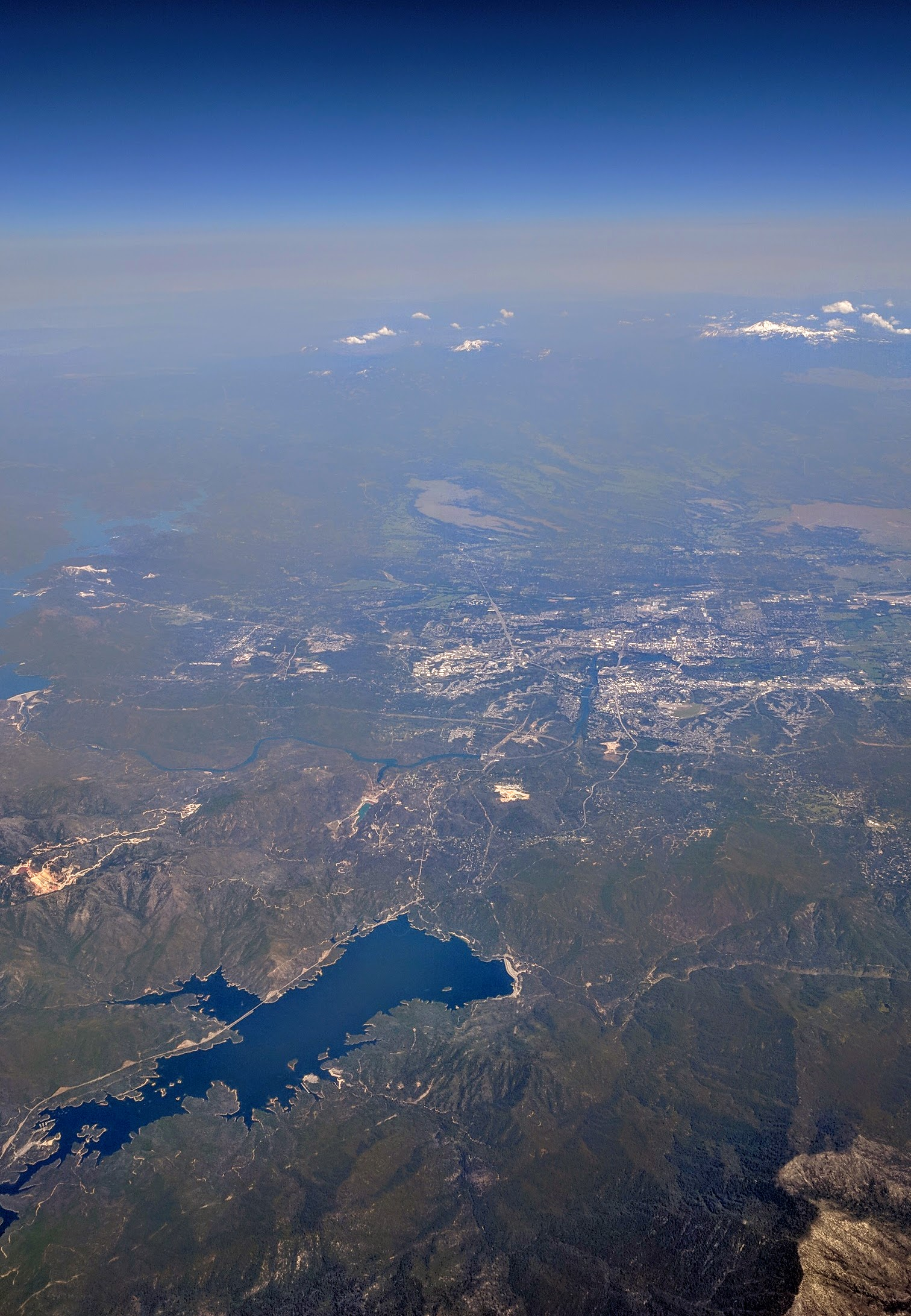
Aerial view of Whiskeytown Lake and Redding, California

- List of dams and reservoirs in California
- List of lakes in California
- List of largest reservoirs of California
- Carr Fire, a major wildfire that burned all the way around the lake
