= Whiskeytown–Shasta–Trinity National Recreation Area =

National recreation area in California, United States

- IUCN category V (protected landscape/seascape)
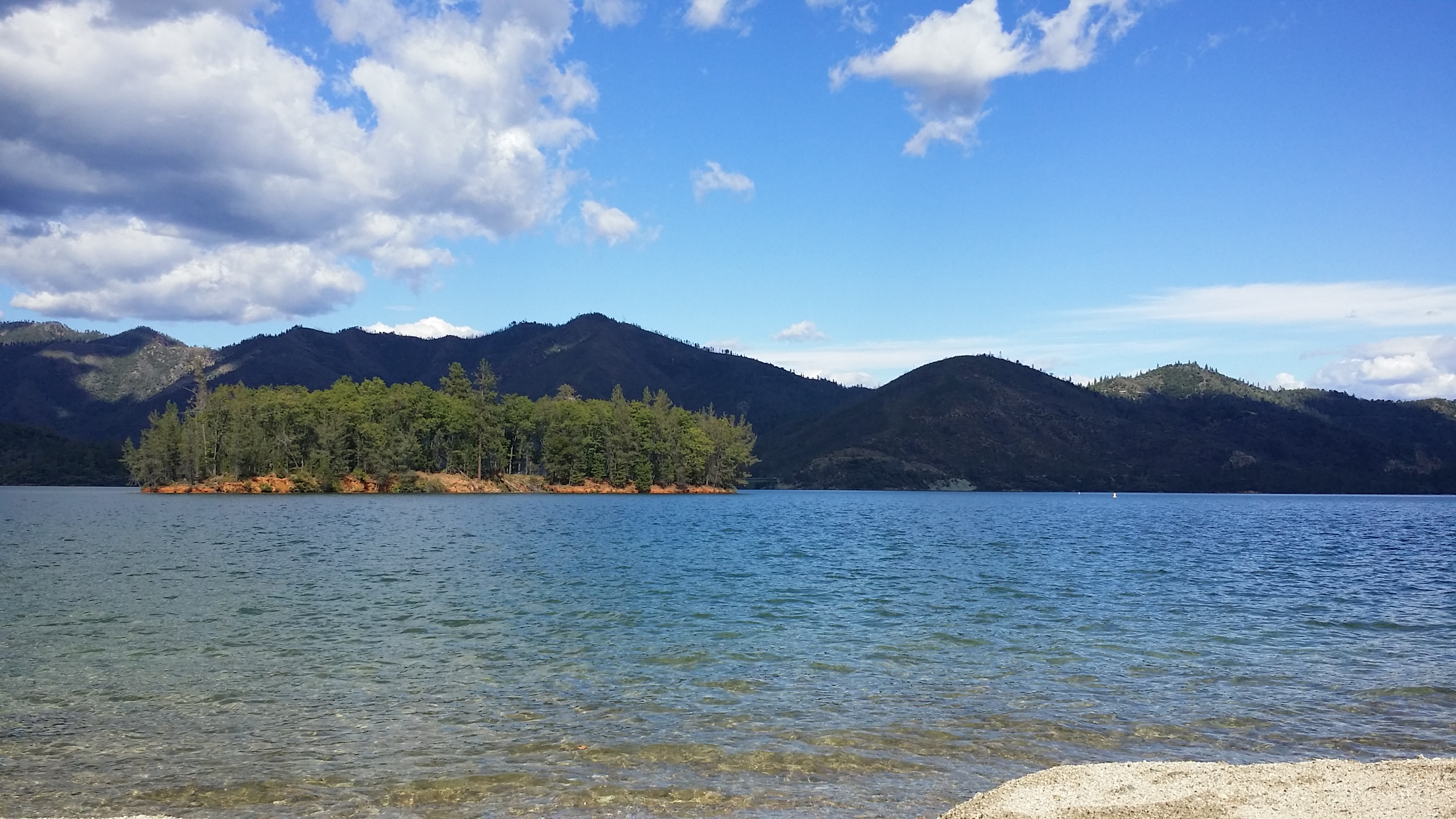
- Whiskeytown Lake

- Location within California Location within the United States
- Interactive map of Whiskeytown–Shasta–Trinity National Recreation Area
- Location: Shasta County & Trinity County, California, United States
- Nearest city: Redding, California
- Coordinates: 40°37′31″N 122°33′34″W
- Area: 203,587 acres (82,389 ha)
- Established: November 8, 1965
- Visitors: 1,505,134 (Whiskeytown only) (in 2022)
- Governing body: National Park Service, United States Forest Service
- Website: Whiskeytown National Recreation Area

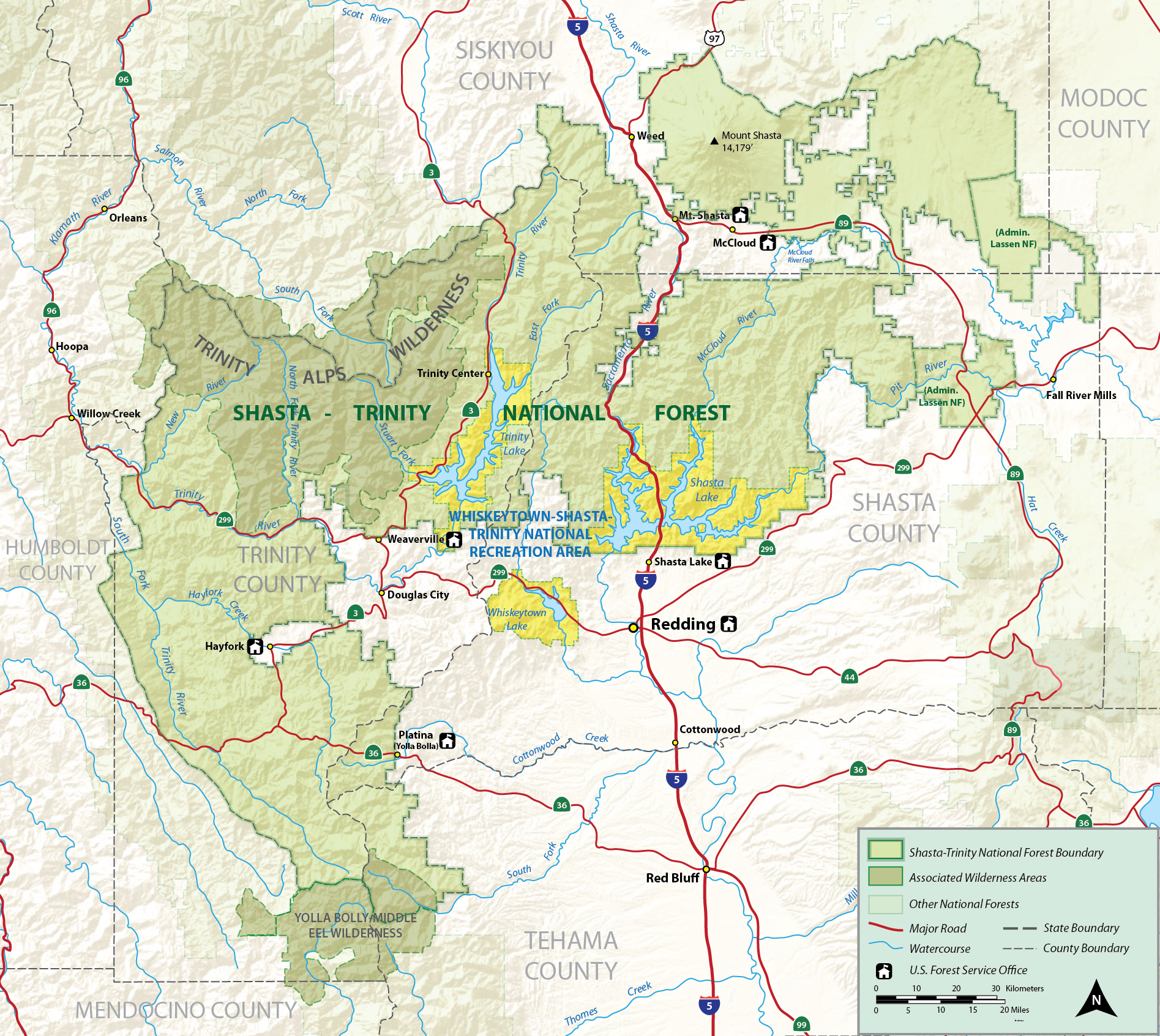
Map of the Shasta-Trinity National Forest and Whiskeytown–Shasta–Trinity National Recreation Area (in yellow)

The Whiskeytown–Shasta–Trinity National Recreation Area is a United States National Recreation Area in northern California. The recreation area was authorized in 1965 by the United States Congress. Recreational activities available include swimming, fishing, boating, camping, and hiking.

The Whiskeytown–Shasta–Trinity National Recreation Area (WST-NRA) has a total of 246,087 acres (99,588 ha) of land, which is divided into the Shasta, Trinity, and Whiskeytown Units. The Shasta–Trinity National Forest surrounds the Shasta and Trinity units, so they are managed by the United States Forest Service. The National Park Service manages the Whiskeytown unit.

Each of the units encompasses a large reservoir (man-made lake) and its surrounding natural features, habitats, and terrain. The WST-NRA has interesting wildlife viewing opportunities, including over sixty pairs of osprey, thirty pairs of nesting bald eagles, other resident and migrating birds, and deer and bear populations.

Plant communities include Riparian, Interior chaparral, Blue oak grasslands, Mixed oak woodlands, and Knobcone pine, Ponderosa pine, or mixed evergreen forests.

== Forest Service areas ==
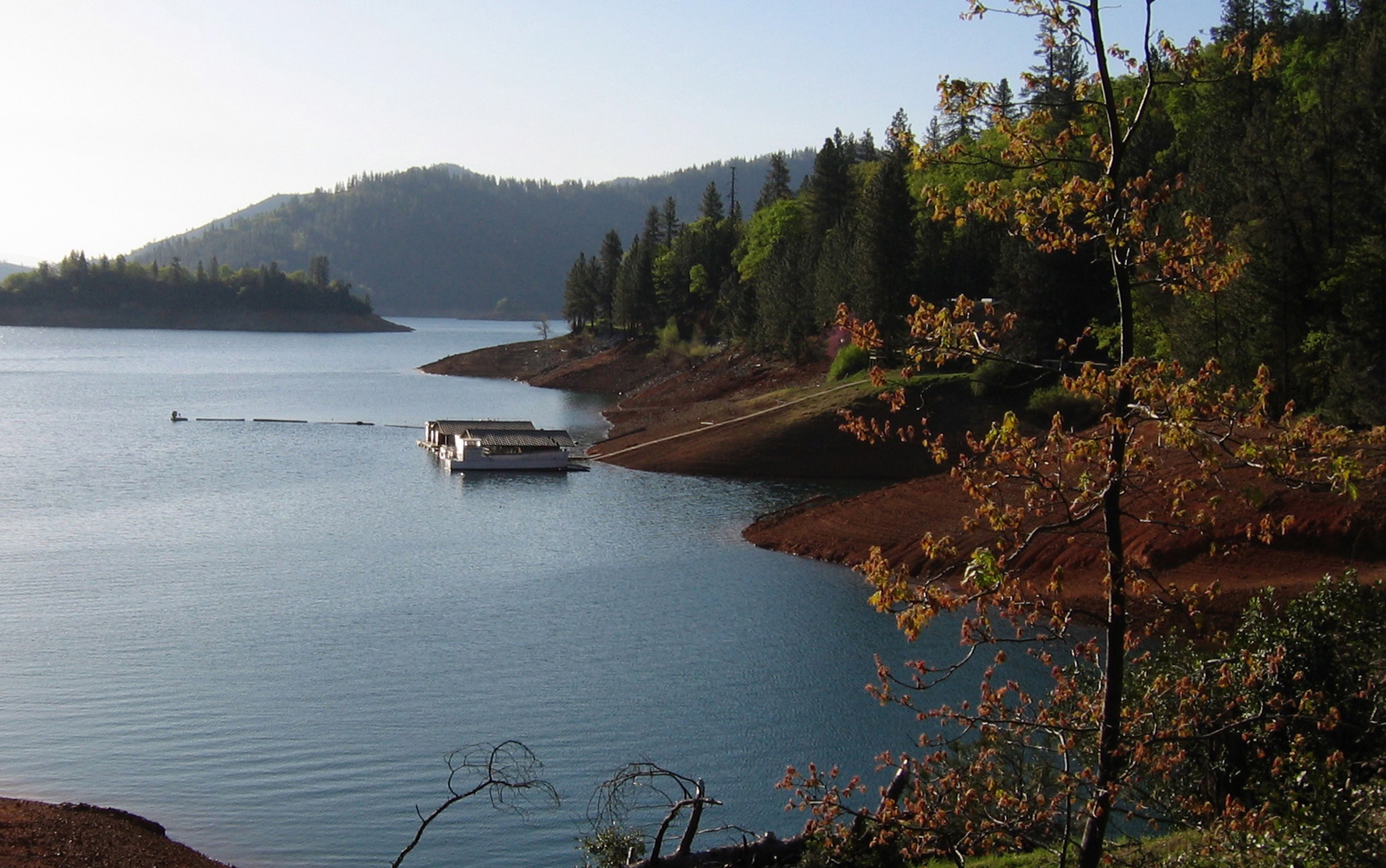
Dock at Lake Shasta.

Of the eighteen National Recreation Areas under Forest Service management in the U.S., the Shasta–Trinity Units are somewhat unusual, being made up of three large reservoir lakes set in scenic and protected foothill locales with diverse recreation opportunities. The Shasta-Trinity National Recreation Area section of the Whiskeytown–Shasta–Trinity National Recreation Area, has 203,587 acres (82,389 ha) managed by the Shasta–Trinity National Forest. It includes Shasta, Trinity, and Lewiston Lakes and their surrounding natural areas.

=== Trinity Unit ===
The Trinity Unit, centered on Trinity Lake and Lewiston Lake, has four subunits: the Lewiston Lake, Trinity Dam, Stuart Fork, and North Lake Units. They offer many opportunities for recreation, including trout fishing in Lewiston Lake, scenic driving on the Trinity Heritage National Scenic Byway, picnicking, camping, and hiking/riding on the multi-use trail system.

The Trinity Dam Unit has Trinity Lake reservoir, that when full has 145 miles (233 km) of shoreline, contains 17,000 acres (6,900 ha), and holds 2,500,000 acre-feet (3,100 Gl) of water. Trinity Dam is one of the highest earth filled dams in the world.

=== Shasta Unit ===
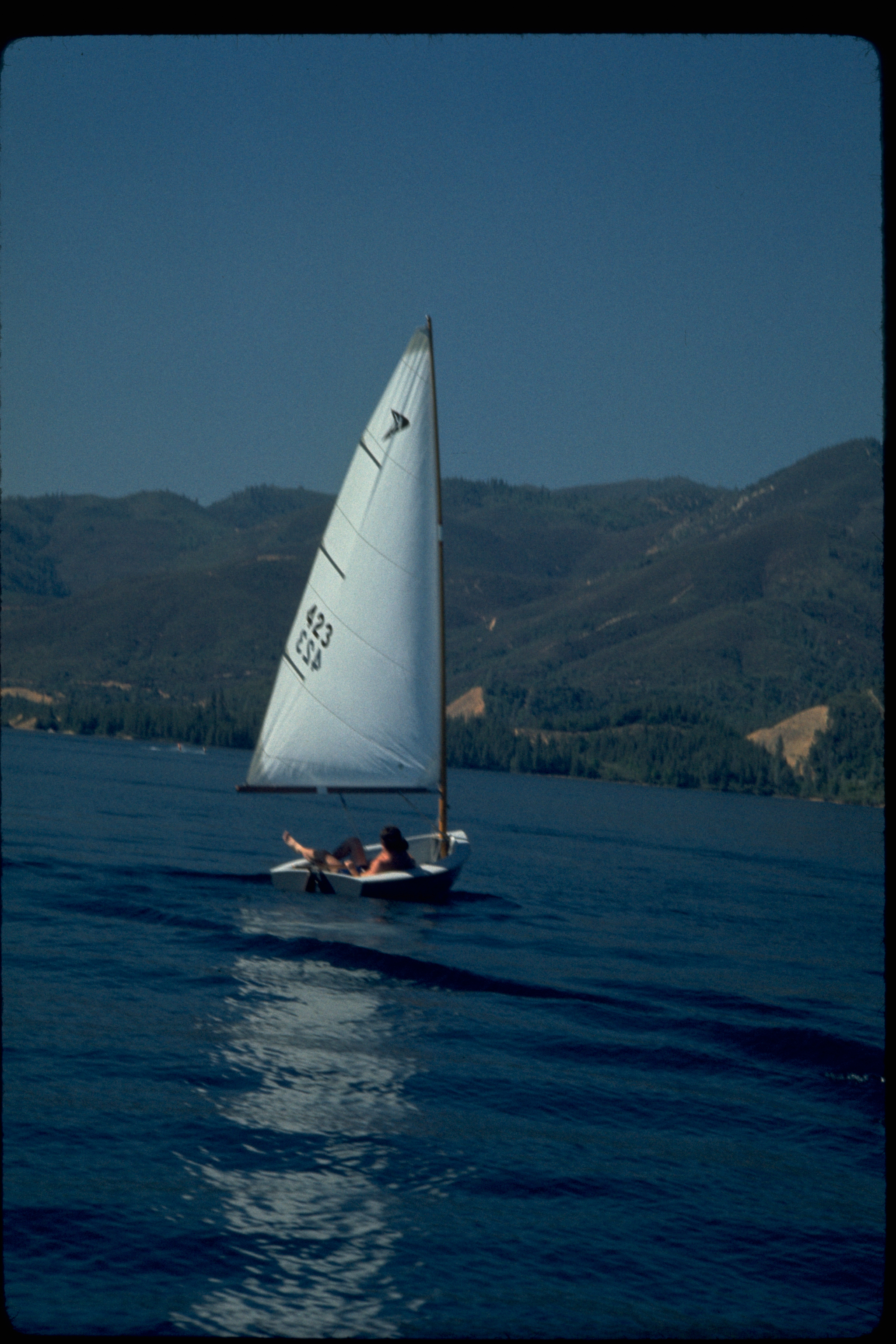
Sailing at Whiskeytown Lake.

The Shasta Unit, centered on Shasta Lake, has four tributary arms; Sacramento River, Pit River, Yet Atwam Creek, and McCloud River. Each has distinctive scenic beauty and attracts outdoor recreation visitors. There are numerous facilities for water sports and boating, including private marinas. Public recreation facilities and amenities within the Shasta Unit include boat ramps, campgrounds, shoreline picnic areas, and hiking/equestrian/mountain biking trails.

Shasta Lake is the largest reservoir in California. When full, the lake has 370 miles (600 km) of shoreline, which exceeds that of San Francisco Bay. The reservoir contains 30,000 acres (12,000 ha), and holds 4,550,000 acre-feet (5,610 Gl) of water. Shasta Lake is formed by Shasta Dam, which is the second largest (after Grand Coulee Dam) and second tallest (after Hoover Dam) concrete dam in the United States.

== National Park Service area ==
=== Whiskeytown Unit ===
The Whiskeytown Unit of the Whiskeytown–Shasta–Trinity National Recreation Area is 42,500 acres (17,200 ha) in size, centered on Whiskeytown Lake of 3,200 acres (1,300 ha).

It also includes 39,000 acres (16,000 ha) surrounding the reservoir. The backcountry, with mountain creeks and waterfalls, is accessible via 70 miles (110 km) of multi-use hiking, equestrian, and/or mountain biking) trails.

== See also ==
- Trinity Mountains — in the southern and eastern sections in the recreation area, part of the Klamath Mountains System.
- Marble Mountains — in the northwestern section, are also part of the Klamath Mountains Range.
- Sierra Nevada — in the eastern section.
- Whiskeytown Falls
- Carr Fire
