= Bell's Bridge (California) =

Historical place in Shasta County, United States

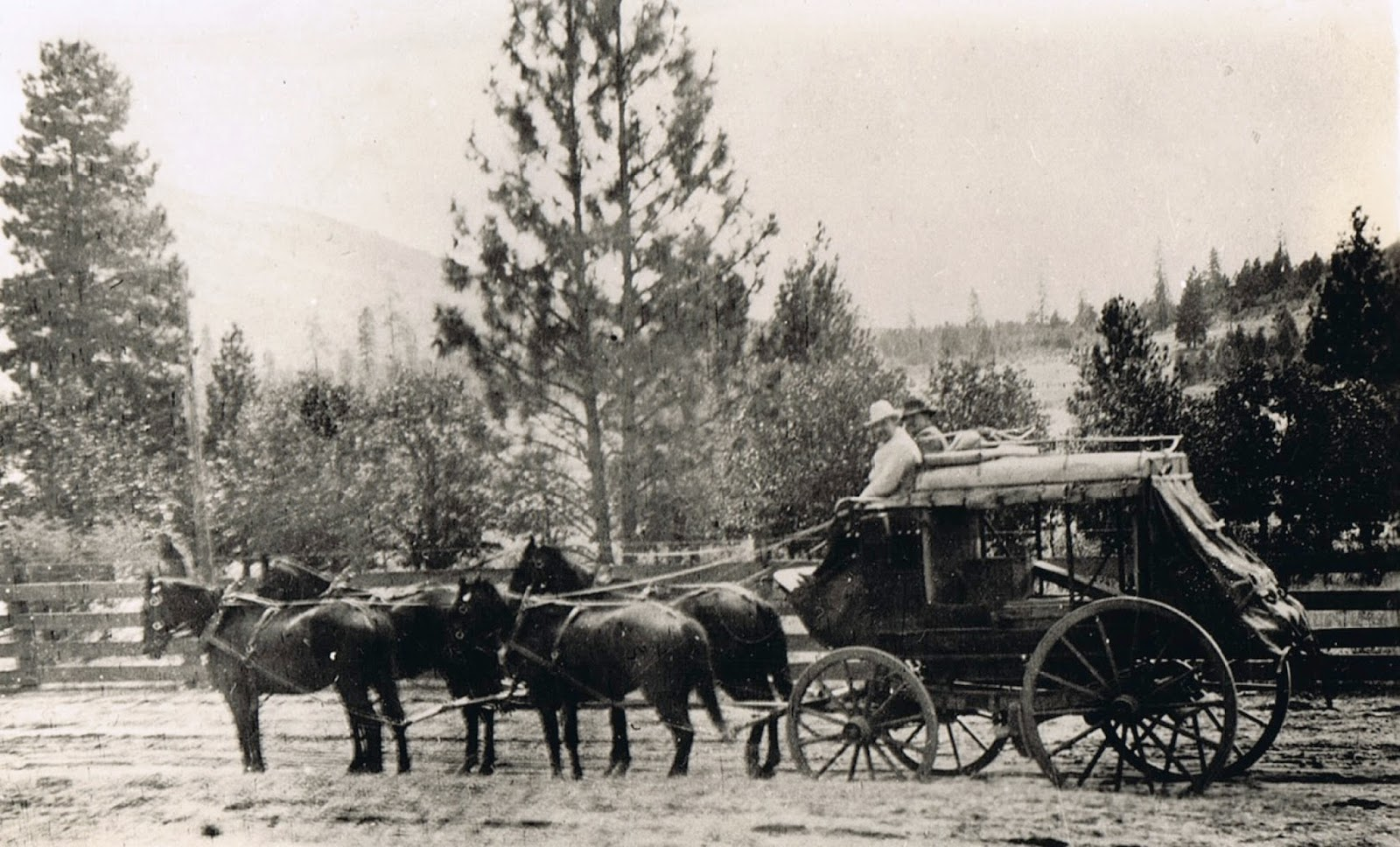
- California-Oregon Stagecoach Company crossed Bell's Bridge till 1887

- Location within California Location within the United States
- 40.516°N 122.381°W
- Location: Corner old Hwy 99 and Clear Creek Road; Redding, California

History
- Built: 1851
- Built for: J. J. Bell

California Historical Landmark
- Designated: May 28, 1954
- Reference no.: 519

Bell's Bridge is a historical site in Redding, California in Shasta County. Battle Rock site is a California Historical Landmark No. 519 listed on May 28, 1954.

Bell's Bridge was built on the 100 mile long toll road from Shasta City to Tehama in 1851 by J. J. Bell. In Redding Bell built a large house and inn, on Clear Creek, the Bell's Mansion in 1859. Many a California Gold Rush miners stopped and rested and eat at Bell's Mansion on their way to the gold fields of Shasta, Trinity, and Siskiyou counties.

Bell's Mansion was a three-story house that was built on the site of removed old log cabin. Bell's Mansion it was made of massive hand-hewn timbers held together with wooden pegs. The first floor of Bell's Mansion had Bells's office, a dining room restaurant, a parlor and two large bedrooms. The back second floor of Bell's Mansion had six bedrooms for female guest. The front second floor and all of the third floor of Bell's Mansion had a large room for all male guest. Bell's Mansion was known for good food and high prices. After Bell's death and the rush was over Mansion became a barn. Mansion was sold to William McCoy in 1879. Due to age and lack of care the barn collapsed in March 1998. The Mansion was at Clear Creek, now the California State Route 273 bridge, and across the street from the Win River Casino at 2100 Redding Rancheria Road, Redding, 40.506°N 122.382°W.

In the past there was a historical marker at the SouthWest corner of old Hwy 99 and Clear Creek Road in Redding.

== See also ==
- California Historical Landmarks in Shasta County
- Bass Hill (California)
