= Rising River Ranch =

- Location within California

General information
- Location: Hat Creek, Shasta County, California, Cassel Rd, Hat Creek, California
- Coordinates: 40.8883717°N 121.5330594°W
- Owner: Clint Eastwood

Rising River Ranch is a 1,067.5-acre (432 ha) property situated northeast of Doyles Corner, west of Rising River Lake, near Cassel and Hat Creek, between Fall River Mills and Burney, in Shasta County, California. Rising River Ranch is notable for its owners. Actor Bing Crosby purchased the ranch in 1958. The Bing Crosby Estate sold it at auction, in 1978, to actor/director Clint Eastwood. The property has been used in movie and TV productions, including Firefox.
