= Foothill High School (Palo Cedro, California) =

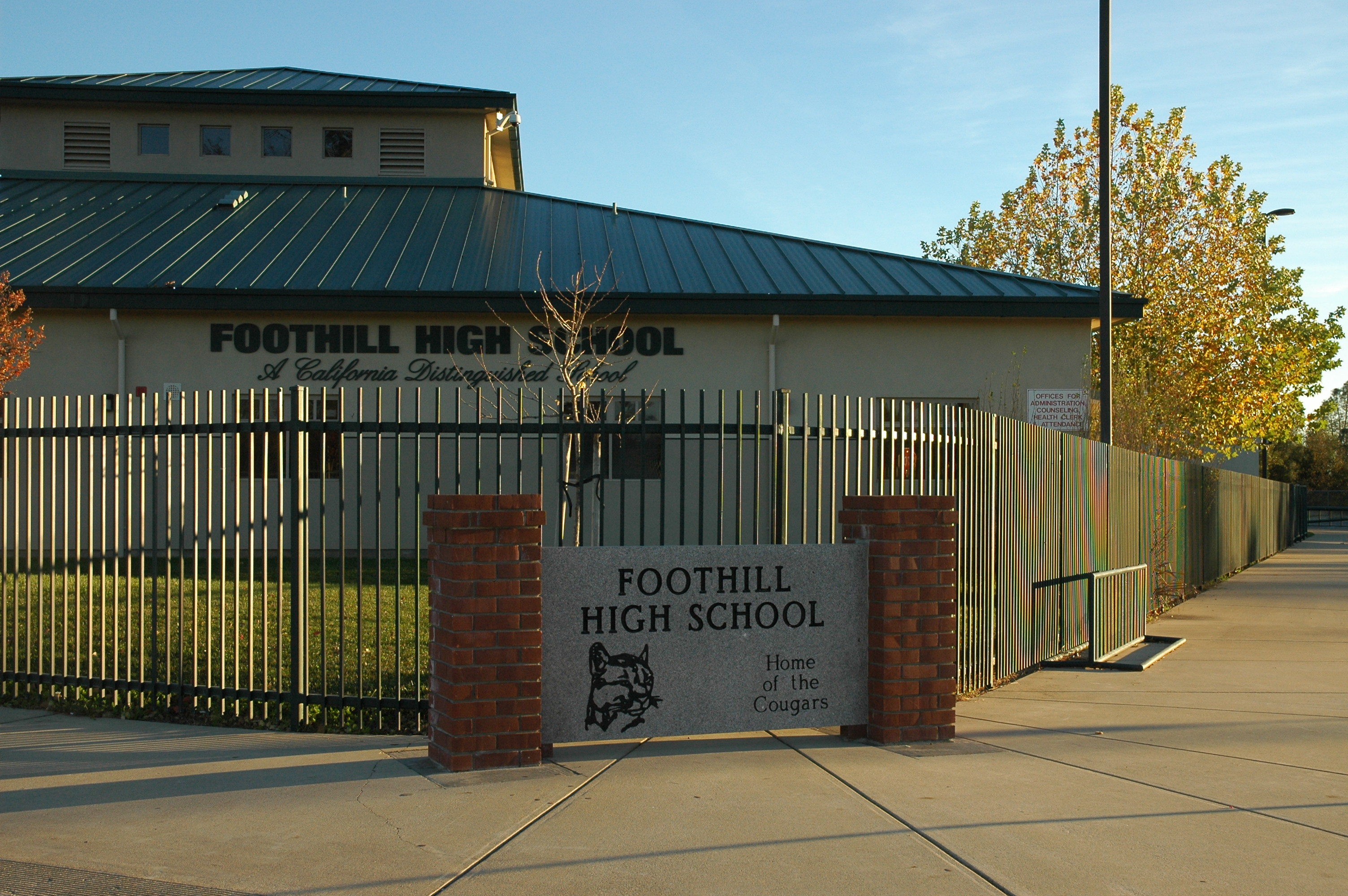

Location
- 9733 Deschutes Road; Palo Cedro, CA; USA; 40.56858°N 122.23682°W

Information
- Type: Public Secondary
- Established: 1991
- School district: Shasta Union High School District
- Principal: Kevin Greene
- Teaching staff: 63.38 (FTE)
- Grades: 9–12
- Enrollment: 1,432 (2024–25)
- Student to teacher ratio: 22.59
- Campus: Rural
- Color
- Mascot: Cougar
- Website: www.foothillcougars.com

Foothill High School is a 4-year public high school in the Shasta Union High School District in California, serving grades 9–12. It serves a wide area from northeastern portions of Redding to the west to Shingletown to the east, including Millville, Bella Vista, Oak Run, Whitmore, Round Mountain, Montgomery Creek, and Big Bend. The school opened in 1991 in a temporary location in Redding and moved in 1999 to a newly built campus in Palo Cedro.

== Academics ==
Foothill offers honors or AP courses in English, earth and space science, math, and geography.

The school's band director, Mitch Bahr, was named a California State Teacher of the Year in 2016.

== Notable alumni ==
- Dylan LaBarbera – American college football defensive tackle for the Nevada Wolf Pack
- Megan Rapinoe – American soccer player
- Lynsi Snyder – Owner of In-N-Out
