= Palo Cedro, California =

Palo Cedro
- Unincorporated Community; Census Designated Place
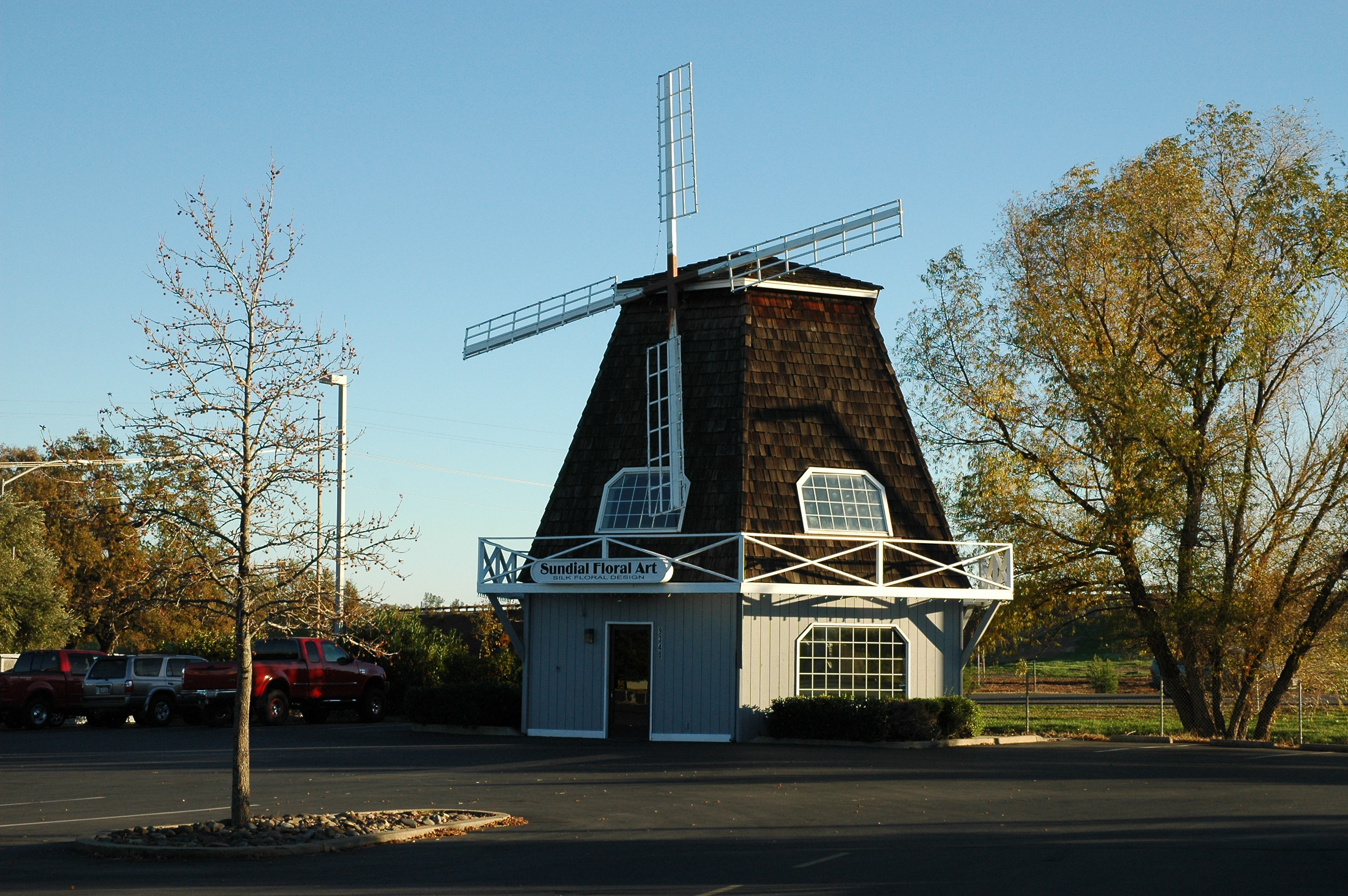
- Windmill, Downtown Palo Cedro

- Location in Shasta County and the state of California
- Coordinates: 40°33′4″N 122°14′3″W
- Country: United States
- State: California
- County: Shasta

Area
  - Total: 8.288 sq mi (21.465 km^{2})
  - Land: 8.180 sq mi (21.185 km^{2})
  - Water: 0.108 sq mi (0.281 km^{2}) 1.31%
- Elevation: 469 ft (143 m)

Population (2020)
  - Total: 2,931
  - Density: 358.3/sq mi (138.4/km^{2})
- Time zone: UTC−8 (Pacific (PST))
  - Summer (DST): UTC−7 (PDT)
- ZIP code: 96073
- Area code(s): 530, 837
- FIPS code: 06-55296
- GNIS feature ID: 0230275

Palo Cedro (Spanish for "Cedar Wood") is a census-designated place (CDP) in Shasta County, California, United States. It is 8 miles (13 km) east of Redding. Its population is 2,931 as of the 2020 census, up from 1,269 from the 2010 census.

Originally, indigenous Native Americans lived in Northern California, including what is now Shasta County, prior to European American settlement. European American exploration of inland California started in 1769 and continued on into the 19th century. Cow Creek, a Sacramento River tributary that runs south through Palo Cedro, was a conduit for entrance into the Sacramento Valley by Hudson Bay Fur Company trappers including Alexander McLeod (1829) and John Work (1832). The town is named after cedarwood trees originally indigenous to the area in the 19th century.

As of the 2020 census, Palo Cedro has a population density of 360 people per square mile (140/km^{2}). Award-winning country musician Merle Haggard lived in Palo Cedro for decades until his death on April 6, 2016.

== History ==
=== Indigenous peoples ===
Prior to white settlement, various Indian tribes settled and inhabited Northern California. These tribes included the Wintu, Patwins, Nozi, Pit Rivers, Hat Creeks, Shastas, Paiutes, and Modoc Indian tribes. The Wintus established their main camp on Cottonwood Creek. Penutian Indian tribes on the Pacific coast or valley included the Maidu, Miwok, Constanoan, Yokuts, Yanas, and other divisions. Historians said that, in the lower 48 continental United States, California has the most native tribes and subdivisions of tribes and more different Indian languages. The Wintus were the largest and most peaceful division that settled in Northern California and Oregon.

=== 18th and 19th centuries ===
During the 18th century, the first recorded Spanish (or any European) land entry and exploration of the present-day state of California, was the Portolá expedition, in 1769–1770, that led to the founding of Alta California, reaching as far north as San Francisco Bay.

The 19th century launched many explorations by whites into California and its northern interior. In March 1812, the Russian-American Fur Company under Ivan Kuskov established a colony at Fort Ross on the coast of what is now Sonoma County. As early as 1817, Father Narciso Durán, on an expedition sighted a snow-capped mountain (Mount Shasta), that he called Jesus Maria, from what is now the Marysville plains. Three years later, in 1827, an expedition to the Klammath Mountains from the Coastal Range, by explorer Luis Argüello and company, sighted two "twin" mountains, believed to be Mount Shasta and Mount Lassen. In 1826, Mount Shasta was seen by Hudson's Bay Company fur trader Peter Skene Ogden. In 1828, Mt. Shasta was seen by United States fur trapper Jedediah Smith; he named it Mt. Simpson. On April 11, 1828, Smith and his party traveled north and entered what is now Shasta County, and proceeded to what is now Burnt Ranch in Trinity County.

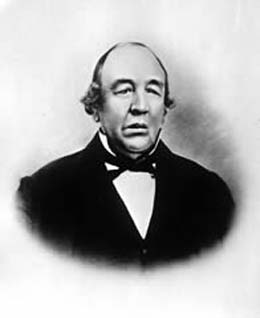
John Work

The earliest European American history of Palo Cedro comes from the exploration of Hudson's Bay trapper Alexander McLeod (c. 1782 – 11 June 1840) who sometime between March 26, 1829, and April 6, 1829, along with guide John Turner, and a brigade of trappers, traveling through Mexican California, started from the Pit River following the Cow Creek trail, and reached the Sacramento River. Cow Creek is a Sacramento River tributary that runs through Palo Cedro and serves as its southeastern border. McLeod had been sent out earlier in January 1829 from Fort Vancouver to find the origins of a mythical Buenaventura River. After crossing the Sacramento River, McLeod explored and trapped in the Sacramento Valley as far South as present day Stockton. Upon his return with an abundant supply of furs, he camped on the west bank of the Sacramento River by present-day Anderson in December 1829. While attempting to cross the Cascades in winter, McLeod was met by a snow storm at the headwaters of the river named after him, the McLeod River (McCloud River), he lost all his horses, was forced to cache his furs, and by snowshoe trek back to Vancouver, arriving on February 10, 1830. (Note: According to historian Rosena A. Giles, the name of the McCloud river was a misspelling of McLeod's original name, and confused by the name of Ross McCloud, a pioneer of the 1850s. In 1878, an unsuccessful attempt was made by C.C. Bush to have the California state legislature change the name of the river from McCloud to McLeod. Frank & Chapel called the river McLeod. Reading called the river McLoud.)

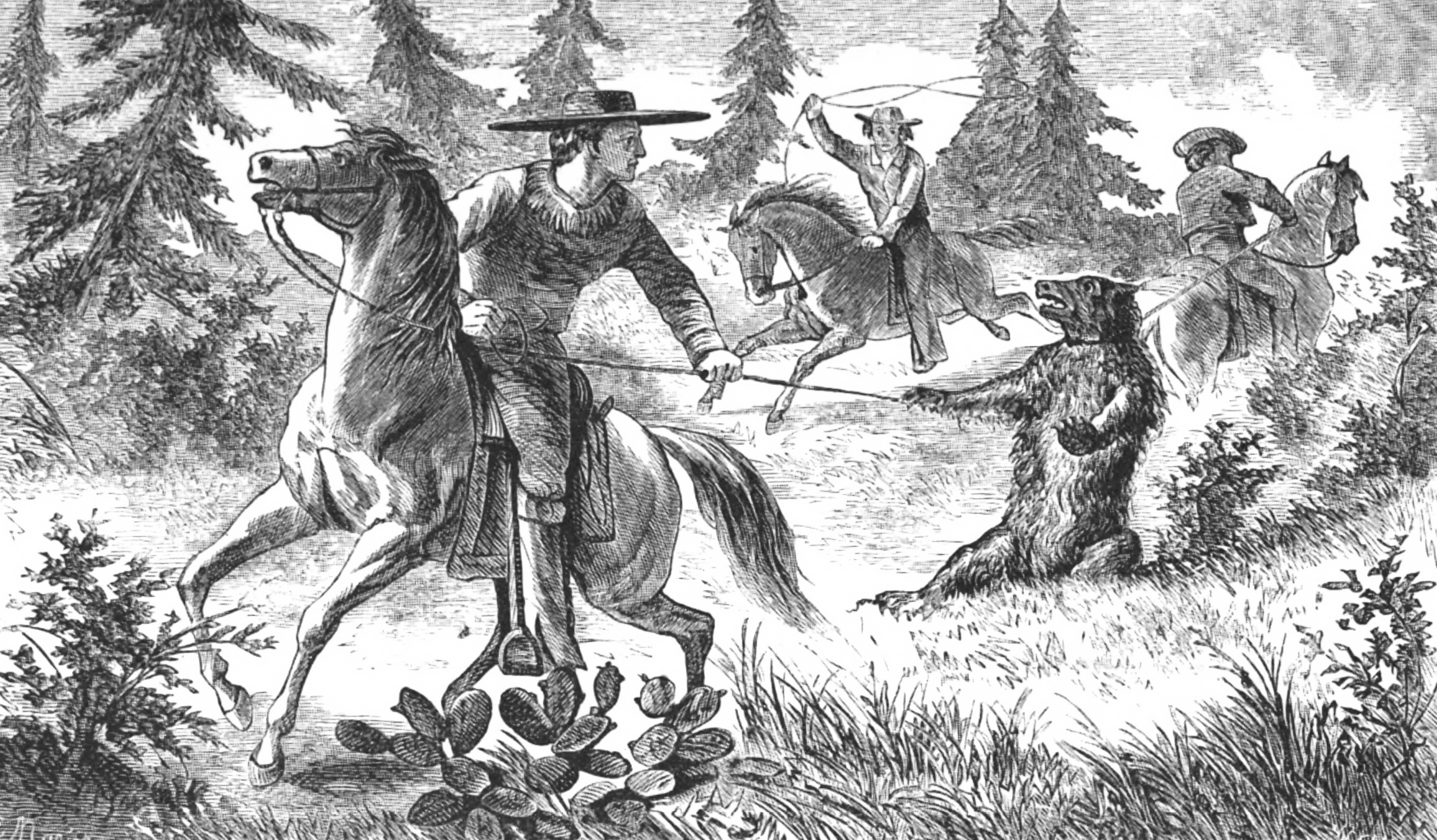
Lassoing a Grizzley 1873 Canadian fur trapper John Work, in 1832, noted there were California grizzlies, in the area of what is now Palo Cedro. California grizzlies were hunted to extinction in the 1920s.

In 1832, another Hudson's Bay trapper John Work (c.1792-1861), searching for a route to connect the Columbia River to the Sacramento River, reported in his journal traveling through Mexican California in with a group from the Hudson's Bay Company fur traders, staying east of the Siskiyous, bypassing Mt. Lassen, along Cow Creek, through the areas now known as Millville and Palo Cedro, finding a way to the Sacramento Valley. (Note: Historian Rosena A. Giles said Work's party included 28 men, 22 women, and 44 children.) In the surrounding area, Work noted there were local Indians who lived in huts, in addition to various wildlife and numerous animals, including deer, elk, and grizzly bears. Local Indian men gave Work and his men food. Work called Cow Creek, Canoe River, and his men chopped down pine trees to make canoes, camped near what is now called Anderson. During their stay, while his men were making the canoes, Work said the Indians were weeping and lamenting and observed six fires were burning in the Indian camp. Work later learned that the local Indian camp had been attacked and burned by another Indian raiding party, possibly the Shastas. After trapping in the Sacramento Valley, work retraced his steps to the Pit River, and using the same route as McLeod had earlier used through Bartle's Gap, but without disaster, emerged from the mountains and was assisted back to Vancouver.

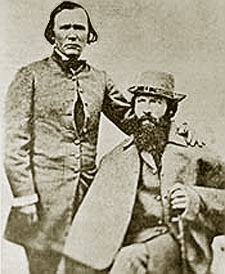
John C. Frémont (seated) and his guide Kit Carson.

In 1846, on his third expedition, John C. Frémont and his military party, followed the Cow Creek, Walla Walla Trail through what is now Shasta County, headed north to Klammath Lake area in Oregon. (Note: Walla Walla or old Columbian are terms for the trail between Mount Shasta and Mount Lassen.) Frémont's guide for three federal expeditions was mountain man Kit Carson.

In June 1850, U.S. Army Captain Nathaniel Lyon, and his military party along with Colonel Freaner, left Pierson Reading's Rancho Buena Ventura following Fremont's route through the Cow Creek and Pit River. Lyon had been sent from Benicia by his government to avenge the death of Captain Warren.

In 1883, a United States post office was established for this area; at that time, the town was known as Albertson. The name was changed to Roberts in 1885 and finally to Palo Cedro in 1893, meaning "cedarwood" in Spanish, after the cedar trees of the area.

In 1891, T. W. H. Shannahan and Joe Enright bought 30 acres (12 ha) of land from Lem Benton and had it divided into 12 lots. The town never materialized or was developed, but the original cedar tree for which it was named was cut down. School children since then planted cedar trees at the Junction School District yard.

In 1897, or shortly before, the Anderson and Bella Vista Railroad was constructed by the Terry Lumber Company from Anderson to Bella Vista, passing through Palo Cedro. Miners used this railroad, as did the Terry Lumber Company at Bella Vista. The train delivered groceries and mail to the villages along its route. It also had a passenger car.

=== 20th and 21st centuries ===
In the early 1900s, the stage route went from Redding through Palo Cedro, Millville, Oak Run, and on to Fall River Mills.

Palo Cedro's first school house was located near the corner of Hillside Drive and Deschutes Road on the south side of town. Later it was moved to a site near the Grange Hall, on the north side of town. The school was located there until the "new" Junction School was built in 1960 on the south side of town.

In 1907 or thereabouts, Frank and Mary Love owned the Palo Cedro general store. The store was on the west side of the tracks and their house on the east. A two-story house on the northeast corner of Deschutes Road and Old Forty-Four Drive may, at one time, have been a stopping place for stage drivers and travelers. Sarah Addington later owned the Palo Cedro store. She was also the postmaster and handed the position down to her daughter, Mary Jones. She moved the post office next door into her home. Mary Jones' assistants were her sisters. The next postmaster was Sylvia Metz. As she found the post office needed more space, it moved to a two-story building on the north side of Palo Cedro.

The first Grange Hall and Feed Store were constructed in the early 1930s, just off Deschutes Road on Old Highway 44. The building was two stories with the meeting and/or dance hall upstairs. The dining room was downstairs in back and the feed store in front. This building burned down in the early 1940s and was quickly replaced with a one-story building, which is still in use in the 21st century.

== Geography ==
Palo Cedro is located at 40°33′4″N 122°14′3″W (40.551091, −122.234255) at an elevation of 465 ft (143 m) above sea level.

According to the United States Census Bureau, the CDP has a total area of 8.29 square miles (21.5 km^{2}), of which 98.7% is land and 1.3% is water.

At the 2010 U.S. census, the CDP has a total area of 3.75 square miles (9.7 km^{2}), of which 98.1% was land and 1.9% was water.

== Demographics ==
Historical population
| Census | Pop. | Note | %± |
|---|---|---|---|
| 2000 | 1,247 | | — |
| 2010 | 1,269 | | 1.8% |
| 2020 | 2,931 | | 131.0% |
U.S. Decennial Census; 1860–1870 1880-1890; 1900 1910 1920; 1930 1940 1950; 1960 1970 1980; 1990 2000 2010

Palo Cedro first appeared as a census designated place in the 2000 U.S. census.

=== 2020 census ===
As of the 2020 census, Palo Cedro had a population of 2,931. The population density was 358.4 inhabitants per square mile (138.4/km^{2}).

The age distribution was 689 people (23.5%) under the age of 18, 166 people (5.7%) aged 18 to 24, 538 people (18.4%) aged 25 to 44, 775 people (26.4%) aged 45 to 64, and 763 people (26.0%) who were 65 years of age or older. The median age was 47.5 years. For every 100 females there were 96.3 males, and for every 100 females age 18 and over there were 95.5 males age 18 and over.

0.0% of residents lived in urban areas, while 100.0% lived in rural areas. The whole population lived in households.

There were 1,067 households in Palo Cedro, of which 323 (30.3%) had children under the age of 18 living in them. Of all households, 719 (67.4%) were married-couple households, 57 (5.3%) were cohabiting couple households, 128 (12.0%) were households with a male householder and no spouse or partner present, and 163 (15.3%) were households with a female householder and no spouse or partner present. About 179 households (16.8%) were made up of individuals and 112 (10.5%) had someone living alone who was 65 years of age or older. The average household size was 2.75. There were 834 families (78.2% of all households).

There were 1,112 housing units at an average density of 136.0 units per square mile (52.5 units/km^{2}), of which 1,067 (96.0%) were occupied and 45 (4.0%) were vacant. Of occupied units, 947 (88.8%) were owner-occupied and 120 (11.2%) were occupied by renters. The homeowner vacancy rate was 1.0% and the rental vacancy rate was 5.5%.

Racial composition as of the 2020 census
| Race | Number | Percent |
|---|---|---|
| White | 2,453 | 83.7% |
| Black or African American | 20 | 0.7% |
| American Indian and Alaska Native | 36 | 1.2% |
| Asian | 56 | 1.9% |
| Native Hawaiian and Other Pacific Islander | 5 | 0.2% |
| Some other race | 58 | 2.0% |
| Two or more races | 303 | 10.3% |
| Hispanic or Latino (of any race) | 207 | 7.1% |

=== Income and poverty ===
In 2023, the US Census Bureau estimated that the median household income was $118,542, and the per capita income was $51,222. About 1.4% of families and 3.1% of the population were below the poverty line.

=== 2010 census ===
The 2010 United States census reported that Palo Cedro had a population of 1,269. The population density was 338.1 inhabitants per square mile (130.5/km^{2}). The racial makeup of Palo Cedro was 1,164 (91.7%) White, 7 (0.6%) African American, 24 (1.9%) Native American, 6 (0.5%) Asian, 1 (0.1%) Pacific Islander, 22 (1.7%) from other races, and 45 (3.5%) from two or more races. Hispanic or Latino of any race were 74 persons (5.8%).

The Census reported that 1,260 people (99.3% of the population) lived in households, 4 (0.3%) lived in non-institutionalized group quarters, and 5 (0.4%) were institutionalized.

There were 474 households, out of which 153 (32.3%) had children under the age of 18 living in them, 318 (67.1%) were opposite-sex married couples living together, 41 (8.6%) had a female householder with no husband present, 24 (5.1%) had a male householder with no wife present. There were 18 (3.8%) unmarried opposite-sex partnerships, and 7 (1.5%) same-sex married couples or partnerships. 70 households (14.8%) were made up of individuals, and 38 (8.0%) had someone living alone who was 65 years of age or older. The average household size was 2.66. There were 383 families (80.8% of all households); the average family size was 2.89.

The population was spread out, with 289 people (22.8%) under the age of 18, 74 people (5.8%) aged 18 to 24, 192 people (15.1%) aged 25 to 44, 429 people (33.8%) aged 45 to 64, and 285 people (22.5%) who were 65 years of age or older. The median age was 48.3 years. For every 100 females, there were 96.4 males. For every 100 females age 18 and over, there were 95.6 males.

There were 504 housing units at an average density of 134.3 per square mile (51.9/km^{2}), of which 411 (86.7%) were owner-occupied, and 63 (13.3%) were occupied by renters. The homeowner vacancy rate was 1.9%; the rental vacancy rate was 7.2%. 1,072 people (84.5% of the population) lived in owner-occupied housing units and 188 people (14.8%) lived in rental housing units.

== Politics ==
In the state legislature Palo Cedro is located in the 1st senatorial district, represented by Republican Megan Dahle, and the 1st Assembly district, represented by Republican Heather Hadwick.

Federally, Palo Cedro is in California's 1st congressional district, represented by Republican James Gallagher.

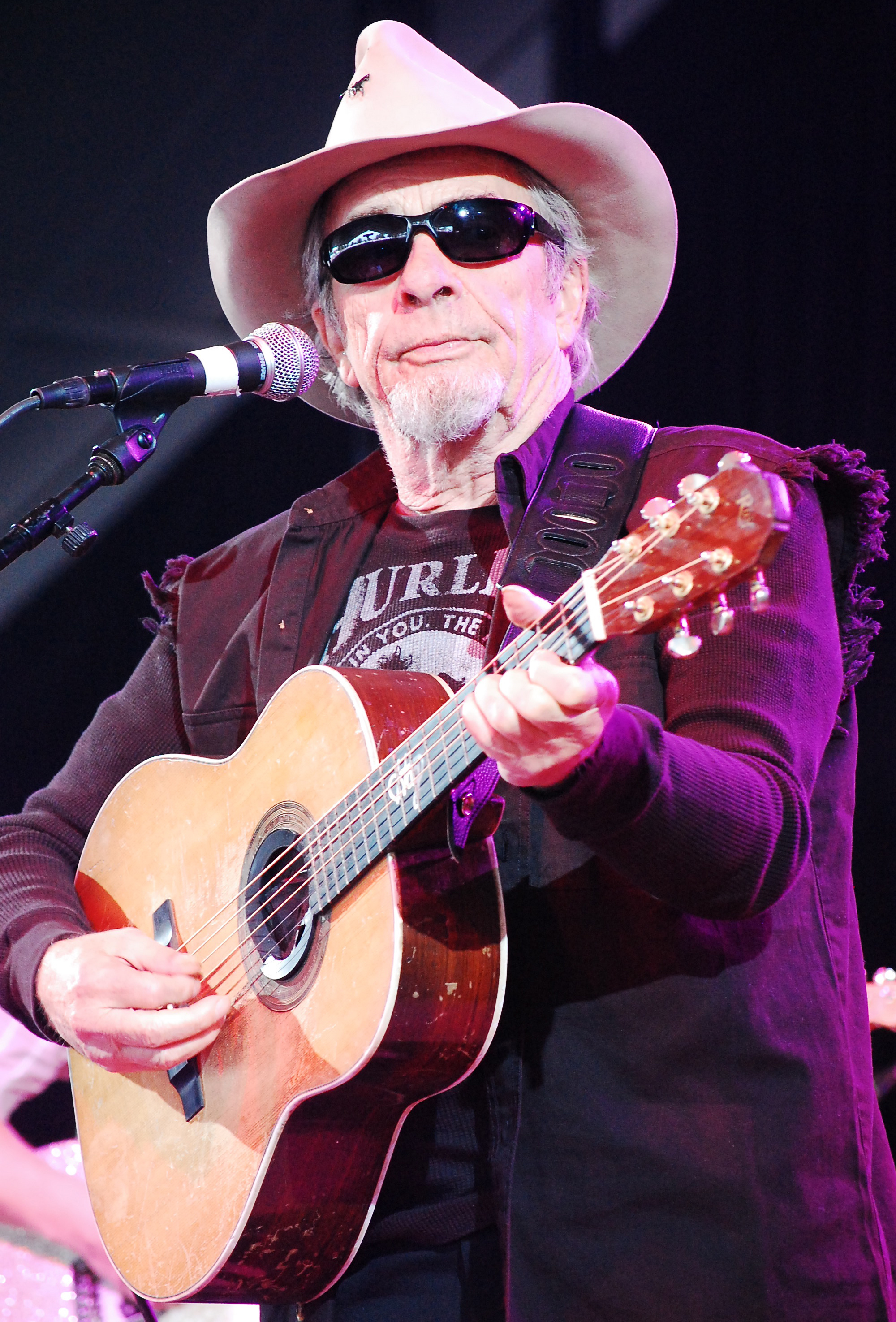
Merle Haggard June 2009

== Notable people ==
- Merle Haggard, country musician, lived in Palo Cedro for decades until his death on his 79th birthday (April 6, 2016).

== Education ==
Elementary Schools

- North Cow Creek School
- Junction Elementary School
- Chrysalis Charter School
- Redding Christian School

Middle Schools

- Junction Intermediate School
- Saint Francis Middle School
- Chrysalis Charter School
- North Cow Creek School
- Redding Christian School

High Schools

- Foothill High School has an API score of 817, making it one of the best public schools in northern California.
- Bishop Quinn High School
- Redding Christian School

== Image gallery ==
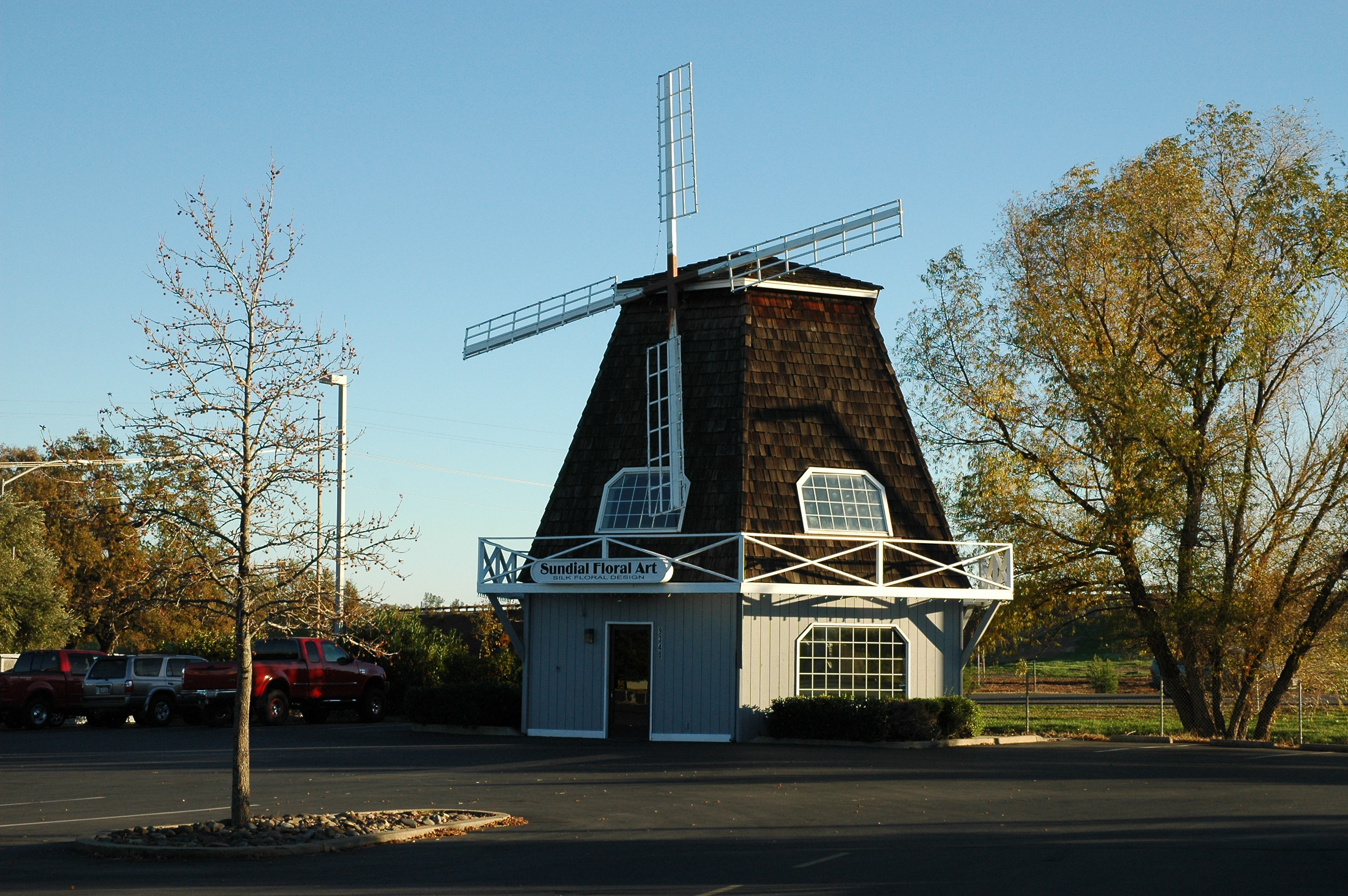
Windmill landmark in Palo Cedro shopping center (November 2007)

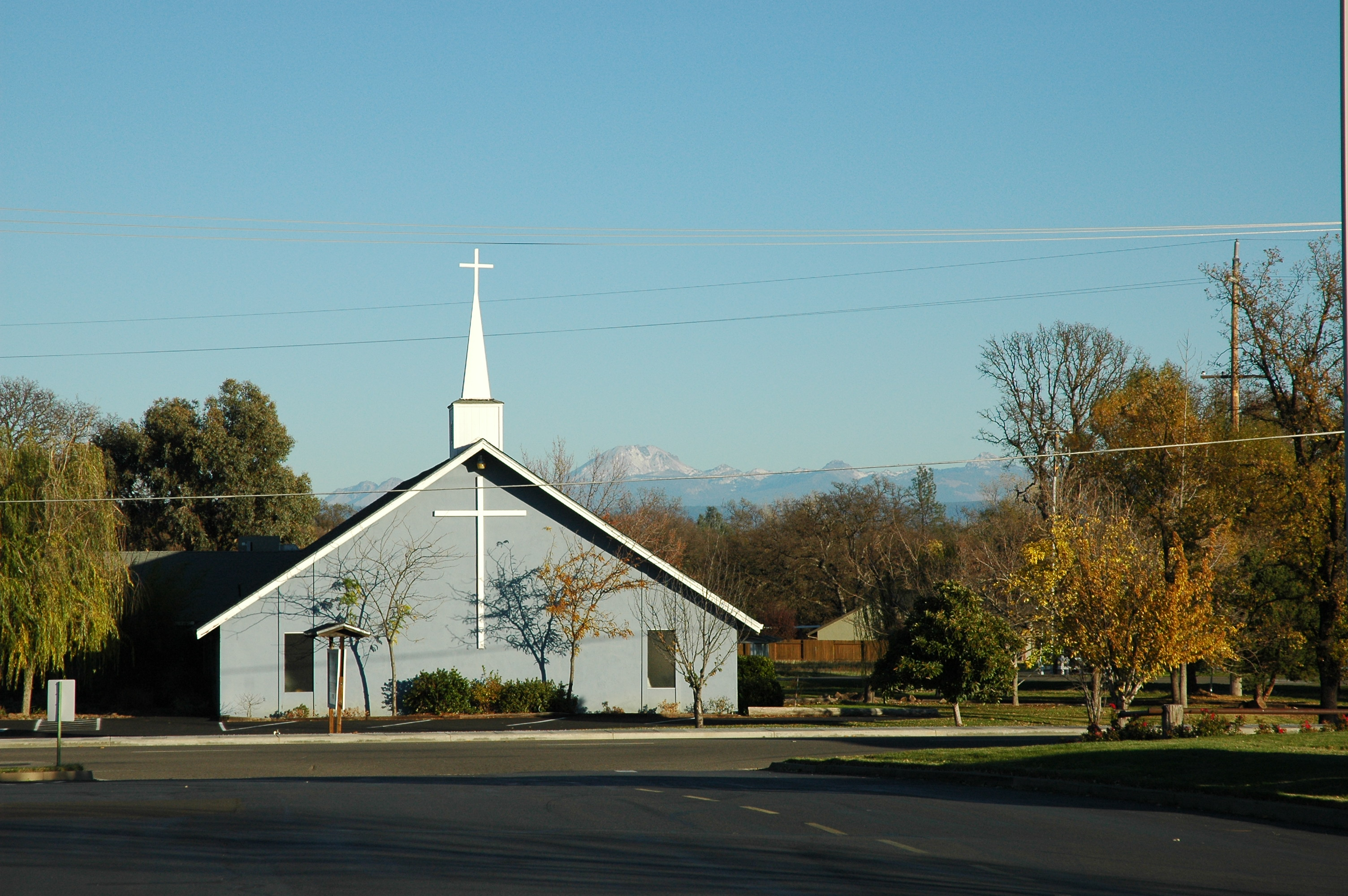
Local Church with Mount Lassen in the Background (November 2007)

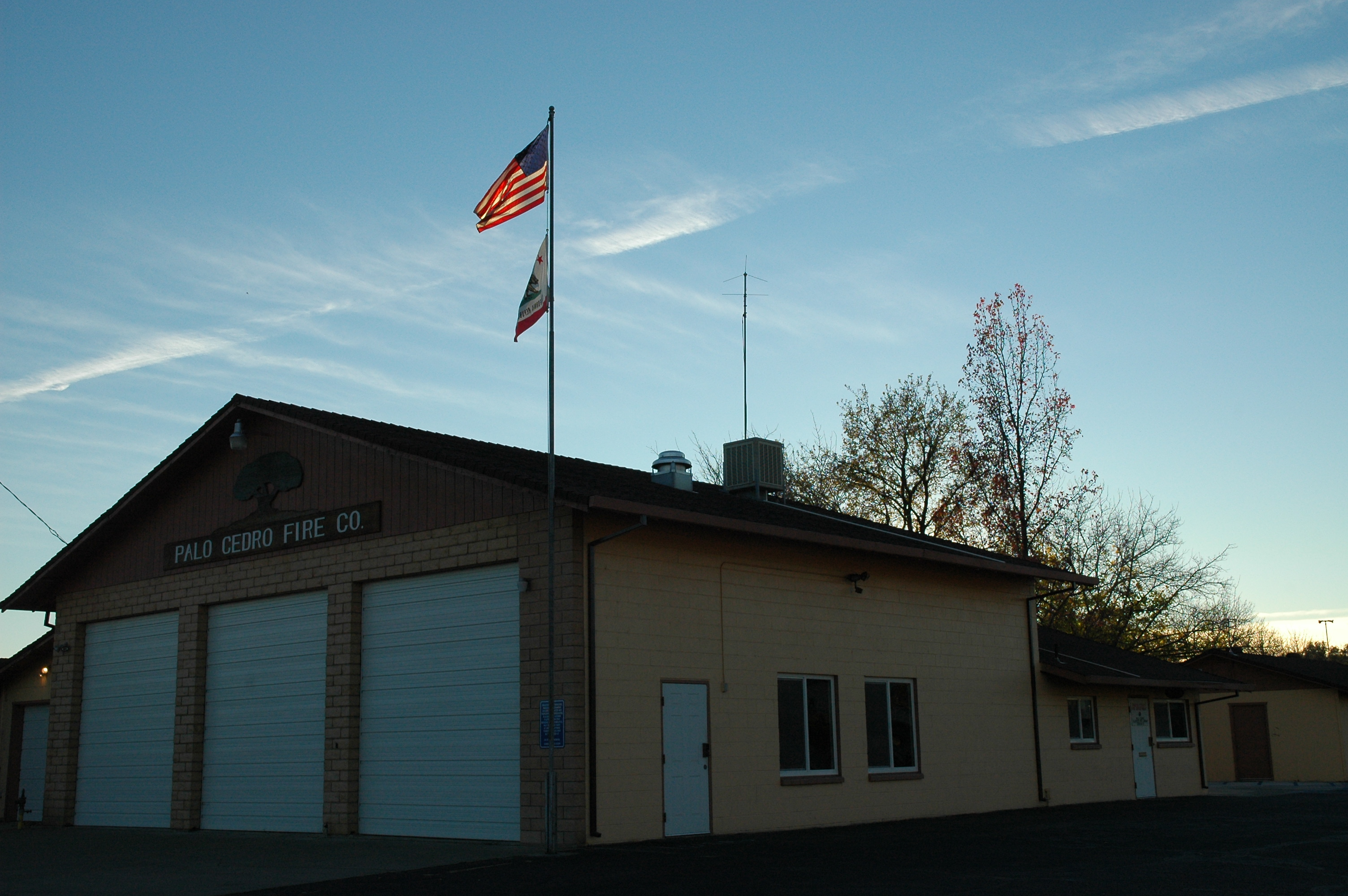
Palo Cedro Fire Department (November 2007)

Junction Middle School (November 2007)

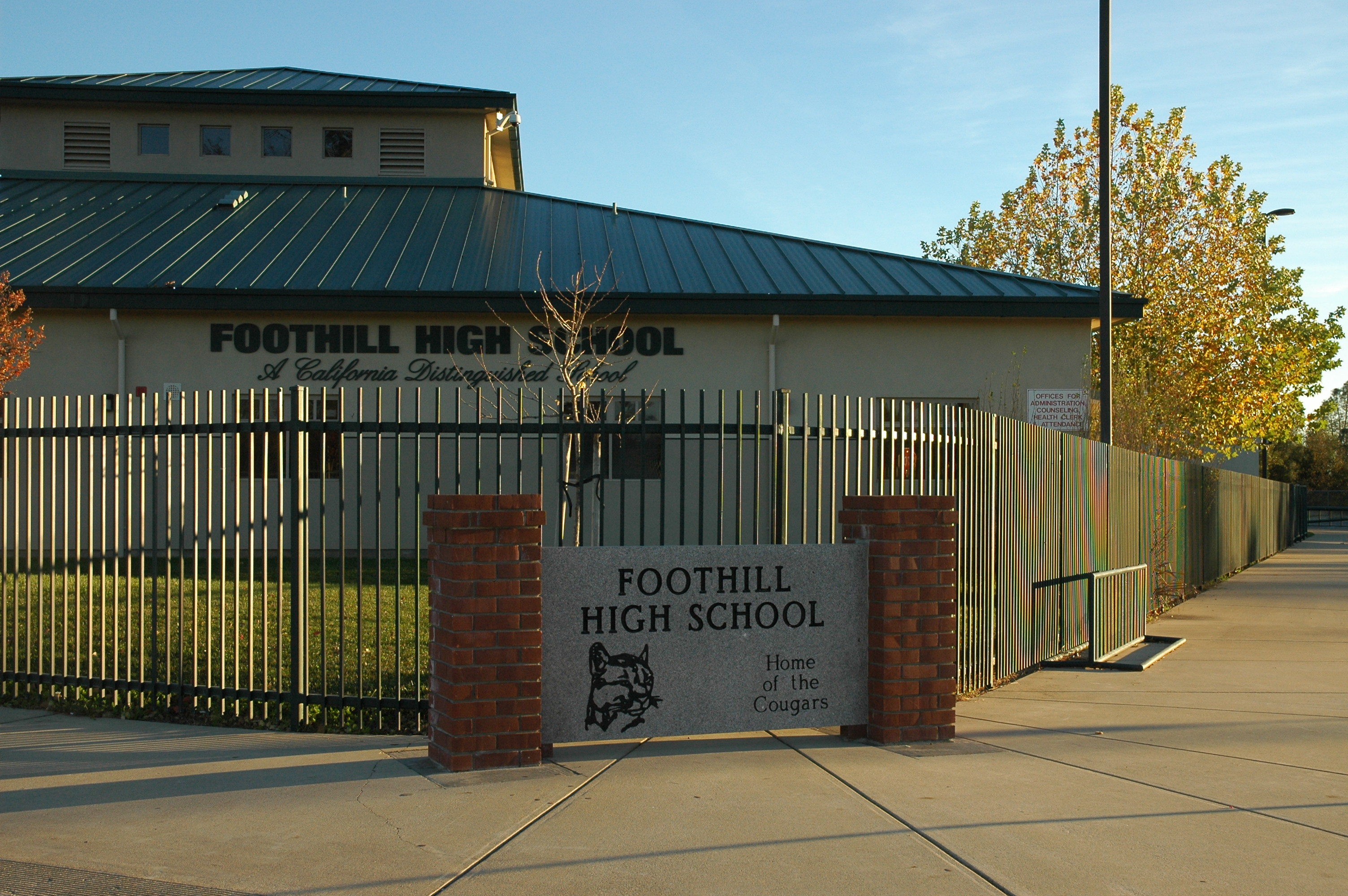
Foothill High School (November 2007)

== Sources ==
=== Books and Journals ===
- Fort Ross Establishment of the California Settlement. Fort Ross Interpretive Association (Fort Ross Conservancy). 1998. ISBN 1-56540-355-X.
- Giles, Rosena A. (1949). Shasta County California A History (California Centennial ed.). Oakland: Biobooks.
- Maloney, Alice Bay; Work, John (September 1943). "Fur Brigade to the Bonaventura: John Work's California Expedition of 1832-33 for the Hudson's Bay Company" (PDF). California Historical Society Quarterly. 22 (3). California Historical Society: 193–222.
- Owens, Kenneth N. (2002). "Begun by Gold". In Kenneth N. Owens (ed.). Riches for All: The California Gold Rush and the World. Lincoln: University of Nebraska Press. ISBN 0-8032-3570-4.

=== Internet ===
- "Oak Run 96069 Real Estate". Berkshire Hathaway Home Services. 2018.
- "Whitmore, CA 96096 Population Growth and Population Statistics". CLR Choice, Inc. 2012.
- "Crews paving way for new Rite Aid; Palo Cedro windmill set to come down". Redding Record Searchlight. 2016.
