= Black Butte Union Elementary School District =

School district in California, United States

Black Butte Union School District

Location
- 7752 Ponderosa Way; Shingletown, California 96088 United States

Other information
- Website: web.archive.org/web/20080105110529/http://www.shastalink.k12.ca.us:80/bbutte/

Black Butte Union School District is a public school district based in Shasta County, California.
