= Bishop Quinn High School =

Location
- 21893 Old 44 Drive; Palo Cedro, California; USA; 40.56201°N 122.24311°W

Information
- Type: private Catholic high school
- Motto: Love God, Love One Another
- Established: 1995
- Closed: 2008
- School district: Roman Catholic Diocese of Sacramento
- Principal: Carolyn Germano
- Teaching staff: 9 (2007)
- Grades: 9-12
- Campus: Suburban
- Colors: Maroon and Gold
- Accreditation: Western Association of Schools and Colleges (WASC) in 2006; Western Catholic Educational Association (WECA) in 2006
- Affiliations: National Catholic Educational Association

Bishop Quinn High School was a small, private Catholic high school in Palo Cedro near Redding, California. The school is named after Bishop Francis Quinn, the diocese's bishop emeritus. The school was designed to serve the Catholic population of Shasta County, California.

== History ==
The school was founded in 1995 by the Roman Catholic Diocese of Sacramento. Although initially falling short of desired number of pupils, the school had grown to approximately 200 students from an inaugural class of 26. The 26 freshman who matriculated in 1995 represented the school's first graduating class in 1999. With the closing of St. Francis Middle School in 2007 (which was located on the same campus) Bishop Quinn saw a drop in attendance to around 85 students in the 2007–2008 school year, 22 of whom were seniors. Bishop Quinn closed after the 07–08 school year due to the low attendance which continued to drop. This made their rival school, Mercy High School in Red Bluff, California, the only Catholic high school north of Sacramento.

== Other local schools ==
- Elementary schools:
  - North Cow Creek School
  - Junction Elementary School
  - Chrysalis Charter School
- Middle schools
  - Junction Intermediate School
  - Saint Francis Middle School
  - Chrysalis Charter School
- High schools
  - Foothill High School
