= Cow Creek (Sacramento River tributary) =

- Location of the mouth of Cow Creek in California

Location
- Country: United States
- State: California

Physical characteristics
- Source: Confluence of Old Cow Creek and South Cow Creek
  - location: Millville, Shasta County
  - coordinates: 40°32′38″N 122°13′52″W
  - elevation: 558 ft (170 m)
- Mouth: Sacramento River
  - location: Anderson, Shasta County
  - coordinates: 40°27′52″N 122°13′52″W
  - elevation: 374 ft (114 m)
- Length: 14 mi (23 km)
- Basin size: 430 sq mi (1,100 km^{2})
- Discharge
  - location: river mile 2.9 (km 7.5)
  - average: 672 cu ft/s (19.0 m^{3}/s)
  - minimum: 0.02 cu ft/s (0.00057 m^{3}/s)
  - maximum: 48,700 cu ft/s (1,380 m^{3}/s)

Basin features
- Tributaries
  - left: South Cow Creek
  - right: Old Cow Creek, Clover Creek, Oak Run, Little Cow Creek

Cow Creek

Cow Creek is a tributary of the Sacramento River in Shasta County, California. About 46.9 miles (75.5 km) long measured to its longest source, it drains a hilly, rural region at the northern end of the Sacramento Valley east of Redding. The creek begins at Millville at the confluence of Old Cow and South Cow Creek and flows west to Junction, where it turns south, joining the Sacramento near Anderson. Despite its name, Cow Creek is closer in size to a river, especially in winter when it is prone to large flash floods, accounting for up to 21 percent of the Sacramento's peak flows at Red Bluff.

The Cow Creek watershed of 430 square miles (1,100 km^{2}) is approximately equally divided between agriculture, private residences, and commercial forestland, with very little public land. About 45 percent of the watershed is forested. Situated in the foothills of the southern Cascade Range, elevations range from about 7,300 feet (2,200 m) at the tallest peaks to less than 400 feet (120 m) at the confluence with the Sacramento River. Because the creek has no major dams, it is an important spawning area for Chinook salmon and steelhead trout; however, diversions for irrigation and pollution from farm runoff have reduced the quality of native fish habitat.

Although the main stem is short at 14 miles (23 km), the creek has an extensive network of tributaries that collectively drain a much larger area. The 32.9-mile (52.9 km) Old Cow Creek and 28.5-mile (45.9 km) South Cow Creek originate in the Lassen National Forest, as does 27.5-mile (44.3 km) Clover Creek, which joins Cow Creek a short distance below the confluence. The other major tributaries are 24.5-mile (39.4 km) Oak Run and 36-mile (58 km) Little Cow Creek, which drain a large area close to Shasta Lake.

== See also ==
- List of rivers of California
