= Jones Valley, California =

- Unincorporated community Census-designated place
- Location within California Location within the United States
- Coordinates: 40°41′40″N 122°14′40″W
- Country: United States
- State: California
- County: Shasta

Area
  - Total: 6.44 sq mi (16.67 km^{2})
  - Land: 6.43 sq mi (16.66 km^{2})
  - Water: 0.0039 sq mi (0.01 km^{2})
- Elevation: 787 ft (240 m)

Population (2020)
  - Total: 1,160
  - Density: 180/sq mi (69.6/km^{2})
- Time zone: UTC-8 (Pacific (PST))
  - Summer (DST): UTC-7 (PDT)
- ZIP Code: 96003 (Redding)
- Area code: 530
- FIPS code: 06-37533
- GNIS feature ID: 2813352

Jones Valley is an unincorporated community and census-designated place (CDP) in Shasta County, California, United States. It is bordered to the south by Bella Vista and is 14 miles (23 km) northeast of Redding, the county seat. Its population is 1,160 as of the 2020 census.

== Demographics ==
Historical population
Census	Pop.	Note	%±
2020	1,160		—
U.S. Decennial Census; 1850–1870 1880-1890; 1900 1910 1920; 1930 1940 1950; 1960 1970 1980; 1990 2000 2010 2020

Jones Valley first appeared as a census designated place in the 2020 U.S. census.

=== 2020 census ===
As of the 2020 census, Jones Valley had a population of 1,160. The median age was 46.9 years. 19.4% of residents were under the age of 18 and 22.6% of residents were 65 years of age or older. For every 100 females there were 101.4 males, and for every 100 females age 18 and over there were 103.7 males age 18 and over.

0.0% of residents lived in urban areas, while 100.0% lived in rural areas.

There were 453 households in Jones Valley, of which 20.3% had children under the age of 18 living in them. Of all households, 48.8% were married-couple households, 23.6% were households with a male householder and no spouse or partner present, and 18.5% were households with a female householder and no spouse or partner present. About 28.4% of all households were made up of individuals and 13.5% had someone living alone who was 65 years of age or older.

There were 503 housing units, of which 9.9% were vacant. The homeowner vacancy rate was 2.4% and the rental vacancy rate was 3.5%.

Jones Valley CDP, California – Racial and ethnic composition Note: the US Census treats Hispanic/Latino as an ethnic category. This table excludes Latinos from the racial categories and assigns them to a separate category. Hispanics/Latinos may be of any race.
Race / Ethnicity (NH = Non-Hispanic)	Pop 2020	% 2020
White alone (NH)	942	81.21%
Black or African American alone (NH)	3	0.26%
Native American or Alaska Native alone (NH)	27	2.33%
Asian alone (NH)	22	1.90%
Pacific Islander alone (NH)	3	0.26%
Other race alone (NH)	3	0.26%
Mixed race or Multiracial (NH)	77	6.64%
Hispanic or Latino (any race)	83	7.16%
Total	1,160	100.00%
