= Mountain Gate, California =

Mountain Gate
- census-designated place
- Position in California.
- Coordinates: 40°42′48″N 122°20′14″W
- Country: United States
- State: California
- County: Shasta

Area
  - Total: 1.975 sq mi (5.116 km^{2})
  - Land: 1.975 sq mi (5.116 km^{2})
  - Water: 0 sq mi (0 km^{2}) 0%
- Elevation: 915 ft (279 m)

Population (2020)
  - Total: 815
  - Density: 413/sq mi (159/km^{2})
- Time zone: UTC-8 (Pacific (PST))
  - Summer (DST): UTC-7 (PDT)
- GNIS feature ID: 2628760

Mountain Gate is a census-designated place (CDP) in Shasta County, California, United States. Mountain Gate sits at an elevation of 915 feet (279 m). Its population is 815 as of the 2020 census, down from 943 from the 2010 census.

== Geography ==
According to the United States Census Bureau, the CDP covers an area of 2.0 square miles (5.1 km^{2}), all land.

== Demographics ==
The 2020 United States census reported that Mountain Gate had a population of 815. The population density was 412.7 inhabitants per square mile (159.3/km^{2}). The racial makeup of Mountain Gate was 673 (82.6%) White, 4 (0.5%) African American, 16 (2.0%) Native American, 15 (1.8%) Asian, 1 (0.1%) Pacific Islander, 27 (3.3%) from other races, and 79 (9.7%) from two or more races. Hispanic or Latino of any race were 64 persons (7.9%).

The whole population lived in households. There were 338 households, out of which 91 (26.9%) had children under the age of 18 living in them, 139 (41.1%) were married-couple households, 41 (12.1%) were cohabiting couple households, 68 (20.1%) had a female householder with no partner present, and 90 (26.6%) had a male householder with no partner present. 104 households (30.8%) were one person, and 57 (16.9%) were one person aged 65 or older. The average household size was 2.41. There were 201 families (59.5% of all households).

The age distribution was 174 people (21.3%) under the age of 18, 38 people (4.7%) aged 18 to 24, 162 people (19.9%) aged 25 to 44, 257 people (31.5%) aged 45 to 64, and 184 people (22.6%) who were 65 years of age or older. The median age was 49.1 years. For every 100 females, there were 106.9 males.

There were 392 housing units at an average density of 198.5 units per square mile (76.6 units/km^{2}), of which 338 (86.2%) were occupied. Of these, 237 (70.1%) were owner-occupied, and 101 (29.9%) were occupied by renters.

== Politics ==
In the state legislature Mountain Gate is located in the 1st senatorial district, represented by Republican Megan Dahle, and the 1st Assembly district, represented by Republican Heather Hadwick.

Federally, Mountain Gate is in California's 1st congressional district, represented by Republican James Gallagher.
