= Happy Valley, Shasta County, California =

Unincorporated community in California, United States

Happy Valley, California
- Unincorporated community Census-designated place
- Location in California Happy Valley, California (the United States)
- Coordinates: 40°27′58″N 122°25′14″W
- Country: United States
- State: California
- County: Shasta

Area
  - Total: 16.865 sq mi (43.68 km^{2})
  - Land: 0.115 sq mi (0.30 km^{2})
  - Water: 16.980 sq mi (43.98 km^{2})
- Elevation: 755 ft (230 m)

Population (2020)
  - Total: 4,949
  - Density: 43,000/sq mi (16,600/km^{2})
- Time zone: UTC-8 (Pacific)
  - Summer (DST): UTC-7 (PDT)
- GNIS feature ID: 2813350

Happy Valley is an unincorporated community and census designated place (CDP) in Shasta County, California, United States, 11 miles (18 km) southwest of Redding. It lies at an elevation of approximately 850 feet. Its population is 4,949 as of the 2020 census. It is roughly divided into Cloverdale and Olinda across Happy Valley Road at Palm Road. The United States Postal Service delivers mail to the residents of Happy Valley from nearby city Anderson. Happy Valley has a volunteer fire department.

== Demographics ==
Historical population
Census	Pop.	Note	%±
2020	4,949		—
U.S. Decennial Census; 1850–1870 1880-1890; 1900 1910 1920; 1930 1940 1950; 1960 1970 1980; 1990 2000 2010; 2020

Happy Valley first appeared as a census designated place in the 2020 U.S. census.

=== 2020 Census ===
Happy Valley CDP, California – Racial and ethnic composition Note: the US Census treats Hispanic/Latino as an ethnic category. This table excludes Latinos from the racial categories and assigns them to a separate category. Hispanics/Latinos may be of any race.
Race / Ethnicity (NH = Non-Hispanic)	Pop 2020	% 2020
White alone (NH)	3,706	74.88%
Black or African American alone (NH)	25	0.51%
Native American or Alaska Native alone (NH)	124	2.51%
Asian alone (NH)	209	4.22%
Pacific Islander alone (NH)	10	0.20%
Other race alone (NH)	30	0.61%
Mixed race or Multiracial (NH)	306	6.18%
Hispanic or Latino (any race)	539	10.89%
Total	4,949	100.00%

== See also ==
- Reading's Bar
- California Historical Landmarks in Shasta County
