= Keswick, California =

Keswick
- census-designated place
- Location of Keswick in Shasta County, California.

- Position in California.
- Coordinates: 40°36′47″N 122°27′39″W
- Country: United States
- State: California
- County: Shasta

Area
  - Total: 3.503 sq mi (9.074 km^{2})
  - Land: 3.378 sq mi (8.748 km^{2})
  - Water: 0.126 sq mi (0.326 km^{2}) 3.59%
- Elevation: 732 ft (223 m)

Population (2020)
  - Total: 188
  - Density: 55.7/sq mi (21.5/km^{2})
- Time zone: UTC-8 (Pacific (PST))
  - Summer (DST): UTC-7 (PDT)
- GNIS feature ID: 2583046

Keswick is a census-designated place (CDP) in Shasta County, California, United States. Keswick sits at an elevation of 732 feet (223 m). Its population is 188 as of the 2020 census, down from 451 from the 2010 census.

== Geography ==
According to the United States Census Bureau, the CDP covers an area of 3.5 square miles (9.1 km^{2}), of which 96.41% is land and 3.59% is water.

== Demographics ==
Historical population
Census	Pop.	Note	%±
2010	451		—
2020	188		−58.3%
U.S. Decennial Census

The 2020 United States census reported that Keswick had a population of 188. The population density was 55.7 inhabitants per square mile (21.5/km^{2}). The racial makeup of Keswick was 145 (77.1%) White, 0 (0.0%) African American, 12 (6.4%) Native American, 1 (0.5%) Asian, 0 (0.0%) Pacific Islander, 1 (0.5%) from other races, and 29 (15.4%) from two or more races. Hispanic or Latino of any race were 21 persons (11.2%).

The whole population lived in households. There were 83 households, out of which 21 (25.3%) had children under the age of 18 living in them, 44 (53.0%) were married-couple households, 10 (12.0%) were cohabiting couple households, 15 (18.1%) had a female householder with no partner present, and 14 (16.9%) had a male householder with no partner present. 15 households (18.1%) were one person, and 11 (13.3%) were one person aged 65 or older. The average household size was 2.27. There were 60 families (72.3% of all households).

The age distribution was 39 people (20.7%) under the age of 18, 11 people (5.9%) aged 18 to 24, 31 people (16.5%) aged 25 to 44, 50 people (26.6%) aged 45 to 64, and 57 people (30.3%) who were 65 years of age or older. The median age was 51.0 years. There were 90 males and 98 females.

There were 99 housing units at an average density of 29.3 units per square mile (11.3 units/km^{2}), of which 83 (83.8%) were occupied, all by homeowners.

== Politics ==
In the state legislature, Keswick is in the 1st senatorial district, represented by Republican Megan Dahle, and the 1st Assembly district, represented by Republican Heather Hadwick.

Federally, Keswick is in California's 1st congressional district, represented by Republican James Gallagher.

== History ==
The town was catastrophically damaged by the 2018 Carr Fire, which destroyed all but two homes.
