= Bella Vista, California =

- census-designated place
- Location of Bella Vista in Shasta County, California

- Position in California
- Coordinates: 40°39′06″N 122°15′23″W
- Country: United States
- State: California
- County: Shasta

Area
  - Total: 26.64 sq mi (68.99 km^{2})
  - Land: 26.44 sq mi (68.49 km^{2})
  - Water: 0.20 sq mi (0.51 km^{2}) 0.64%
- Elevation: 656 ft (200 m)

Population (2020)
  - Total: 3,641
  - Density: 137.7/sq mi (53.16/km^{2})
- Time zone: UTC-8 (Pacific (PST))
  - Summer (DST): UTC-7 (PDT)
- ZIP Code: 96008
- Area code(s): 530, 837
- GNIS feature ID: 2582942

Bella Vista (Spanish for "Beautiful View") is a census-designated place (CDP) in Shasta County, California, United States. Bella Vista is a small, rural community about 9 miles (14 km) northeast of Redding, and about 5 miles (8.0 km) north of Palo Cedro. Its population is 3,641 as of the 2020 census, up from 2,781 from the 2010 census. Historically, Bella Vista was a semi-large lumber town which hosted its own railroad.

== History ==
Bella Vista was once a thriving lumber town. A lumber flume fed a mill at the present-day location of the end of Meyers Road and Deschutes. The flume was completed by the Shasta Lumber Company in August 1888 when it reached Bella Vista. The lumber flume was a V-shape structure which was elevated to 90’ in height and supported by scaffolds. Lumber from nearby Round Mountain was shipping via the flume to the mill at Bella Vista, where it would be treated and sent south to the railhead at Anderson. Present day Bella Vista was the end of the lumber flume and the site was originally called the dump, because it was the dumping point of the lumber coming off the lumber flume. The original town site was established with a general merchandise store owned by the Shasta Lumber Company, company offices, a planning mill and additional buildings. Bella Vista was once a thriving community and at its peak, hosted a population of 2,000. Bella Vista's community consisted of saloons, barber shops and various stores, including gas stations.

Bella Vista once hosted the Anderson and Bella Vista Railway, which was a 15-mile freight carrier that hauled lumber and other commodities to the Southern Pacific railhead in Anderson. The bottleneck of the operation was the transfer of the lumber from the mill at Bella Vista to the nearest rail connection, which was 10 miles away, in Anderson, and on the wrong side of the Sacramento River. Circa 1891, work began on the Anderson & Bella Vista Railroad down the valley of Cow Creek to the Southern Pacific railhead in Anderson. The railroad was abandoned in the 1930s and torn up shortly after.

The distance of this lumber flume was 32 miles long from its start at Hatchet Mountain to its dumping point. From the dump, the Shasta Lumber Company wanted to continue construction of the lumber flume towards Anderson, but the valley terrain was too level to allow the lumber flume to operate and they had to come up with additional methods to transport their lumber from the dump to the Southern Pacific's station in Anderson for their product to be shipped to the market.

== Geography ==
According to the United States Census Bureau, the CDP covers an area of 26.6 square miles (69.0 km^{2}), of which 99.26% is land and 0.74% is water.

== Demographics ==
Historical population
| Census | Pop. | Note | %± |
|---|---|---|---|
| 2010 | 2,781 | | — |
| 2020 | 3,641 | | 30.9% |
U.S. Decennial Census; 1850–1870 1880-1890; 1900 1910 1920; 1930 1940 1950; 1960 1970 1980; 1990 2000 2010

=== 2020 census ===
As of the 2020 census, Bella Vista had a population of 3,641 and a population density of 137.7 inhabitants per square mile (53.2/km^{2}). The median age was 51.0 years. 19.0% of residents were under the age of 18 and 26.9% of residents were 65 years of age or older. For every 100 females there were 104.7 males, and for every 100 females age 18 and over there were 100.3 males age 18 and over.

0.0% of residents lived in urban areas, while 100.0% lived in rural areas.

The census reported that 99.9% of the population lived in households, 0.1% lived in non-institutionalized group quarters, and no one was institutionalized.

There were 1,390 households in Bella Vista, of which 26.1% had children under the age of 18 living in them. Of all households, 60.6% were married-couple households, 5.4% were cohabiting couple households, 15.5% were households with a male householder and no spouse or partner present, and 18.4% were households with a female householder and no spouse or partner present. About 19.1% of all households were made up of individuals and 9.5% had someone living alone who was 65 years of age or older. The average household size was 2.62. There were 1,054 families (75.8% of all households).

There were 1,464 housing units at an average density of 55.4 units per square mile (21.4 units/km^{2}), of which 1,390 (94.9%) were occupied and 74 (5.1%) were vacant. Of the occupied units, 87.4% were owner-occupied and 12.6% were occupied by renters. The homeowner vacancy rate was 0.9% and the rental vacancy rate was 2.7%.

Racial composition as of the 2020 census
| Race | Number | Percent |
|---|---|---|
| White | 3,145 | 86.4% |
| Black or African American | 9 | 0.2% |
| American Indian and Alaska Native | 67 | 1.8% |
| Asian | 49 | 1.3% |
| Native Hawaiian and Other Pacific Islander | 1 | 0.0% |
| Some other race | 74 | 2.0% |
| Two or more races | 296 | 8.1% |
| Hispanic or Latino (of any race) | 254 | 7.0% |

=== 2010 census ===
Bella Vista first appeared as a census designated place in the 2010 U.S. census.

== Politics ==
In the state legislature, Bella Vista is located in the 1st senatorial district, represented by Republican Megan Dahle, and the 1st Assembly district, represented by Republican Heather Hadwick.

Federally, Bella Vista is in California's 1st congressional district, represented by Republican James Gallagher.

== Education ==
- Bella Vista Elementary School District
