= Cassel, California =

Cassel
- census-designated place
- Location of Cassel in Shasta County, California.

- Position in California.
- Coordinates: 40°55′14″N 121°33′05″W
- Country: United States
- State: California
- County: Shasta

Area
  - Total: 2.10 sq mi (5.44 km^{2})
  - Land: 2.03 sq mi (5.25 km^{2})
  - Water: 0.073 sq mi (0.19 km^{2}) 3.56%
- Elevation: 3,176 ft (968 m)

Population (2020)
  - Total: 207
  - Density: 102.2/sq mi (39.46/km^{2})
- Time zone: UTC-8 (Pacific (PST))
  - Summer (DST): UTC-7 (PDT)
- ZIP Code: 96016
- Area code: 530
- GNIS feature ID: 2611427

Cassel is a census-designated place (CDP) in Shasta County, California, United States. Cassel sits at an elevation of 3,176 feet (968 m). Its population is 207 as of the 2020 census, remaining the same from the 2010 census. The ZIP Code is 96016. The community is served by area code 530.

== Geography ==
According to the United States Census Bureau, the CDP covers an area of 2.1 square miles (5.4 km^{2}), of which 96.44% is land and 3.56% is water.

=== Climate ===
This region experiences hot and dry summers, with highs over 90 °F (32 °C) in July and August. According to the Köppen Climate Classification system, Cassel has a warm-summer Mediterranean climate, abbreviated "Csb" on climate maps.

Climate data for Cassel, California, 40.9206°N 121.5514°W, 3,196 feet (974 m)
Month	Jan	Feb	Mar	Apr	May	Jun	Jul	Aug	Sep	Oct	Nov	Dec	Year
Mean daily maximum °F (°C)	46.8 (8.2)	51.0 (10.6)	56.6 (13.7)	62.6 (17.0)	72.0 (22.2)	81.6 (27.6)	90.9 (32.7)	89.9 (32.2)	83.7 (28.7)	70.5 (21.4)	54.5 (12.5)	45.3 (7.4)	67.1 (19.5)
Daily mean °F (°C)	35.8 (2.1)	38.8 (3.8)	43.2 (6.2)	47.9 (8.8)	55.8 (13.2)	63.4 (17.4)	70.6 (21.4)	68.9 (20.5)	62.9 (17.2)	52.4 (11.3)	41.4 (5.2)	34.9 (1.6)	51.3 (10.7)
Mean daily minimum °F (°C)	24.8 (−4.0)	26.5 (−3.1)	29.8 (−1.2)	33.2 (0.7)	39.6 (4.2)	45.2 (7.3)	50.3 (10.2)	47.9 (8.8)	42.1 (5.6)	34.3 (1.3)	28.4 (−2.0)	24.4 (−4.2)	35.5 (2.0)
Average precipitation inches (mm)	2.69 (68)	2.77 (70)	2.37 (60)	1.78 (45)	1.56 (40)	0.61 (15)	0.16 (4.1)	0.16 (4.1)	0.42 (11)	1.11 (28)	1.96 (50)	3.09 (78)	18.68 (473.2)
Source: PRISM (spatially interpolated, 1991-2020 normals)

== Demographics ==
Historical population
Census	Pop.	Note	%±
2010	207		—
2020	207		0.0%
U.S. Decennial Census; 1850–1870 1880-1890; 1900 1910 1920; 1930 1940 1950; 1960 1970 1980; 1990 2000 2010

=== 2020 census ===
As of the 2020 census, Cassel had a population of 207. The population density was 102.2 inhabitants per square mile (39.5/km^{2}). For every 100 females there were 132.6 males, and for every 100 females age 18 and over there were 140.0 males age 18 and over.

0.0% of residents lived in urban areas, while 100.0% lived in rural areas.

The median age was 57.9 years. The age distribution was 27 people (13.0%) under the age of 18, 12 people (5.8%) aged 18 to 24, 32 people (15.5%) aged 25 to 44, 59 people (28.5%) aged 45 to 64, and 77 people (37.2%) who were 65 years of age or older. There were 118 males and 89 females.

There were 100 households in Cassel, of which 11.0% had children under the age of 18 living in them. Of all households, 56.0% were married-couple households, 7.0% were cohabiting couple households, 19.0% were households with a male householder and no spouse or partner present, and 18.0% were households with a female householder and no spouse or partner present. About 29.0% of all households were made up of individuals and 22.0% had someone living alone who was 65 years of age or older. The average household size was 2.07. There were 66 families (66.0% of all households).

There were 146 housing units at an average density of 72.1 units per square mile (27.8 units/km^{2}), of which 100 (68.5%) were occupied and 31.5% were vacant. Of the occupied units, 93 (93.0%) were owner-occupied and 7 (7.0%) were occupied by renters. The homeowner vacancy rate was 0.0% and the rental vacancy rate was 22.2%.

Racial composition as of the 2020 census
Race	Number	Percent
White	181	87.4%
Black or African American	0	0.0%
American Indian and Alaska Native	1	0.5%
Asian	2	1.0%
Native Hawaiian and Other Pacific Islander	2	1.0%
Some other race	6	2.9%
Two or more races	15	7.2%
Hispanic or Latino (of any race)	14	6.8%

== Politics ==
In the state legislature Cassel is in the 1st senatorial district, represented by Republican Megan Dahle, and the 1st Assembly district, represented by Republican Heather Hadwick. Federally, Cassel is in California's 1st congressional district, represented by Republican James Gallagher.

== Points of Interest ==
The Pacific Crest National Scenic Trail passes east of Cassel.

Just north of the town is the site of Packway Materials, who have repurposed broken construction equipment into sculpture.
