= Bella Vista Elementary School District =

School district in California, United States

Address
- 22661 Old Alturas Road Bella Vista, California, 96008; United States

District information
- Type: Public
- Grades: K–8
- NCES District ID: 0604350

Students and staff
- Students: 337 (2020–2021)
- Teachers: 18.38 (FTE)
- Staff: 13.91 (FTE)
- Student–teacher ratio: 18.34:1

Other information
- Website: www.bveagles.com

Bella Vista Elementary School District is a public school district based in Shasta County, California.
