= Ponderosa Way =

Location

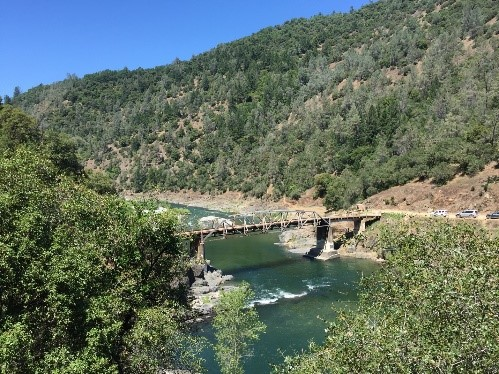
Ponderosa Way crosses over the American River

The Civilian Conservation Corps built an 800 mile long firebreak called Ponderosa Way during the Great Depression. This firebreak runs through part of Oregon and California. The Civilian Conservation Corps was created in 1933 to put unemployed men to work.

Much of Ponderosa Way has fallen into disrepair. However, the Federal Highway Administration plans to replace a bridge where Ponderosa Way crosses over the North Fork American River at coordinates 38.999542°N 120.939754°W. The new bridge will help to reduce erosion by fast moving water around its supports—a problem called bridge scour.

The project is scheduled for completion by the end of 2022.
