= Hat Creek, California =

Hat Creek
- Census designated place
- Location of Hat Creek in Shasta County, California.

- Position in California.
- Coordinates: 40°47′23″N 121°28′28″W
- Country: United States
- State: California
- County: Shasta

Area
  - Total: 50.184 sq mi (129.975 km^{2})
  - Land: 50.013 sq mi (129.533 km^{2})
  - Water: 0.171 sq mi (0.443 km^{2}) 0.34%
- Elevation: 3,422 ft (1,043 m)

Population (2020)
  - Total: 266
  - Density: 5.32/sq mi (2.05/km^{2})
- Time zone: UTC-8 (Pacific (PST))
  - Summer (DST): UTC-7 (PDT)
- ZIP Code: 96040
- Area code: 530
- GNIS feature ID: 2583033

Hat Creek is a census designated place (CDP) in Shasta County, California, United States. Hat Creek is situated at an elevation of 3,422 feet (1,043 m). Its population is 266 as of the 2020 census, down from 309 from the 2010 census.

Hat Creek is located 26 miles (42 km) north of Lassen Park, 13 miles (21 km) southeast of Burney (9 miles (14 km) south of the junction of hwy 89 and 299), and 15 miles (24 km) south of Burney Falls. Its zip code is 96040. Wired telephone numbers are from the Burney central office and follow the pattern 530-335-xxxx. Hat Creek is home to the Hat Creek Radio Observatory, run by SETI Institute.

The town's main economies are tourism, fishing, camping, and lodging. It is a travel hot spot in Shasta County, approximately 70 miles (110 km) east of Redding and about the same distance to Susanville.

In 2021 the town was threatened by the Dixie Fire.

== Geography ==
According to the United States Census Bureau, the CDP covers an area of 50.2 square miles (130 km^{2}), of which 99.66% is land and 0.34% is water.

== Climate ==
Hat Creek has a warm-summer Mediterranean climate (Csb) according to the Köppen climate classification system.

Climate data for Hat Creek (1991–2020 normals, extremes 1921–present)
Month	Jan	Feb	Mar	Apr	May	Jun	Jul	Aug	Sep	Oct	Nov	Dec	Year
Record high °F (°C)	70 (21)	79 (26)	83 (28)	94 (34)	101 (38)	108 (42)	113 (45)	110 (43)	107 (42)	100 (38)	88 (31)	68 (20)	113 (45)
Mean daily maximum °F (°C)	47.7 (8.7)	52.5 (11.4)	58.2 (14.6)	63.8 (17.7)	73.6 (23.1)	82.4 (28.0)	91.4 (33.0)	90.5 (32.5)	84.5 (29.2)	71.4 (21.9)	55.7 (13.2)	46.4 (8.0)	68.2 (20.1)
Daily mean °F (°C)	35.0 (1.7)	38.0 (3.3)	42.9 (6.1)	47.8 (8.8)	55.9 (13.3)	62.8 (17.1)	69.2 (20.7)	67.3 (19.6)	61.3 (16.3)	50.9 (10.5)	40.6 (4.8)	34.2 (1.2)	50.5 (10.3)
Mean daily minimum °F (°C)	22.2 (−5.4)	23.6 (−4.7)	27.6 (−2.4)	31.7 (−0.2)	38.2 (3.4)	43.3 (6.3)	47.1 (8.4)	44.2 (6.8)	38.0 (3.3)	30.3 (−0.9)	25.5 (−3.6)	22.0 (−5.6)	32.8 (0.4)
Record low °F (°C)	−17 (−27)	−8 (−22)	6 (−14)	10 (−12)	15 (−9)	21 (−6)	27 (−3)	27 (−3)	21 (−6)	10 (−12)	7 (−14)	−20 (−29)	−20 (−29)
Average precipitation inches (mm)	3.02 (77)	2.62 (67)	2.68 (68)	1.84 (47)	1.48 (38)	0.71 (18)	0.16 (4.1)	0.17 (4.3)	0.38 (9.7)	1.09 (28)	2.11 (54)	3.03 (77)	19.29 (490)
Average snowfall inches (cm)	0.4 (1.0)	2.4 (6.1)	1.1 (2.8)	0.8 (2.0)	0.0 (0.0)	0.0 (0.0)	0.0 (0.0)	0.0 (0.0)	0.0 (0.0)	0.0 (0.0)	0.4 (1.0)	5.6 (14)	10.7 (27)
Average precipitation days (≥ 0.01 in)	12.2	11.2	12.3	9.4	7.6	3.7	1.0	0.7	2.3	4.9	8.6	12.3	86.2
Average snowy days (≥ 0.1 in)	1.0	1.0	0.6	0.3	0.0	0.0	0.0	0.0	0.0	0.0	0.3	1.0	4.2
Source: NOAA

== Demographics ==
Historical population
Census	Pop.	Note	%±
2010	309		—
2020	266		−13.9%
U.S. Decennial Census

The 2020 United States census reported that Hat Creek had a population of 266. The population density was 5.3 inhabitants per square mile (2.0/km^{2}). The racial makeup of Hat Creek was 183 (68.8%) White, 0 (0.0%) African American, 37 (13.9%) Native American, 2 (0.8%) Asian, 5 (1.9%) Pacific Islander, 21 (7.9%) from other races, and 18 (6.8%) from two or more races. Hispanic or Latino of any race were 30 persons (11.3%).

The census reported that 95.5% of the population lived in households, 12 people (4.5%) lived in non-institutionalized group quarters, and no one was institutionalized.

There were 106 households, out of which 27 (25.5%) had children under the age of 18 living in them, 38 (35.8%) were married-couple households, 8 (7.5%) were cohabiting couple households, 29 (27.4%) had a female householder with no partner present, and 31 (29.2%) had a male householder with no partner present. 36 households (34.0%) were one person, and 19 (17.9%) were one person aged 65 or older. The average household size was 2.4. There were 66 families (62.3% of all households).

The age distribution was 48 people (18.0%) under the age of 18, 24 people (9.0%) aged 18 to 24, 38 people (14.3%) aged 25 to 44, 66 people (24.8%) aged 45 to 64, and 90 people (33.8%) who were 65 years of age or older. The median age was 53.7 years. For every 100 females, there were 123.5 males.

There were 166 housing units at an average density of 3.3 units per square mile (1.3 units/km^{2}), of which 106 (63.9%) were occupied. Of these, 66 (62.3%) were owner-occupied, and 40 (37.7%) were occupied by renters.

== Politics ==
In the state legislature Hat Creek is in the 1st senatorial district, represented by Republican Megan Dahle, and the 1st Assembly district, represented by Republican Heather Hadwick.

Federally, Hat Creek is in California's 1st congressional district, represented by Republican James Gallagher.
