= Whitmore, California =

Unincorporated community in California, United States

- Unincorporated community Census-designated place
- Location in California Whitmore, California (the United States)
- Coordinates: 40°36′45″N 121°56′09″W
- Country: United States
- State: California
- County: Shasta

Area
  - Total: 6.535 sq mi (16.93 km^{2})
  - Land: 6.529 sq mi (16.91 km^{2})
  - Water: 0.006 sq mi (0.016 km^{2})
- Elevation: 1,975 ft (602 m)

Population (2020)
  - Total: 311
  - Density: 47.6/sq mi (18.4/km^{2})
- Time zone: UTC-8 (Pacific)
  - Summer (DST): UTC-7 (PDT)
- GNIS feature ID: 2813357

Whitmore is an unincorporated community and census-designated place (CDP) in Shasta County, California, United States. Its population is 311 as of the 2020 census.

== History ==
Its zip code is 96096, and wired telephone numbers follow the pattern 530-472-xxxx, which is shared by the neighboring communities of Oak Run, Shingletown, and Millville.

There is one store, as well as a consignment/antique shop known as The Way Station. The store is next to the Whitmore post office.

There are two churches, Whitmore Grace Community Church and Whitmore Seventh-Day Advent.

== Geography ==
=== Climate ===
This region experiences hot and dry summers. According to the Köppen Climate Classification system, Whitmore has a warm-summer Mediterranean climate, abbreviated "CSB" on climate maps.

== Demographics ==
Historical population
Census	Pop.	Note	%±
2020	311		—
U.S. Decennial Census; 1850–1870 1880-1890; 1900 1910 1920; 1930 1940 1950; 1960 1970 1980; 1990 2000 2010; 2020

Whitmore first appeared as a census designated place in the 2020 U.S. census.

=== 2020 Census ===
Whitmore CDP, California – Racial and ethnic composition Note: the US Census treats Hispanic/Latino as an ethnic category. This table excludes Latinos from the racial categories and assigns them to a separate category. Hispanics/Latinos may be of any race.
Race / Ethnicity (NH = Non-Hispanic)	Pop 2020	% 2020
White alone (NH)	246	79.10%
Black or African American alone (NH)	0	0.00%
Native American or Alaska Native alone (NH)	4	1.29%
Asian alone (NH)	13	4.18%
Pacific Islander alone (NH)	1	0.32%
Other race alone (NH)	0	0.00%
Mixed race or Multiracial (NH)	25	8.04%
Hispanic or Latino (any race)	22	7.07%
Total	311	100.00%

== Politics ==
In the California State Legislature, Burbank is in the 1st senatorial district, represented by Republican Megan Dahle, and in the 1st Assembly district, represented by Republican Heather Hadwick.

Federally, Whitmore is in California's 1st congressional district, represented by Republican James Gallagher.

== Notable people ==
Vida Blue used to own ranch land in Whitmore.
