= Shingletown, California =

Shingletown
- Unincorporated Community; Census Designated Place
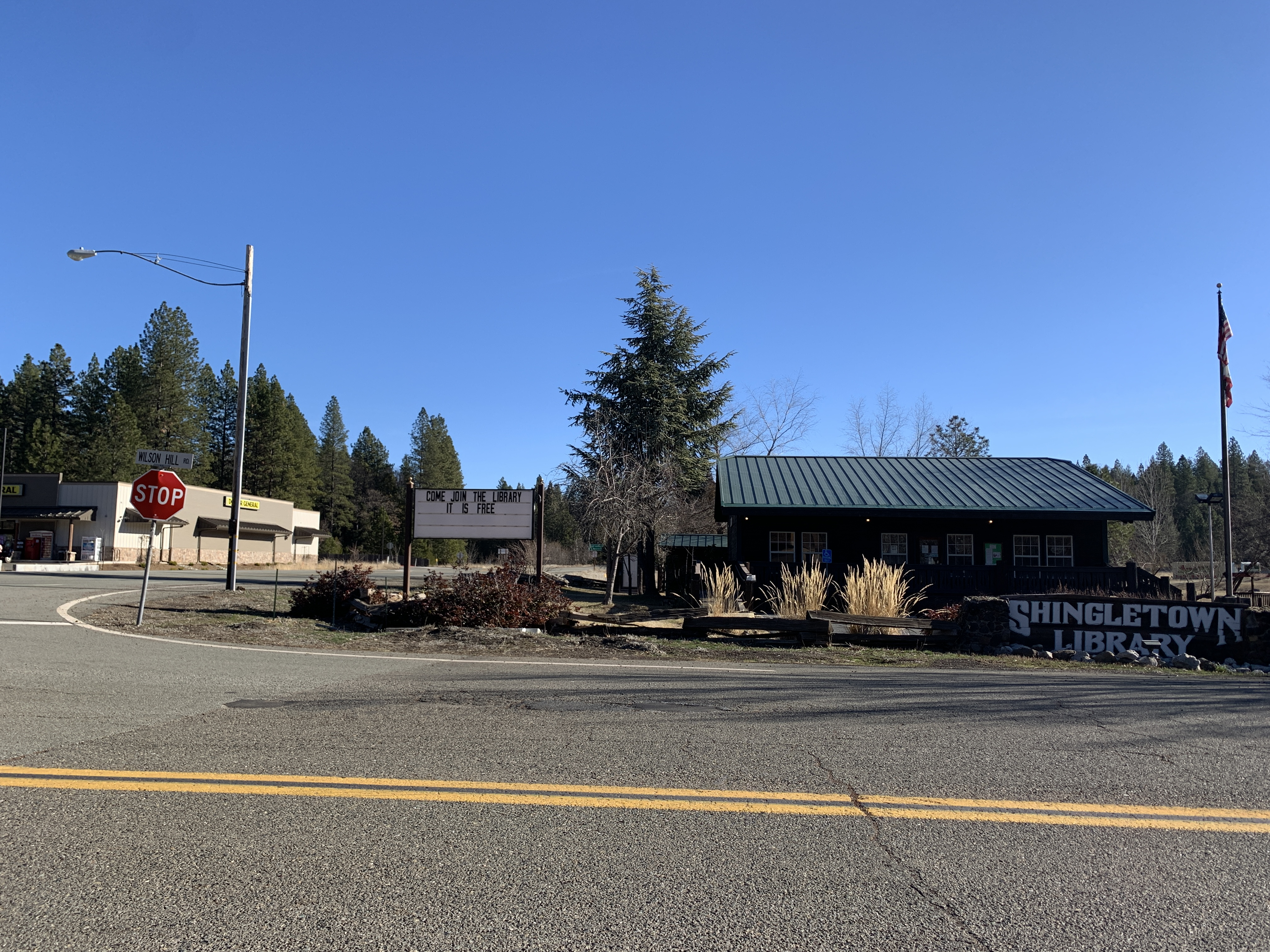

- Location in Shasta County and the state of California

- Location in the United States
- Coordinates: 40°29′46″N 121°51′49″W
- Country: United States
- State: California
- County: Shasta

Area
  - Total: 24.613 sq mi (63.748 km^{2})
  - Land: 24.545 sq mi (63.571 km^{2})
  - Water: 0.069 sq mi (0.178 km^{2}) 0.28%
- Elevation: 3,491 ft (1,064 m)

Population (2020)
  - Total: 2,442
  - Density: 99.49/sq mi (38.41/km^{2})
- Time zone: UTC-8 (Pacific (PST))
  - Summer (DST): UTC-7 (PDT)
- ZIP code: 96088
- Area code: 530
- FIPS code: 06-71568
- GNIS feature ID: 1659646

Shingletown is a census-designated place (CDP) in Shasta County, California, United States. Its population is 2,442, as of the 2020 census.

Shingletown is a town located along California State Route 44 in the hills just below Mount Lassen. Shingletown has a history of logging large timber, including pine, fir and cedar. It is also known as "The Gateway to Lassen".

Shingletown was originally named Shingle Camp, for the workers who cut roofing slats from timber to supply miners during the Gold Rush era.

== Geography ==
Shingletown is located at 40°29′46″N 121°51′49″W, in Northern California, near Lassen Volcanic National Park.

As of 2019, the state of California classifies the population of Shingletown as living in a "Very High fire Hazard Severity Zone". Cal Fire plans to trim 1,124 acres of vegetation along Highway 44, the main road through the town, as the highest priority fire safety project in the state.

== Demographics ==
Historical population
Census	Pop.	Note	%±
2000	2,222		—
2010	2,283		2.7%
2020	2,442		7.0%
U.S. Decennial Census; 1860–1870 1880-1890; 1900 1910 1920; 1930 1940 1950; 1960 1970 1980; 1990 2000 2010

Shingletown first appeared as a census designated place in the 2000 U.S. census.

=== 2020 census ===
As of the 2020 census, Shingletown had a population of 2,442. The population density was 99.5 inhabitants per square mile (38.4/km^{2}). The median age was 57.1 years. The age distribution was 14.8% under the age of 18, 4.1% aged 18 to 24, 16.8% aged 25 to 44, 31.5% aged 45 to 64, and 32.7% who were 65 years of age or older. For every 100 females there were 104.4 males, and for every 100 females age 18 and over there were 103.4 males age 18 and over.

0.0% of residents lived in urban areas, while 100.0% lived in rural areas.

The whole population lived in households. There were 1,090 households, out of which 17.7% included children under the age of 18. Of all households, 50.6% were married-couple households, 7.3% were cohabiting couple households, 21.0% were households with a male householder and no spouse or partner present, and 21.1% were households with a female householder and no spouse or partner present. About 29.0% of all households were made up of individuals and 18.7% had someone living alone who was 65 years of age or older. The average household size was 2.24. There were 692 families (63.5% of all households).

There were 1,298 housing units at an average density of 52.9 units per square mile (20.4 units/km^{2}), of which 1,090 (84.0%) were occupied. Of these, 83.5% were owner-occupied, and 16.5% were occupied by renters. Of all housing units, 16.0% were vacant. The homeowner vacancy rate was 2.4% and the rental vacancy rate was 6.7%.

Racial composition as of the 2020 census
Race	Number	Percent
White	2,095	85.8%
Black or African American	6	0.2%
American Indian and Alaska Native	64	2.6%
Asian	18	0.7%
Native Hawaiian and Other Pacific Islander	7	0.3%
Some other race	39	1.6%
Two or more races	213	8.7%
Hispanic or Latino (of any race)	161	6.6%

=== Income and poverty ===
In 2023, the US Census Bureau estimated that the median household income was $74,242, and the per capita income was $43,574. About 1.4% of families and 10.0% of the population were below the poverty line.

== Politics ==
In the state legislature, Shingletown is located in the 1st senatorial district, represented by Republican Megan Dahle, and the 1st Assembly district, represented by Republican Heather Hadwick.

Federally, Shingletown is in California's 1st congressional district, represented by Republican James Gallagher.

== Economy ==
Shingletown Airport
- IATA: none; ICAO: none; FAA LID: 0Q6

Summary
- Airport type: Closed
- Operator: Shasta County
- Location: Shingletown, California
- Closed: October 1, 2002
- Elevation AMSL: 3,880 ft (1,180 m)
- Coordinates: 40°31′20″N 121°49′04″W
- Interactive map of Shingletown Airport

Runways
Direction	Length		Surface
Direction	ft	m	Surface
1/19	2,340	713	Asphalt
- Sources: county web site

Shingletown is home to KRDG and KYTO, two radio stations covering Redding and the surrounding area.

Shingletown had a public-use general aviation airport (FAA LID: 0Q6) located three miles (5 km) northeast of town. It covered an area of 120 acres (49 ha) and had one runway. It was closed on October 1, 2002, for safety reasons.

== Notable people ==
- Greg Cadaret, former professional baseball player
- Lynsi Snyder, owner of In-N-Out Burger
