= Millville, California =

Millville
- Unincorporated Community; Census Designated Place
- Location in Shasta County and the state of California
- Coordinates: 40°33′21″N 122°11′7″W
- Country: United States
- State: California
- County: Shasta

Area
  - Total: 8.213 sq mi (21.272 km^{2})
  - Land: 8.046 sq mi (20.839 km^{2})
  - Water: 0.167 sq mi (0.433 km^{2}) 2.04%
- Elevation: 515 ft (157 m)

Population (2020)
  - Total: 724
  - Density: 90.0/sq mi (34.7/km^{2})
- Time zone: UTC-8 (Pacific (PST))
  - Summer (DST): UTC-7 (PDT)
- ZIP code: 96062
- Area code: 530
- FIPS code: 06-47724
- GNIS feature ID: 0228775

Millville is a census-designated place (CDP) in Shasta County, California, United States. Its population is 724 as of the 2020 census, down from 727 from the 2010 census.

== Geography ==
Millville is located at 40°33′21″N 122°11′7″W (40.555904, -122.185250).

According to the United States Census Bureau, the CDP has a total area of 8.2 square miles (21 km^{2}), of which 97.96% is land and 2.04% is water.

== Demographics ==
Historical population
Census	Pop.	Note	%±
2000	610		—
2010	727		19.2%
2020	724		−0.4%
U.S. Decennial Census; 1860–1870 1880-1890; 1900 1910 1920; 1930 1940 1950; 1960 1970 1980; 1990 2000 2010

Millville first appeared as a census designated place in the 2000 U.S. census.

=== 2020 ===
The 2020 United States census reported that Millville had a population of 724. The population density was 90.0 inhabitants per square mile (34.7/km^{2}). The racial makeup of Millville was 651 (89.9%) White, 0 (0.0%) African American, 8 (1.1%) Native American, 5 (0.7%) Asian, 1 (0.1%) Pacific Islander, 3 (0.4%) from other races, and 56 (7.7%) from two or more races. Hispanic or Latino of any race were 35 persons (4.8%).

The whole population lived in households. There were 287 households, out of which 72 (25.1%) had children under the age of 18 living in them, 189 (65.9%) were married-couple households, 12 (4.2%) were cohabiting couple households, 48 (16.7%) had a female householder with no partner present, and 38 (13.2%) had a male householder with no partner present. 64 households (22.3%) were one person, and 40 (13.9%) were one person aged 65 or older. The average household size was 2.52. There were 210 families (73.2% of all households).

The age distribution was 150 people (20.7%) under the age of 18, 49 people (6.8%) aged 18 to 24, 114 people (15.7%) aged 25 to 44, 209 people (28.9%) aged 45 to 64, and 202 people (27.9%) who were 65 years of age or older. The median age was 51.2 years. For every 100 females, there were 79.2 males.

There were 311 housing units at an average density of 38.7 units per square mile (14.9 units/km^{2}), of which 287 (92.3%) were occupied. Of these, 253 (88.2%) were owner-occupied, and 34 (11.8%) were occupied by renters.

=== 2010 ===
The 2010 United States census reported that Millville had a population of 727. The population density was 88.5 inhabitants per square mile (34.2/km^{2}). The racial makeup of Millville was 673 (92.6%) White, 0 (0.0%) African American, 6 (0.8%) Native American, 6 (0.8%) Asian, 1 (0.1%) Pacific Islander, 22 (3.0%) from other races, and 19 (2.6%) from two or more races. Hispanic or Latino of any race were 50 persons (6.9%).

The Census reported that 727 people (100% of the population) lived in households, 0 (0%) lived in non-institutionalized group quarters, and 0 (0%) were institutionalized.

There were 268 households, out of which 95 (35.4%) had children under the age of 18 living in them, 180 (67.2%) were opposite-sex married couples living together, 24 (9.0%) had a female householder with no husband present, 11 (4.1%) had a male householder with no wife present. There were 8 (3.0%) unmarried opposite-sex partnerships, and 3 (1.1%) same-sex married couples or partnerships. 44 households (16.4%) were made up of individuals, and 24 (9.0%) had someone living alone who was 65 years of age or older. The average household size was 2.71. There were 215 families (80.2% of all households); the average family size was 3.05.

The population was spread out, with 178 people (24.5%) under the age of 18, 42 people (5.8%) aged 18 to 24, 126 people (17.3%) aged 25 to 44, 246 people (33.8%) aged 45 to 64, and 135 people (18.6%) who were 65 years of age or older. The median age was 47.4 years. For every 100 females, there were 93.9 males. For every 100 females age 18 and over, there were 94.0 males.

There were 287 housing units at an average density of 34.9 per square mile (13.5/km^{2}), of which 230 (85.8%) were owner-occupied, and 38 (14.2%) were occupied by renters. The homeowner vacancy rate was 1.7%; the rental vacancy rate was 5.0%. 623 people (85.7% of the population) lived in owner-occupied housing units and 104 people (14.3%) lived in rental housing units.

=== 2000 ===
As of the census of 2000, the median income for a household in the CDP was $51,406, and the median income for a family was $53,000. Males had a median income of $41,917 versus $27,031 for females. The per capita income for the CDP was $27,218. About 5.9% of families and 7.9% of the population were below the poverty line, including 12.1% of those under age 18 and 2.7% of those age 65 or over.

== Politics ==
In the state legislature Millville is in the 1st senatorial district, represented by Republican Megan Dahle, and the 1st Assembly district, represented by Republican Heather Hadwick.

Federally, Millville is in California's 1st congressional district, represented by Republican James Gallagher.
