= Shasta County, California =

County in California, United States

Shasta County
- County
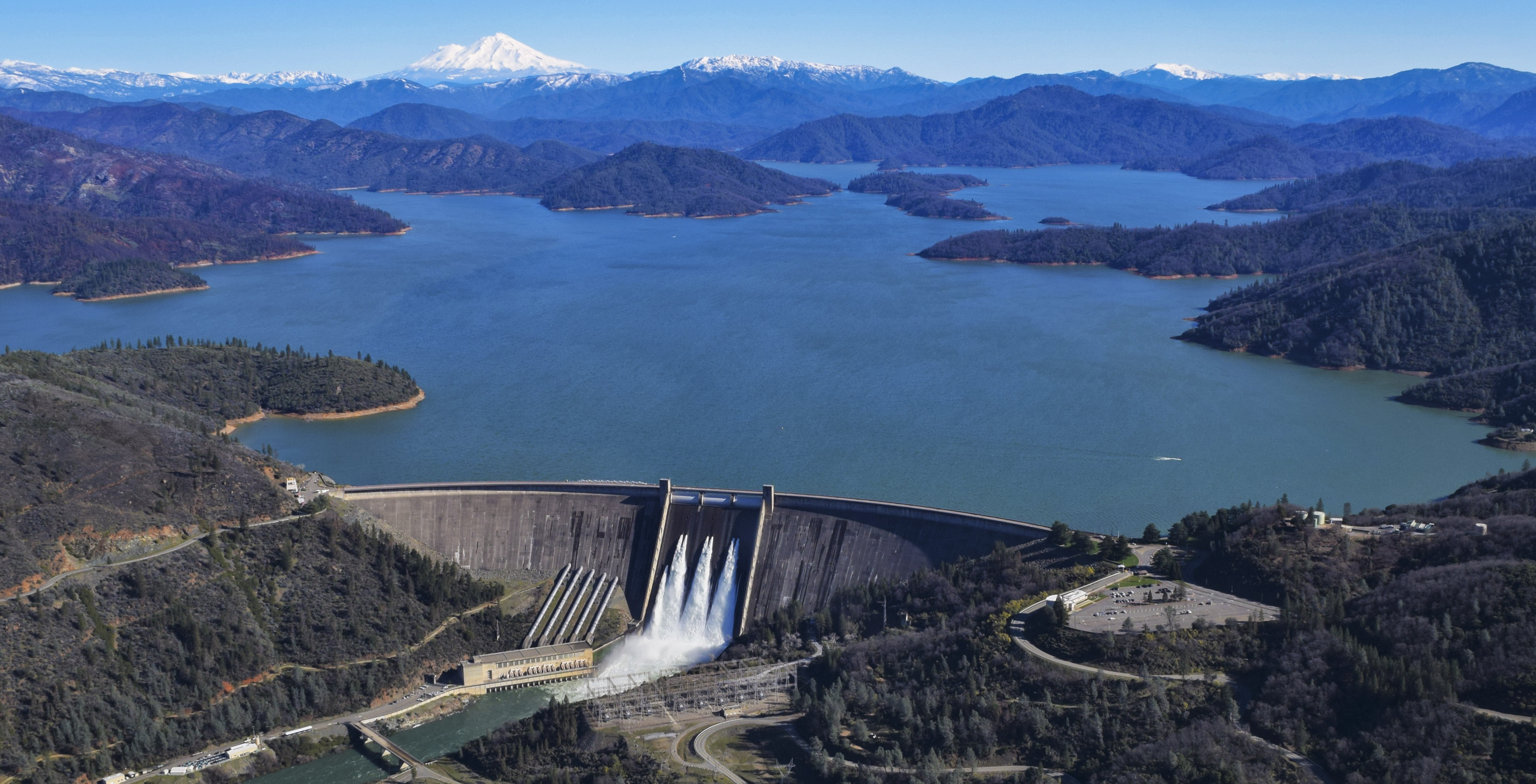
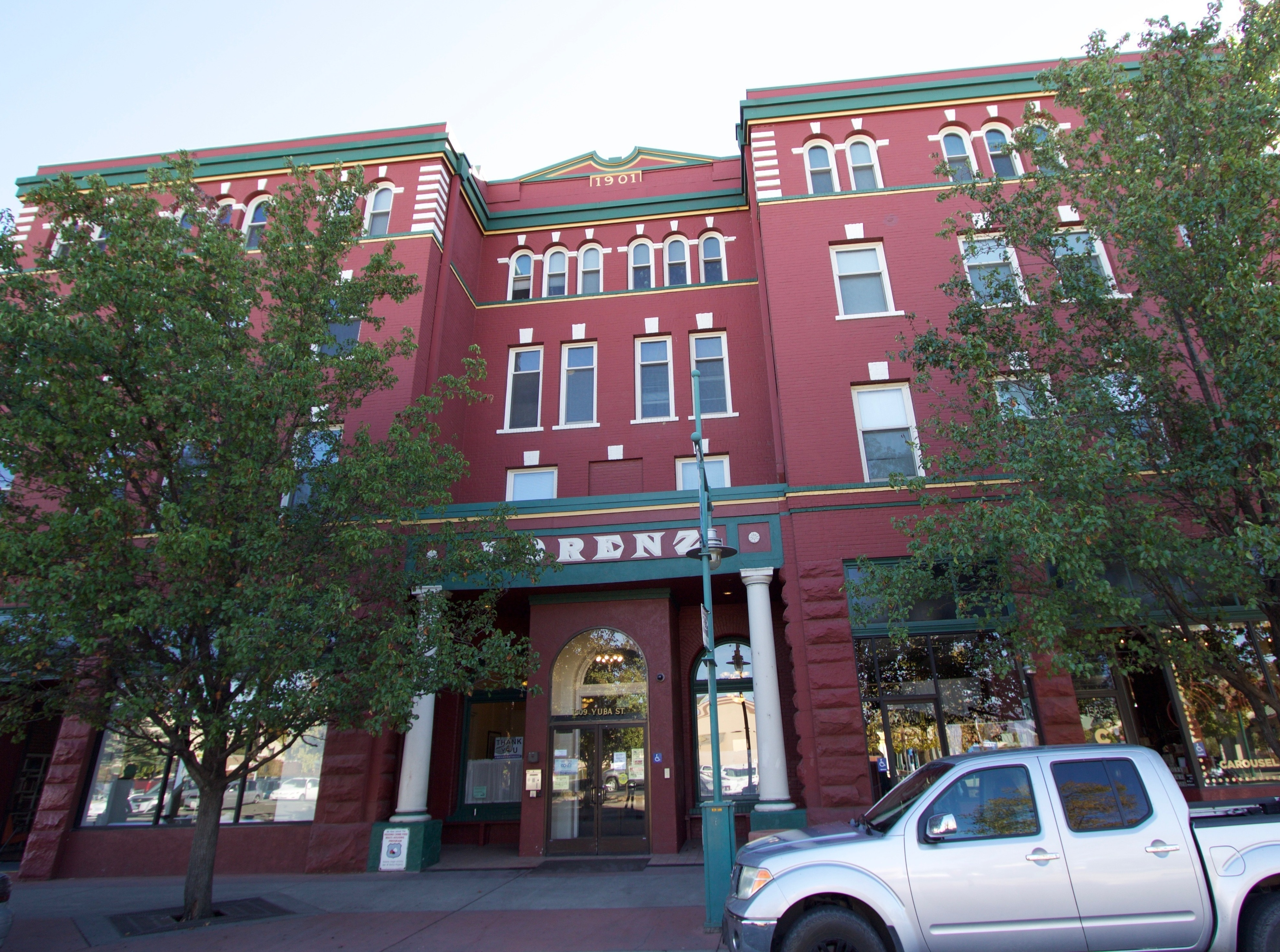
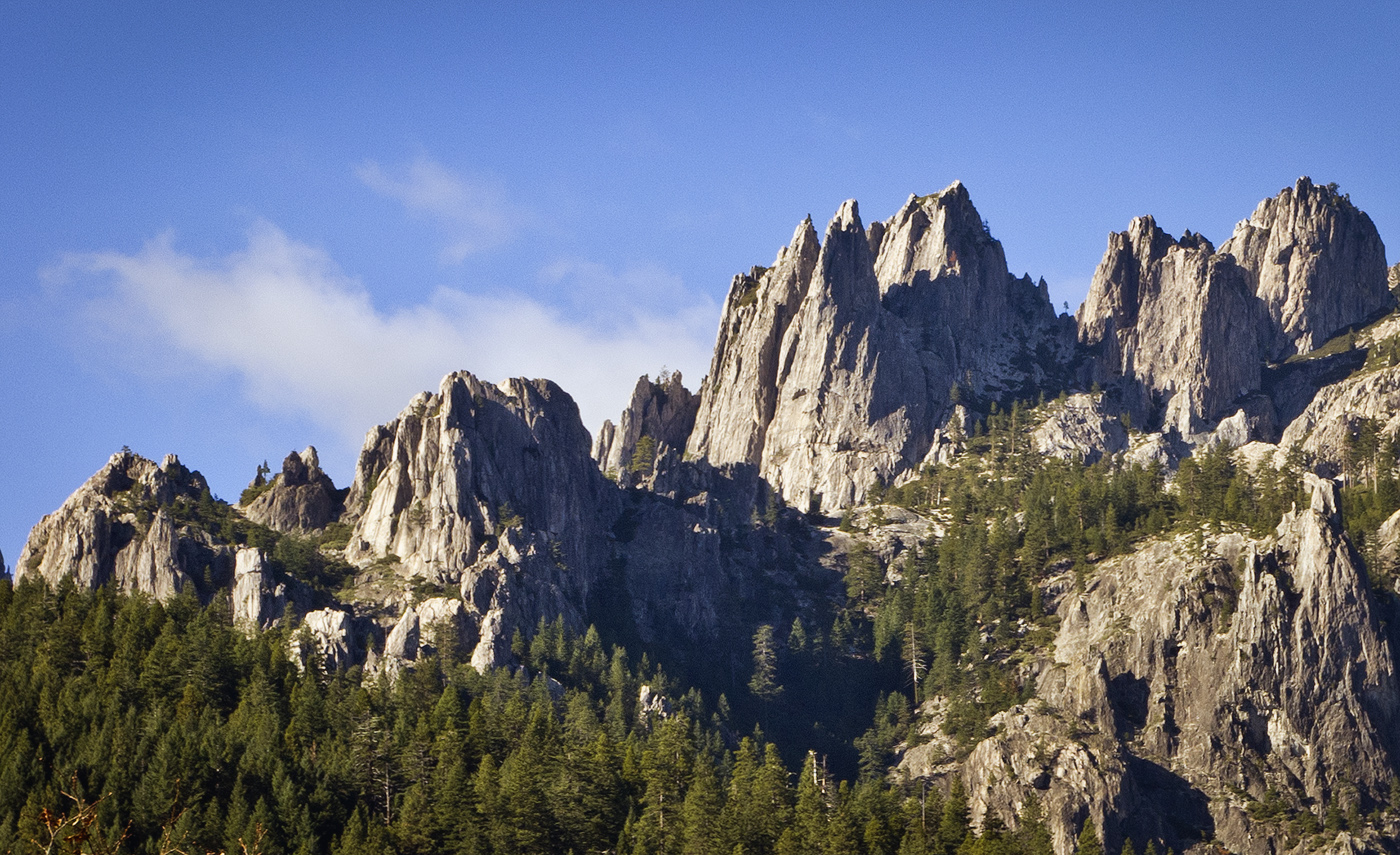
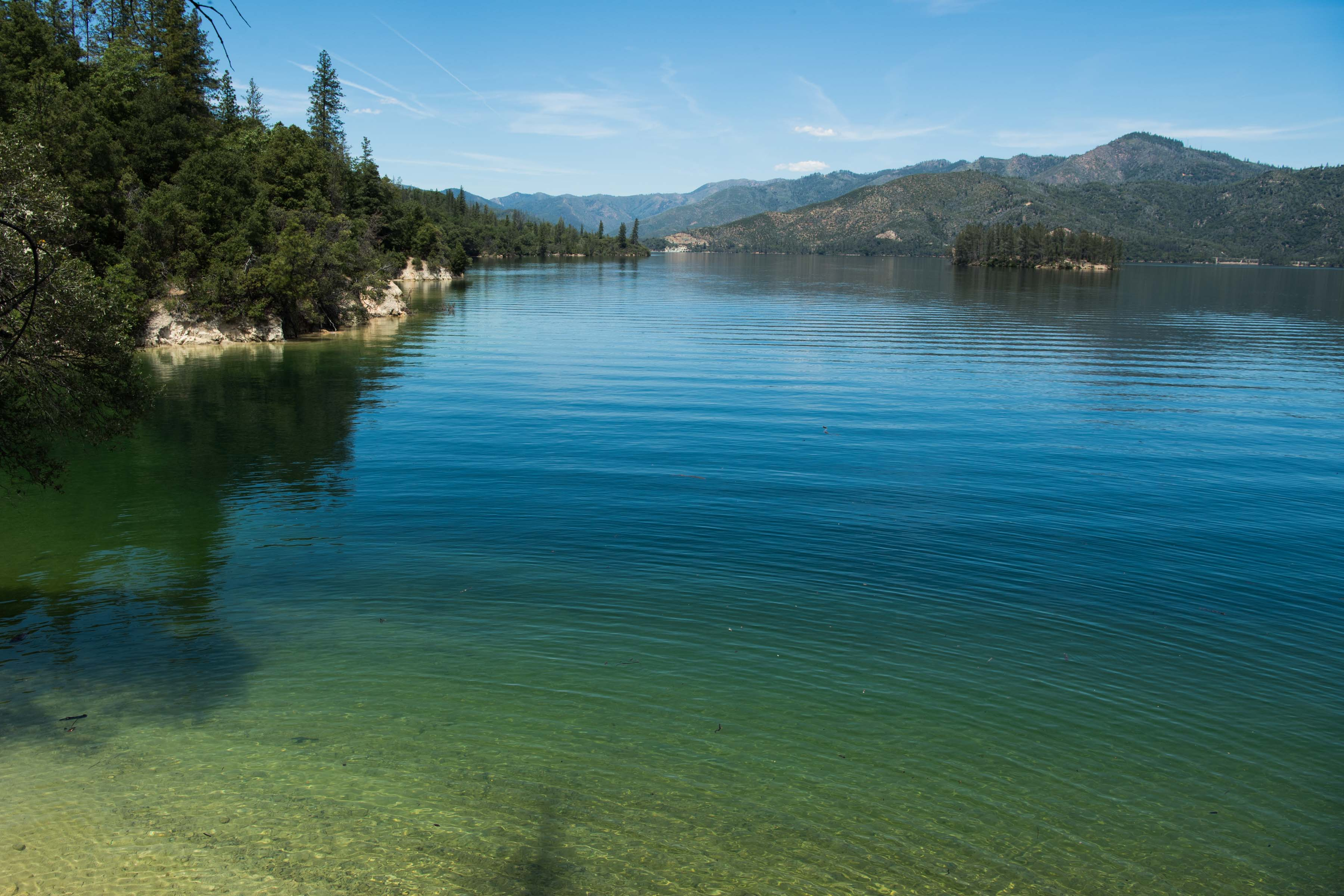
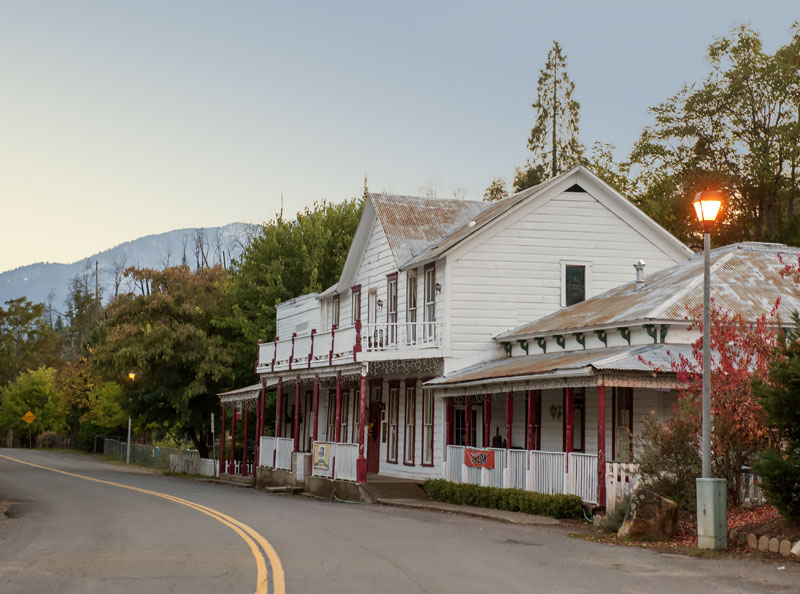
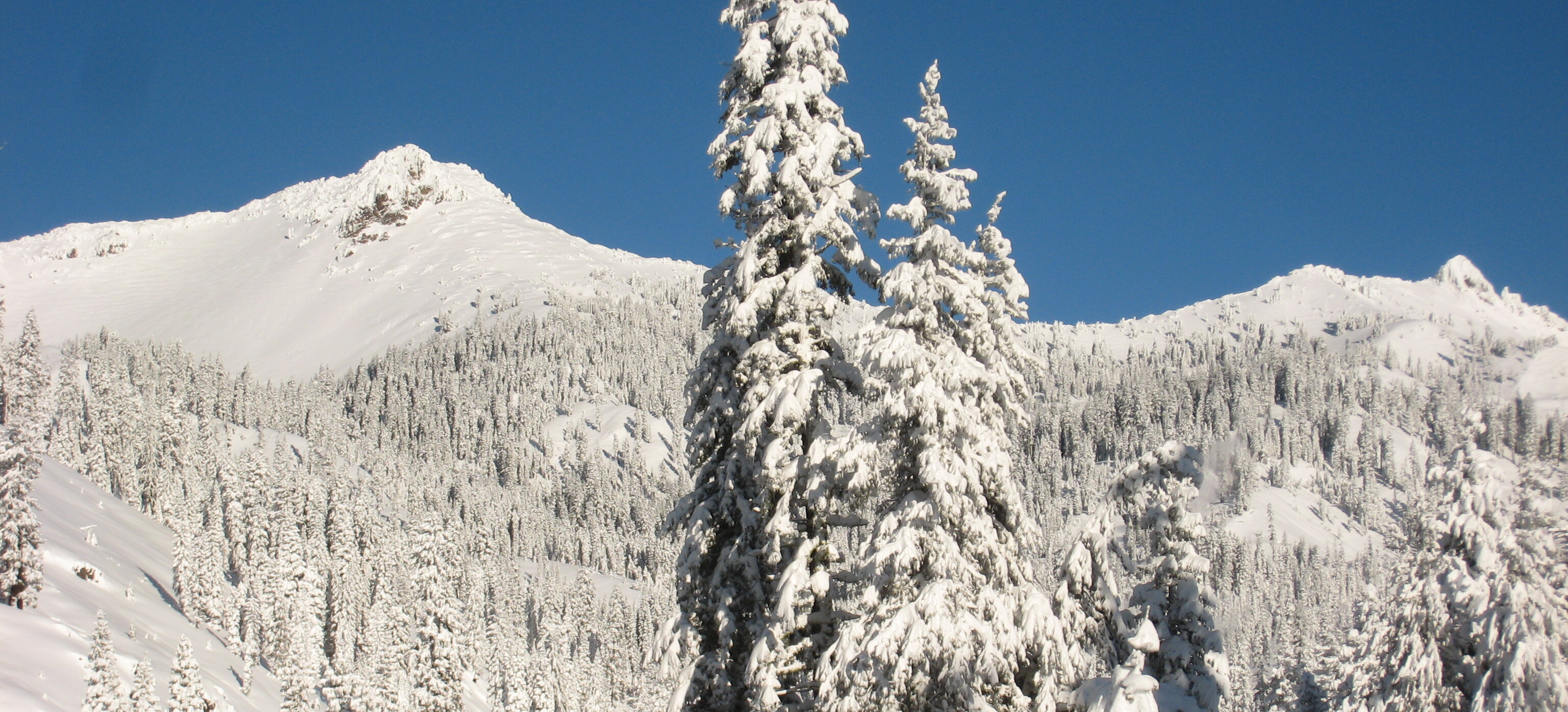
- Lake Shasta and the Shasta Dam Redding Castle Crags Whiskeytown Lake French Gulch Lassen Peak in Lassen Volcanic Park

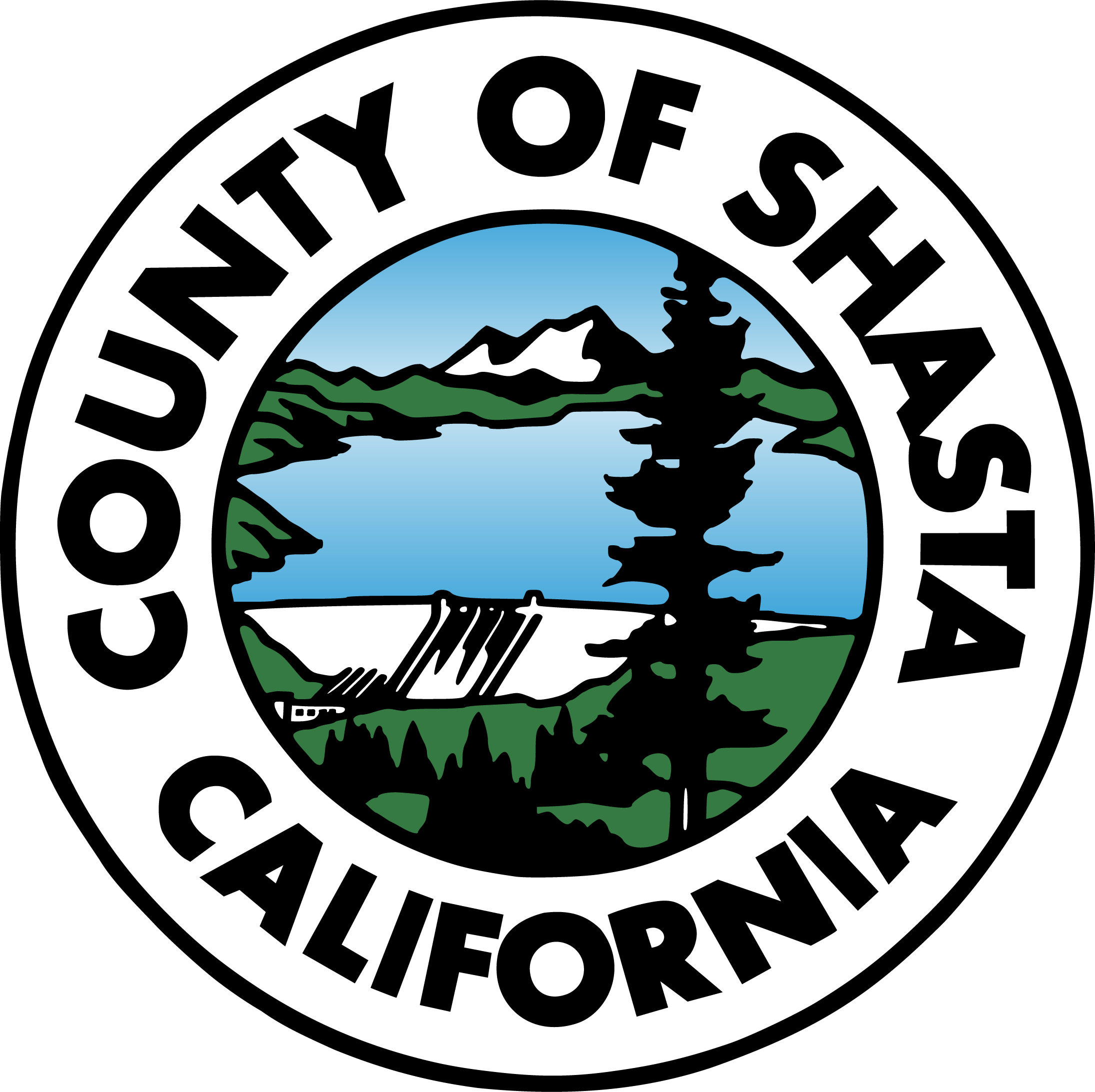
- Seal
- Interactive map of Shasta County
- Location in the state of California
- Coordinates: 40.76°N 122.04°W
- Country: United States
- State: California
- Region: Shasta Cascade
- Incorporated: February 18, 1850
- Named for: Mount Shasta, (Note: Originally, Mount Shasta was within the county, but it is now part of Siskiyou County) which was named after the Shasta people
- County seat: Redding
- Largest city: Redding

Government
  - Type: Council–CEO
  - Chair: Kevin W. Crye
  - Vice Chair: Corkey Harmon
  - Board of Supervisors: Supervisors: Kevin W. Crye; Allen Long; Corkey Harmon; Matt Plummer; Chris Kelstrom
  - County executive officer: David J Rickert
  - Deputy County executive officer: Stewart Buettell

Area
  - Total: 3,847 sq mi (9,960 km^{2})
  - Land: 3,775 sq mi (9,780 km^{2})
  - Water: 72 sq mi (190 km^{2})
- Highest elevation: 10,456 ft (3,187 m)

Population (April 1, 2020)
  - Total: 182,155
  - Estimate (2025): 181,648 ▼
  - Density: 48.25/sq mi (18.63/km^{2})

GDP
  - Total: $9.921 billion (2022)
- Time zone: UTC−8 (Pacific Standard Time)
  - Summer (DST): UTC−7 (Pacific Daylight Time)
- Congressional district: 1st
- Website: www.shastacounty.gov

Shasta County (/ˈʃæstə/), officially the County of Shasta, is a county located in the northern portion of the U.S. state of California. Its population is 182,155 as of the 2020 census, up from 177,223 recorded in 2010. The county seat is Redding. The county is bordered by Modoc County, Lassen County, Siskiyou County, Plumas County, Tehama County and Trinity County.

Shasta County comprises the Redding, California metropolitan statistical area. The county occupies the northern part of the Sacramento Valley, with portions extending into the southern reaches of the Cascade Range. Points of interest in Shasta County include Shasta Lake, Lassen Peak, and the Sundial Bridge.

== History ==
Shasta County was one of the original counties of California, created in 1850 at the time of statehood. The county was named after Mount Shasta. The name is derived from the English equivalent for the Shasta people. Their population declined in the 1850s due to disease, low birth rate, starvation, killings and massacres as white settlers moved in. Before statehood the name of the tribe was spelled in various ways. The process of naming the county determined the present version, Shasta. Throughout most of Shasta County the 14,179-foot (4,322 m) peak of Mount Shasta in adjacent Siskiyou County is visible to the north. The mountain was originally within Shasta County, but a section went toward the formation of Siskiyou County in 1852. Another section contributed to the formation of Tehama County in 1856.

In 1992, the Fountain Fire burned more than 63,000 acres (25,000 ha) and destroyed hundreds of homes and other structures, including large parts of Round Mountain and Montgomery Creek. More than 7,000 people were forced to evacuate. Estimated losses totaled $105.6 million (equivalent to about $211.3 million in 2024).

Shasta has served as the epicenter of the revived Jefferson State proposal since 2016 which wants to have Northern California and Southern Oregon form a new State. The movement is associated with the Republican Party as its supporters argue that the Democratic controlled legislatures of both states have ignored the needs of the rural parts of their states.

The Fountain Wind project, proposed by energy firm ConnectGEN LLC, includes up to 71 wind turbines, 679 feet (207 m) tall, with the capacity to generate 216 megawatts of electricity. In 2021, the Shasta County Planning Commission voted unanimously to reject the project's use permit, followed by an appeal to the Shasta County Board of Supervisors that similarly resulted in a 4–1 vote to deny the appeal. Wildfire risks and firefighting challenges, among other issues, were given as a primary reason for the rejection of the project. In early 2023, ConnectGen resubmitted its application to the California Energy Commission under Assembly Bill 205 which established a new certification program for non-fossil-fuel powered plants of 50 megawatts or more and related facilities.

== Geography ==
According to the U.S. Census Bureau, the county has a total area of 3,847 square miles (9,960 km^{2}), of which 72 square miles (190 km^{2}) (1.9%) are covered by water. Mountains line the county on the east, north, and west. The Sacramento River flows out of the mountains to the north, through the center of the county, and toward the Sacramento Valley to the south.

=== Flora and fauna ===
According to early California botanist and conservationist Willis Linn Jepson, the biota of Shasta County was not explored in a scientific manner until just before 1900. Until the 1920s, the Southern Pacific Railroad Company owned vast tracts of natural grasslands, but during the 1920s, the railroad sold off much of its grassland holdings, leading to the rapid clearing of brush and large-scale conversion from habitat to agricultural uses. Shasta County has extensive forests, which cover over one half the land area with commercially productive forest systems. Common forest alliances include mixed-oak woodland and mixed conifer-oak woodland, as well as Douglas fir forest. Common trees found include white-bark pine, California black oak, and California buckeye.

=== Adjacent counties ===
- Siskiyou County – north
- Modoc County – northeast
- Lassen County – east
- Plumas County – southeast
- Tehama County – south
- Trinity County – west

=== National protected areas ===
- Shasta-Trinity National Forest (part)
- Whiskeytown National Recreation Area (part)

== Demographics ==
Historical population
Census	Pop.	Note	%±
1850	378		—
1860	4,360		1,053.4%
1870	4,173		−4.3%
1880	9,492		127.5%
1890	12,133		27.8%
1900	17,318		42.7%
1910	18,920		9.3%
1920	13,361		−29.4%
1930	13,927		4.2%
1940	28,800		106.8%
1950	36,413		26.4%
1960	59,468		63.3%
1970	77,640		30.6%
1980	115,715		49.0%
1990	147,036		27.1%
2000	163,256		11.0%
2010	177,223		8.6%
2020	182,155		2.8%
2025 (est.)	181,648	▼	−0.3%
U.S. Decennial Census; 1790–1960 1900–1990; 1990–2000 2010–2015

=== 2020 census ===
As of the 2020 census, the county had a population of 182,155. The median age was 42.8 years, 21.2% of residents were under the age of 18, and 22.4% of residents were 65 years of age or older. For every 100 females there were 96.9 males, and for every 100 females age 18 and over there were 94.4 males age 18 and over.

The racial makeup of the county was 78.4% White, 1.0% Black or African American, 2.7% American Indian and Alaska Native, 3.3% Asian, 0.2% Native Hawaiian and Pacific Islander, 3.6% from some other race, and 10.7% from two or more races. Hispanic or Latino residents of any race comprised 10.8% of the population.

66.2% of residents lived in urban areas, while 33.8% lived in rural areas.

There were 72,836 households in the county, of which 27.4% had children under the age of 18 living with them and 27.2% had a female householder with no spouse or partner present. About 27.5% of all households were made up of individuals and 14.0% had someone living alone who was 65 years of age or older.

There were 79,380 housing units, of which 8.2% were vacant. Among occupied housing units, 64.6% were owner-occupied and 35.4% were renter-occupied. The homeowner vacancy rate was 1.7% and the rental vacancy rate was 5.0%.

Shasta County, California – Racial and ethnic composition Note: the US Census treats Hispanic/Latino as an ethnic category. This table excludes Latinos from the racial categories and assigns them to a separate category. Hispanics/Latinos may be of any race.
Race / Ethnicity (NH = Non-Hispanic)	Pop 1980	Pop 1990	Pop 2000	Pop 2010	Pop 2020	% 1980	% 1990	% 2000	% 2010	% 2020
White alone (NH)	108,292	134,001	141,097	146,044	136,894	93.59%	91.13%	86.43%	82.41%	75.15%
Black or African American alone (NH)	717	1,045	1,179	1,438	1,761	0.62%	0.71%	0.72%	0.81%	0.97%
Native American or Alaska Native alone (NH)	2,630	3,646	4,025	4,162	4,047	2.27%	2.48%	2.47%	2.35%	2.22%
Asian alone (NH)	516	2,610	3,014	4,297	5,839	0.45%	1.78%	1.85%	2.42%	3.21%
Native Hawaiian or Pacific Islander alone (NH)	x	x	154	232	323	x	x	0.09%	0.13%	0.18%
Other race alone (NH)	105	82	245	212	1,037	0.09%	0.06%	0.15%	0.12%	0.57%
Mixed race or Multiracial (NH)	x	x	4,544	5,960	12,524	x	x	2.78%	3.36%	6.88%
Hispanic or Latino (any race)	3,455	5,652	8,998	14,878	19,730	2.99%	3.84%	5.51%	8.40%	10.83%
Total	115,715	147,036	163,256	177,223	182,155	100.00%	100.00%	100.00%	100.00%	100.00%

=== American Community Survey 2025 data ===
The United States Census Bureau estimated that in 2025, Shasta County’s population was 181.648. It was also estimated that the county's population was 73,15% Non-Hispanic White, 13,39% Hispanic or Latino, 1,15% Non-Hispanic Black, 3,89% Asian, 2,26% Native American, 0,20% Pacific Islander, and 5,96% Multiracial.

Total	Population	Percentage
Non-Hispanic White	132.875	73,15%
Hispanic or Latino	24.321	13,39%
Non-Hispanic Black	2.084	1,15%
Asian	7.073	3,89%
Native American	4.100	2,26%
Pacific Islander	362	0,20%
Non-Hispanic Multiracial	10.833	5,96%

=== 2010 ===
The 2010 United States census reported that Shasta County had a population of 177,223. The racial makeup of Shasta County was 153,726 (86.7%) White, 1,548 (0.9%) African American, 4,950 (2.8%) Native American, 4,391 (2.5%) Asian, 271 (0.2%) Pacific Islander, 4,501 (2.5%) from other races, and 7,836 (4.4%) from two or more races. Hispanics or Latinos of any race were 14,878 persons (8.4%).

Population reported at 2010 United States census
The County	Total; Population	White	African; American	Native; American	Asian	Pacific; Islander	other races	two or more races	Hispanic or Latino (of any race)
Shasta County	177,223	153,726	1,548	4,950	4,391	271	4,501	7,836	14,878
Incorporated cities and towns	Total; Population	White	African; American	Native; American	Asian	Pacific; Islander	other races	two or more races	Hispanic or Latino (of any race)
Anderson	9,932	8,273	70	426	256	17	353	537	1,070
Redding	89,861	77,117	1,092	2,034	3,034	156	2,307	4,121	7,787
Shasta Lake City	10,164	8,749	67	389	233	13	201	512	865
Census-designated places	Total; Population	White	African; American	Native; American	Asian	Pacific; Islander	other races	two or more races	Hispanic or Latino (of any race)
Bella Vista	2,781	2,559	16	41	30	6	43	86	179
Big Bend	102	85	0	10	0	0	1	6	2
Burney	3,154	2,685	13	233	7	2	61	153	265
Cassel	207	194	0	3	0	0	4	6	6
Cottonwood	3,316	2,844	4	99	108	2	120	139	352
Fall River Mills	573	450	0	30	3	2	56	32	105
French Gulch	346	296	3	15	3	1	8	20	17
Hat Creek	309	239	4	45	2	4	9	6	20
Keswick	451	389	0	23	6	0	4	29	14
Lakehead	461	421	0	13	2	0	3	22	11
McArthur	338	217	0	15	0	0	98	8	119
Millville	727	673	0	6	6	1	22	19	50
Montgomery Creek	163	117	2	16	0	0	9	19	18
Mountain Gate	943	850	7	27	5	0	13	41	49
Old Station	51	49	0	1	0	0	0	1	2
Palo Cedro	1,269	1,164	7	24	6	1	22	45	74
Round Mountain	155	126	1	12	3	1	1	11	12
Shasta	1,771	1,612	11	37	23	1	7	80	56
Shingletown	2,283	2,124	5	49	8	1	13	83	86
Other unincorporated areas	Total; Population	White	African; American	Native; American	Asian	Pacific; Islander	other races	two or more races	Hispanic or Latino (of any race)
All others not CDPs (combined)	47,866	42,493	246	1,402	656	63	1,146	1,860	3,719

=== 2000 ===
As of the census of 2000, 163,256 people, 63,426 households, and 44,017 families were residing in the county. The population density was 43 people per square mile (17 people/km^{2}). The 68,810 housing units had an average density of 18 units per square mile (6.9 units/km^{2}). The racial makeup of the county was 89.3% White, 0.8% African American, 2.8% Native American, 1.9% Asian, 0.1% Pacific Islander, 1.7% from other races, and 3.5% from two or more races. About 5.5% of the population were Hispanic or Latino of any race. About 15.7% were of German, 12.3% English, 11.2% Irish, 9.9% American, and 5.2% Italian ancestry according to Census 2000; 94.0% spoke English and 3.3% Spanish as their first language.

Of the 63,426 households, 31.7% had children under 18 living with them, 53.0% were married couples living together, 11.9% had a female householder with no husband present, and 30.6% were not families. About 24.7% of all households were made up of individuals, and 10.2% had someone living alone who was 65 or older. The average household size was 2.52, and the average family size was 2.98.

In the county, theage distribution was 26.1% under 18, 8.2% from 18 to 24, 25.3% from 25 to 44, 25.2% from 45 to 64, and 15.2% who were 65 or older. The median age was 39 years. For every 100 females, there were 95.1 males. For every 100 females 18 and over, there were 91.2 males.

The median income for a household in the county was $34,335, and for a family was $40,491. Males had a median income of $35,959 versus $24,773 for females. The per capita income for the county was $17,738. About 11.3% of families and 15.4% of the population were below the poverty line, including 21.0% of those under age 18 and 7.3% of those age 65 or over.

== Government ==
Shasta County is a General Law County governed by five member board of supervisors and became a Charter County in September 15 2025. In the United States House of Representatives, Shasta County is in California's 1st congressional district, represented by Republican James Gallagher.

In the California State Legislature, Shasta County is in the 1st senatorial district, represented by Republican Megan Dahle, and the 1st Assembly district, represented by Republican Heather Hadwick.

Shasta at one time favored the Democratic Party in Presidential elections. The economy was shaped by the construction of Shasta Dam, and at one point some 60 percent of its registered voters were pro-labor Democrats. It went Democratic in all but one presidential election from 1932 to 1976, and was one of the few counties in the state to be won by George McGovern. Since 1980, it has become one of the most Republican counties in the state in Presidential and congressional elections. The last Democrat to carry the county in a presidential race was Jimmy Carter in 1976. Indeed, Carter is the last Democrat to manage even 40 percent of the county's vote.

A 2022 successful recall unseated supervisor, Leonard Moty, Redding's ex-police chief who describes himself as a fiscal conservative and social moderate, after enough signatures were collected to have the election. The county's Board of Supervisors shifted to a conservative supermajority in subsequent elections. The board issued a declaration opposing state vaccine mandates and fired the health officer after the change in the makeup of the all Republican board. The Board cancelled its contract with Dominion Voting Systems in 2023 to pursue other options including the possibility of counting votes by hand. The county's contract with Dominion was not up for renewal until 2025. County supervisor Kevin Crye met privately with Mike Lindell in Minnesota before the vote. According to Lindell, they discussed how to run elections without voting machines. State and federal law require that voters with disabilities have access to an electronic voting system. The county selected Hart InterCivic as the new provider of voting equipment.

=== Voter registration statistics ===
Population and registered voters
Total population	177,231	
Registered voters (Note: Percentage of registered voters with respect to total population. Percentages of party members with respect to registered voters follow.)	98,013	55.3%
Democratic	25,957	26.5%
Republican	45,815	46.7%
Democratic–Republican spread	-19,858	-20.2%
Independent	3,620	3.7%
Green	453	0.5%
Libertarian	786	0.8%
Peace and Freedom	268	0.3%
Americans Elect	2	0.0%
Other	344	0.4%
No party preference	20,768	21.2%

==== Cities by population and voter registration ====
Cities by population and voter registration
City	Population	Registered voters	Democratic	Republican	D–R spread	Other	No party preference
Anderson	9,927	45.1%	30.7%	38.8%	-8.1%	11.4%	24.0%
Redding	89,674	53.4%	26.5%	46.7%	-20.2%	8.6%	21.5%
Shasta Lake	10,121	51.0%	29.5%	39.1%	-9.6%	10.9%	24.7%

United States presidential election results for Shasta County, California (Note: This total comprised 1,636 votes for Progressive Theodore Roosevelt (who was official Republican nominee in California), 938 votes for Socialist Eugene V. Debs and 54 votes for Prohibition Party nominee Eugene W. Chafin.)
Year	Republican		Democratic		Third party(ies)	
Year	No.	%	No.	%	No.	%
1880	868	49.46%	877	49.97%	10	0.57%
1884	1,173	51.54%	1,042	45.78%	61	2.68%
1888	1,490	50.70%	1,394	47.43%	55	1.87%
1892	1,234	42.77%	1,137	39.41%	514	17.82%
1896	1,210	37.55%	1,936	60.09%	76	2.36%
1900	1,681	44.70%	1,948	51.79%	132	3.51%
1904	1,891	55.10%	935	27.24%	606	17.66%
1908	1,891	47.61%	1,389	34.97%	692	17.42%
1912	16	0.34%	2,040	43.55%	2,628	56.11%
1916	2,008	37.20%	2,828	52.39%	562	10.41%
1920	2,108	62.07%	1,028	30.27%	260	7.66%
1924	1,951	41.95%	598	12.86%	2,102	45.19%
1928	2,301	52.20%	2,025	45.94%	82	1.86%
1932	1,382	23.90%	4,170	72.12%	230	3.98%
1936	2,159	28.75%	5,236	69.72%	115	1.53%
1940	3,909	30.70%	8,662	68.03%	162	1.27%
1944	4,023	40.87%	5,798	58.90%	22	0.22%
1948	5,010	39.69%	7,177	56.86%	436	3.45%
1952	10,073	56.43%	7,656	42.89%	122	0.68%
1956	8,833	43.84%	11,239	55.78%	77	0.38%
1960	9,462	38.94%	14,691	60.45%	148	0.61%
1964	9,178	32.37%	19,142	67.52%	30	0.11%
1968	11,821	40.44%	14,510	49.64%	2,899	9.92%
1972	16,618	46.68%	17,214	48.35%	1,771	4.97%
1976	17,273	45.63%	19,200	50.72%	1,381	3.65%
1980	27,547	58.09%	15,364	32.40%	4,507	9.50%
1984	33,041	62.19%	19,298	36.32%	788	1.48%
1988	32,402	59.36%	21,171	38.79%	1,012	1.85%
1992	28,190	41.24%	21,605	31.61%	18,564	27.16%
1996	34,736	55.17%	20,848	33.11%	7,377	11.72%
2000	43,278	65.04%	20,127	30.25%	3,139	4.72%
2004	52,249	67.22%	24,339	31.31%	1,143	1.47%
2008	49,588	61.68%	28,867	35.91%	1,935	2.41%
2012	48,067	62.97%	25,819	33.82%	2,449	3.21%
2016	51,778	64.68%	22,301	27.86%	5,974	7.46%
2020	60,789	65.41%	30,000	32.28%	2,141	2.30%
2024	59,539	66.96%	27,130	30.51%	2,250	2.53%

== Transportation ==
=== Major highways ===
- Interstate 5
- State Route 36
- State Route 44
- State Route 89
- State Route 151
- State Route 273
- State Route 299

=== Public transportation ===
Redding Area Bus Authority (RABA) provides service in and around Redding. One route operates to Burney via State Route 299.

Amtrak's Coast Starlight serves Redding Station once a day in each direction.

Amtrak Thruway provides twice daily service from Redding to/from Stockton or Sacramento for connections to the Gold Runner, which serve the San Francisco Bay Area, San Joaquin Valley and the Los Angeles area via rail and bus connections.

=== Airports ===
Redding Municipal Airport has scheduled passenger flights. Other (general aviation) airports within the county include Benton Field (near Redding), Fall River Mills Airport, and Shingletown Airport.

== Law enforcement ==
The Shasta County sheriff provides prison administration and coroner services for the entire county, and patrol, investigative, and coroner services for the unincorporated portions of the county.

Redding and Anderson have municipal police departments.

=== Crime ===
The following table includes the number of incidents reported and the rate per 1,000 persons for each type of offense.

Population and crime rates
Population	177,231	
Violent crime	1,280	7.22
Homicide	3	0.02
Forcible rape	111	0.63
Robbery	130	0.73
Aggravated assault	1,036	5.85
Property crime	2,722	15.36
Burglary	1,462	8.25
Larceny-theft (Note: Only larceny-theft cases involving property over $400 in value are reported as property crimes.)	2,839	16.02
Motor vehicle theft	339	1.91
Arson	27	0.15

Cities by population and crime rates
City	Population	Violent crimes	Violent crime rate per 1,000 persons	Property crimes	Property crime rate per 1,000 persons
Anderson	10,056	87	8.65	606	60.26
Redding	90,974	705	7.75	4,380	48.15

== Education ==
School districts include:

Unified:

- Fall River Joint Unified School District
- Gateway Unified School District

Secondary:

- Anderson Union High School District
- Dunsmuir Joint Union High School District
- Red Bluff Joint Union High School District
- Shasta Union High School District

Elementary:

- Antelope Elementary School District
- Bella Vista Elementary School District
- Black Butte Union Elementary School District
- Cascade Union Elementary School District
- Castle Rock Union Elementary School District
- Columbia Elementary School District
- Cottonwood Union Elementary School District
- Enterprise Elementary School District
- French Gulch-Whiskeytown Elementary School District
- Grant Elementary School District
- Happy Valley Union Elementary School District
- Igo, Ono, Platina Union Elementary School District
- Indian Springs Elementary School District
- Junction Elementary School District
- Millville Elementary School District
- Mountain Union Elementary School District
- North Cow Creek Elementary School District
- Oak Run Elementary School District
- Pacheco Union Elementary School District
- Redding Elementary School District
- Shasta Union Elementary School District
- Whitmore Union Elementary School District

=== High schools and below ===
- 43 elementary schools
- 10 junior high schools
- 8 high schools
- 35 private schools

=== Colleges and universities ===
Shasta County has four colleges and universities:

- Shasta College, Redding: 2-year, fully accredited
- Simpson University, Redding: 4-year, fully accredited
- National University, Redding: 4-year, fully accredited
- Shasta Bible College: 4-year

== Points of interest ==
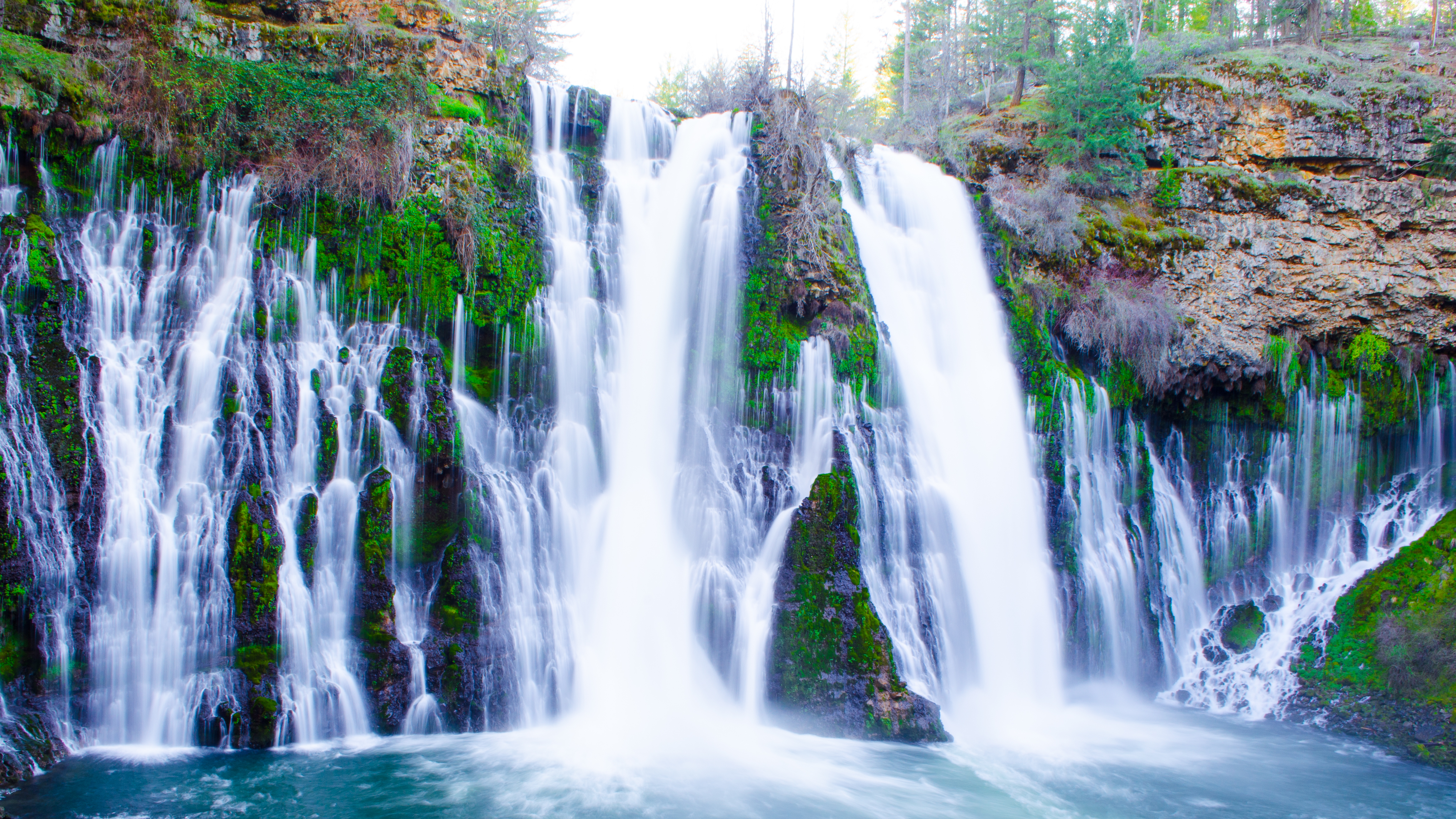
Burney Falls in McArthur-Burney Falls Memorial State Park, in April

- Shasta Dam - second-largest dam in US
- Lassen Peak
- Lassen Volcanic National Park
- Shasta Lake
- Turtle Bay Exploration Park
- Hat Creek Radio Observatory
- Iron Mountain Mine - one of the nation's most toxic waste sites
- Sundial Bridge/Turtle Bay, an architectural beauty and a natural habitat area surrounded by urbanization
- Burney Falls
- Whiskeytown Dam and Lake, with John F. Kennedy Memorial

== Annual events ==
- Kool April Nites (April): A classic car show
- Rodeo Week Festivities (May)
- Art Fair and Fiddler's Jamboree (May)
- Whiskeytown Regatta (May)
- Watershed Festival (May)
- Strawberry Festival (May)
- Shasta Dragonwood Celtic Faire (May)
- Redding Exchange Club Air Show (June)
- Shasta District Fair (June)
- Fall River Valley Century Bike Ride (July)
- Fourth of July Fireworks Celebration (July)
- Burney Basin Days (July)
- Fall River Valley Wild Rice Festival (Aug)
- Intermountain Fair, Fall River Valley (September) The Shasta County Fair
- Stillwater Pow Wow (September)
- Walk To End Alzheimer's (September)
- Big Bike Weekend (October)
- Fall River Valley Lights of Christmas Parade (December)
- Palo Cedro Honey Bee Festival (September)

== Communities ==
=== Cities ===
- Anderson
- Redding
- Shasta Lake

=== Unincorporated communities ===
- Beegum
- Bella Vista (Note: For statistical purposes, defined by the United States Census Bureau as a census-designated place (CDP).)
- Big Bend
- Burney
- Cassel
- Castella
- Centerville
- Cottonwood
- Dana
- Enterprise
- Fall River Mills
- French Gulch
- Happy Valley
- Hat Creek
- Igo
- Ingot
- Johnson Park
- Jones Valley
- Keswick
- Lakehead
- McArthur
- Millville
- Montgomery Creek
- Motion
- Mountain Gate
- Oak Run
- O'Brien
- Old Station
- Ono
- Palo Cedro
- Platina
- Pollard Flat
- Round Mountain
- Shasta
- Shingletown
- Viola
- Whiskeytown
- Whitmore

=== Population ranking ===
The population ranking of the following table is based on the 2020 census of Shasta County. † county seat

Rank	City/Town/etc.	Municipal type	Population (2020 Census)
1	† Redding	City	93,611
2	Anderson	City	11,323
3	Shasta Lake	City	10,371
4	Cottonwood	CDP	6,268
5	Happy Valley	CDP	4,949
6	Bella Vista	CDP	3,641
7	Burney	CDP	3,000
8	Palo Cedro	CDP	2,931
9	Shingletown	CDP	2,442
10	Jones Valley	CDP	1,160
11	Shasta	CDP	1,043
12	Mountain Gate	CDP	815
13	Millville	CDP	724
14	Johnson Park	CDP	686
15	Fall River Mills	CDP	616
16	Lakehead	CDP	469
17	French Gulch	CDP	373
18	McArthur	CDP	334
19	Whitmore	CDP	311
20	Hat Creek	CDP	266
21	Castella	CDP	214
22	Cassel	CDP	207
23	Keswick	CDP	188
24	Montgomery Creek	CDP	176
25	Round Mountain	CDP	160
26	Oak Run	CDP	158
27	Igo	CDP	103
28	Ono	CDP	93
29	Big Bend	CDP	79
30	Old Station	CDP	64
31	Redding Rancheria	AIAN	40
32	Montgomery Creek Rancheria	AIAN	33
33	Roaring Creek Rancheria	AIAN	19
34	Platina	CDP	13
33	Big Bend Rancheria	AIAN	5

== See also ==
- List of school districts in Shasta County, California
- National Register of Historic Places listings in Shasta County, California
- 2018 Shasta County Wildfires: Carr Fire, Hirz Fire, Delta Fire
