= Fort Reading =

Historical place in Shasta County, United States

- Cow Creek near the site of the former Fort Reading

- Location within California Location within the United States
- 40.47°N 122.23°W
- Location: Anderson, California

History
- Built: 1861

Site notes
- Architect: United States Army

California Historical Landmark
- Designated: January 3, 1944
- Reference no.: 379

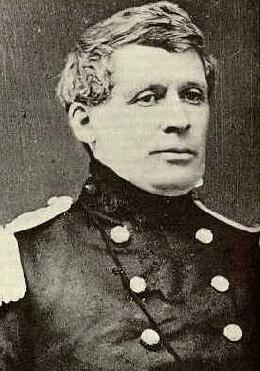
General George Wright, head of Fort Reading

Fort Reading is a historical site in Anderson, California in Shasta County. Fort Reading site is a California Historical Landmark No. 379 listed on March 31, 1933. Founded on January 3, 1844, on west side of Cow Creek, Fort Reading was built to protect the settlers, California Gold Rush miners and travelers in the area. Fort Reading was founded by United States Army by Second Lieutenant E. N. Davis, Co. E, 2nd Infantry. Davis was sent to build the fort by Lieutenant Colonel George M. Wright. At the time the large fort was the first fort in Northern California. The fort was built in 10 acres of land that had been cleared for good visibility. Fort Reading was named after Pierson Barton Reading. Most of the larger base of troops was removed on April 1, 1856. The second draw down of troops was on June 13, 1867. The Fort Reading was completely abandoned on April 6, 1870. The Cow Creek would flood some years, flooding the fort sometimes. No trace of Fort Reading remains.

The marker at the site of the Fort Reading was placed there in 1934 by the U.S. Army and the Shasta Historical Society.

== See also ==
- California Historical Landmarks in Shasta County
