= California Historical Landmarks in Shasta County =

This list includes properties and districts listed on the California Historical Landmark listing in Shasta County, California. Click the "Map of all coordinates" link to the right to view a Google map of all properties and districts with latitude and longitude coordinates in the table below.

Image		Landmark name	Location	City or town	Summary
Bass Hill	148	Bass Hill	Castle Crags State Park; 40°45′15″N 122°19′23″W	Central Valley	California-Oregon Stagecoach Company road on Bass Hill
Battle Rock	116	Battle Rock	Castle Crags State Park; 41°08′54″N 122°19′17″W	Castella	
Bell's Bridge	519	Bell's Bridge	Hwy 99 & Clear Creek Rd. 40°31′00″N 122°22′54″W	Redding	
Clear Creek	78	Clear Creek	Old Hwy 99 and Canyon Rd. 40°35′32″N 122°28′40″W	Redding	Pierson B. Reading gold find site
Dersch Homestead	120	Dersch Homestead	Dersch Rd. at Bear Creek; 40°29′10″N 122°09′03″W	Anderson	
Fort Crook	355	Fort Crook	McArthur Rd. & Soldier Mountain Dr. 41°05′19″N 121°30′52″W	Glenburn	
Fort Reading	379	Fort Reading	Deschutes and Dersch Rds. 40°28′35″N 122°13′49″W	Anderson	
Foundation of Catholic Basilica	483	Foundation of Catholic Basilica	Red Bluff Rd and Crocker Alley; 40°35′34″N 122°29′19″W	Shasta	
French Gulch	166	French Gulch	Historic district 40°41′58″N 122°38′19″W	French Gulch	
Lockhart Ferry	555	Lockhart Ferry	State Hwy 299; 41°00′09″N 121°26′38″W	Fall River Mills	
Noble Pass Route	11	Noble Pass Route	Lassen Volcanic National Park; 40°33′29″N 121°31′54″W		
Old California-Oregon Road	58	Old California-Oregon Road	NW corner of Hwy 273 and Spring Gulch Rd. 40°27′57″N 122°19′30″W	Anderson	
Old town of Shasta	77	Old town of Shasta	Shasta State Historic Park; 40°35′56″N 122°29′32″W	Shasta	Also on the NRHP list as NPS-71000199
Pioneer baby's grave	377	Pioneer baby's grave	State Hwy 299; 40°36′14″N 122°29′58″W	Shasta	
Reading Adobe	10	Reading Adobe	Reading Island Park, 213 Adobe Rd. 40°22′17″N 122°17′01″W	Cottonwood	
Reading's Bar	32	Reading's Bar	Clear Creek Bridge; 40°29′41″N 122°29′50″W	Redding	Also the site of Clear Creek Diggings-Horsetown.
Site of first school in Fall River Valley	759	Site of first school in Fall River Valley	State Hwy 299; 41°04′15″N 121°20′15″W	McArthur	
Southern Hotel & Stage Station	33	Southern Hotel & Stage Station	On old Hwy 99, 0.7 mi SW of Sims exit 41°04′01″N 122°21′42″W	Castella	
Whiskeytown	131	Whiskeytown	Whiskey Creek Rd. & State Hwy 299; 40°38′05″N 122°33′40″W	Whiskeytown	The site of Whiskeytown is under Whiskeytown Lake, marker is by the lake.

== See also ==
- List of California Historical Landmarks
- National Register of Historic Places listings in Shasta County, California
