= Delta, California =

Dog Creek, California
- Delta in winter 1886

- Location within California Location within the United States
- 40.9441°N 122.42633°W
- Location: Delta Road and I-5, on West bank of Sacramento River, Train Stop

History
- Built: 1884

Site notes
- Architectural style: California & Oregon Railroad town

Dog Creek (Town and Stream)
- Interactive map of Dog Creek (Town and Stream)
- 40.9366°N 122.4459°W
- Location: Dog Creek Road, 3 miles west of Delta

History
- Built: 1855`

Site notes
- Architectural style: Mining town then lumber town

Dog Creek was a mining town founded in 1855 at the site of the Dog Creek stream near where it flowed into the Sacramento River. Dog Creek was 25 miles north of Redding in the Sacramento River Canyon. The US Post Office at Dog Creek closed in 1880 and moved to Slate Creek. Near to Dog Creek was the railroad town of Delta; for approximately two years it was the terminus of the California & Oregon Railroad. The railroad line sold land lots at Delta and they sold quickly from $45 to $185 each (today's money` $1,400 to $5,700). Almost overnight the town had McDowell Store, McDowell saloon, Kimball cafe, Kimball saloon, Stone saloon-hotel, a train engine house, a Train station, railway turntable, Wells Fargo Express Office, Central Hotel (Wiley's hotel), cattle yard, water tower and a corral. A Dog Creek water system was built for city water. The train ride to Reading was two hours, 20 minutes, over 39 miles. While the railroad called the new town Delta, many still called the town Dog Creek, as Dog Creek was just a few miles to the west and the land of Delta was in the area called Dog Creek. The largest home in Dog Creek was the Vollmers Home on the Vollmers Ranch, built by J. W. Vollmers and inherited by Shelby and Paul Vollmers. Vollmers Ranch also operated the Vollmers Hotel, one mile west of Delta. Vollmers operated a gas station till 1945, when I-5 was built on it. Vollmers' operations were called Bayles as the post office moved there in 1885. Dr. Autenreith operated the Autenreith Ranch and Store, one-quarter of a mile north of Delta. In 1887, the rail line continued up the river and Delta slowly became a ghost town; the post office closed in 1954, as the town was gone. March 8, 1899 Delta School opened, replaced with a new one in 1939. In 1926 the toll road in the town heading up Dog Creek, ended as toll road and became Dog Creek Road. The Delta grew to become the Delta Mining District in the Shasta-Trinity National Forest. Placer mining was done on Dog Creek in the 1850s and 1860. The largest operator was the Delta Consolidated Mining Company that ran lode gold mine from the 1890s till the early 1920s. The Delta gold mine operated in the Dog Creek mining district, seven miles west of Delta, on Upper Dog Creek. The Delta Consolidated Mining Company had 6.5 -mile-long narrow-gauge railroad, that ran to the Southern Pacific Railroad. In Delta was the one-room school for all the children in the nearby districts, it is one of the few buildings still standing, but has been enlarged over the years. In 1858 the Simeon and Sarah Southern moved to Dog Creek and opened an inn with J.S. Cameron. Dog Creek joined with Hazel Creek, 14 miles north to form the Sugar Loaf Township. With the combined tax income they were able to hire Simeon (Sims) Southern has Justice of the peace for the Sugar Loaf Township. Sims move north to Hazel Creek and opened the historic Southern Hotel & Stage Station in 1859.

== See also ==
- California Historical Landmarks in Shasta County
- Delta Consolidated Mining Company
