= Mark Parent (baseball) =

American baseball player and coach (born 1961)

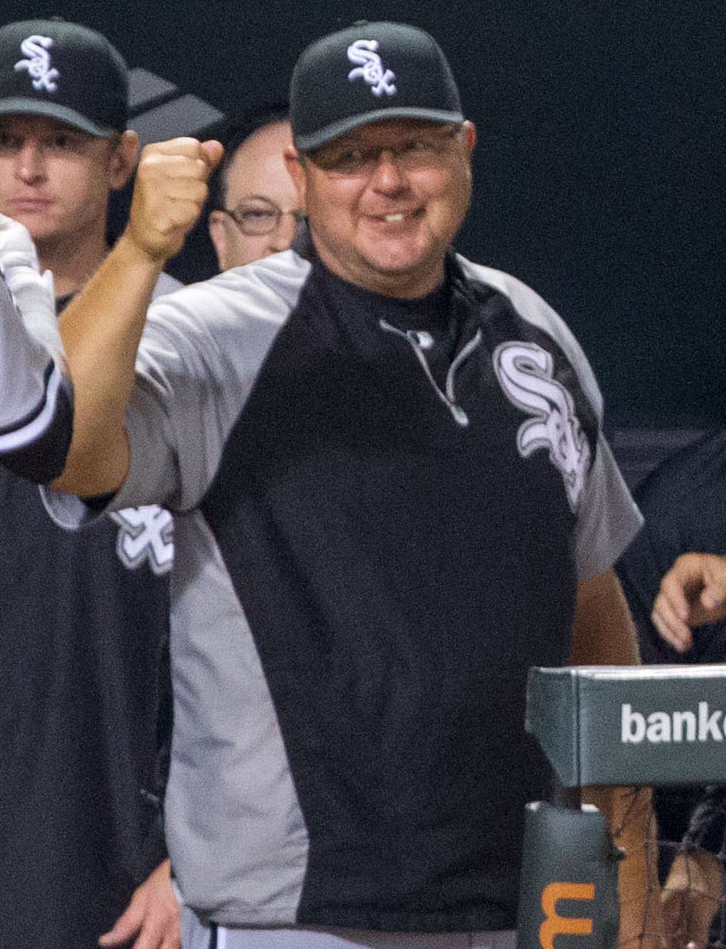
- Parent with the Chicago White Sox in 2012
- Catcher
- Born: September 16, 1961 (age 65); Ashland, Oregon, U.S.
- Batted: Right Threw: Right

MLB debut
- September 20, 1986, for the San Diego Padres

Last MLB appearance
- September 1, 1998, for the Philadelphia Phillies

MLB statistics
- Batting average: .214
- Home runs: 53
- Runs batted in: 168
- Stats at Baseball Reference

Teams
- San Diego Padres (1986–1990); Texas Rangers (1991); Baltimore Orioles (1992–1993); Chicago Cubs (1994); Pittsburgh Pirates (1995); Chicago Cubs (1995); Detroit Tigers (1996); Baltimore Orioles (1996); Philadelphia Phillies (1997–1998)

Mark Alan Parent (/ˈpɛərɛnt/ PAIR-ent; born September 16, 1961) is a former Major League Baseball catcher who played from 1986 to 1998 and was the bench coach for the Chicago White Sox from 2012 to 2015.

== Minor league career ==
After graduating from Anderson Union High School in Anderson, California, he was drafted by the San Diego Padres in the 4th round (92nd overall) of the 1979 MLB draft and played in the minor leagues, starting with the Northwest League's Walla Walla Padres, for eight years before being sent to the Padres.

== Major league career ==
On September 15, 1996, Parent's home run off of Detroit Tigers pitcher Todd Van Poppel was the Orioles' 241st of the year, surpassing the record of 240, set by the 1961 New York Yankees. Parent would make his first and only playoff appearance with the Orioles in 1996, who made it all the way to the American League Championship Series.

Parent's best offensive season would come in 1995 when he played for the Pittsburgh Pirates before being traded back to the Chicago Cubs. During this season he played in 81 Games, and had 265 At Bats, 62 Hits, 30 Runs, 11 Doubles, 18 Home Runs, 38 RBI, while Hitting .234 and Slugging .479.

In 13 seasons he played in 474 Games and had 1,303 At Bats, 112 Runs, 279 Hits, 50 Doubles, 53 Home Runs, 168 RBI, 3 Stolen Bases, 98 Walks, .214 Batting Average, .268 On-base percentage, .375 Slugging Percentage, 488 Total Bases, 12 Sacrifice Hits, 13 Sacrifice Flies and 8 Intentional Walks.

== Managerial and coaching career ==
In 2000, Parent was named manager of the Lancaster JetHawks, Class A affiliate of the Seattle Mariners. Parent was also named California League Manager of the Year that season.

In 2005, Parent was named the first-ever manager of the newly minted Golden Baseball League's Chico Outlaws and took his team to the league championship in 2007. After the team won the title, he retired from professional baseball.

On December 15, 2009, the Philadelphia Phillies named Parent manager of the Lakewood BlueClaws, the franchise's Class A affiliate in the South Atlantic League.

On November 22, 2010, the Philadelphia Phillies named Parent manager of the Reading Phillies, the franchise's Class AA affiliate in the Eastern League. The Official Site of Minor League Baseball

On October 31, 2011, the Chicago White Sox named Parent bench coach under manager Robin Ventura.

On August 25, 2013, Parent was ejected from the Rangers-White Sox game during the pregame line up exchanges at home plate.

On October 2, 2015, the Chicago White Sox relieved Parent of his duties.

On January 11, 2016, the Los Angeles Angels of Anaheim named Parent manager of the Arkansas Travelers, the franchise’s Class AA affiliate in the Texas League.

On September 20, 2016, the Los Angeles Angels of Anaheim announced a two-year player development agreement with the Class AA Mobile BayBears of the Southern League. Parent would not be retained for the 2017 season.

== Miscellaneous ==
Parent was named MVP of the 1987–1988 Dominican Winter League while playing for the Estrellas Orientales.

Parent’s son Nick was drafted by the Chicago White Sox in the 36th round of the 2013 MLB June Amateur Draft from California State University Monterey Bay.

On September 24, 2015, Nick was released by the Great Falls Voyagers, the Chicago White Sox’ Advanced Rookie affiliate in the Pioneer League.
