= Old California-Oregon Road =

Historical place in Shasta County, United States

Old California Oregon Road
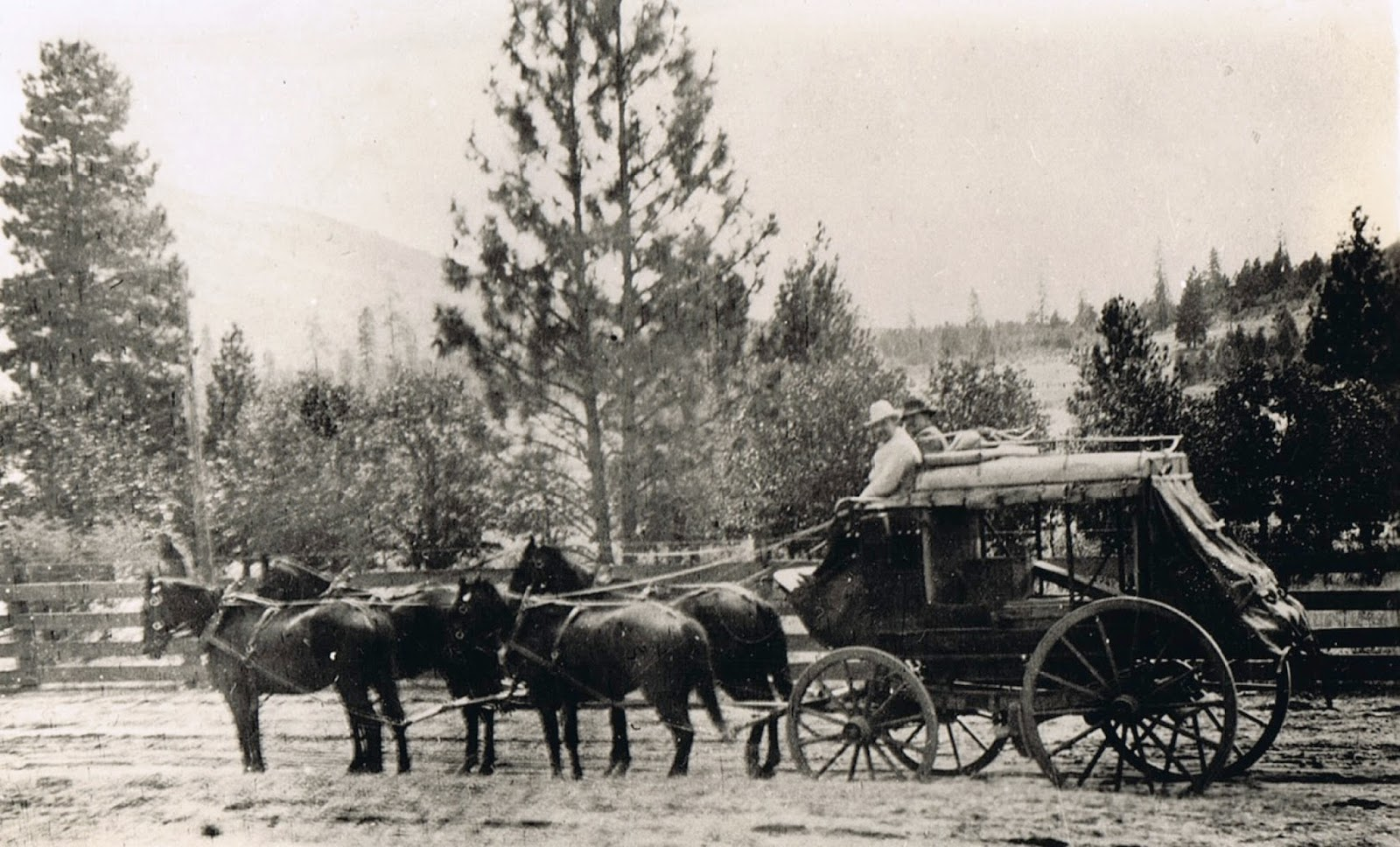
- California-Oregon Stagecoach Company on the Old California-Oregon Road

- Location within California Location within the United States
- 40.465°N 122.324°W
- Location: State Route 273, Anderson, California

California Historical Landmark
- Designated: December 6, 1932
- Reference no.: 58

Old California Oregon Road is a historical site in Anderson, California, in Shasta County. Old California Oregon Road site is California Historical Landmark No. 58 listed on December 6, 1932. The Old California Oregon Road was the main road used by pioneer travelers between the Trinity River and the northern gold mines of California and Oregon. The main part of the Old California Oregon Road ran from Portland to Sacramento.

== Bass Hill on the old road ==
On the road, stagecoaches had to go over Bass Hill in Redding, California in Shasta County. The Bass Hill site is California Historical Landmark No. 148. On the top of Bass Hill, the California and Oregon Stagecoach crossed the Pacific Highway and then dropped to the Pit River. The road, Old California Oregon Road, on Bass Hill was popular bandit holdup spot. A historical Marker is on Bass Hill to Willianson Lyncoya Smith, division stage agent of the California and Oregon Stage Company and other drivers. Smith was pioneer stagecoach driver on the Bass Hill road. The Oregon Stage Line owned the California-Oregon Stagecoach Company for some years. The California and Oregon Coast Overland Mail, operated the California-Oregon Stagecoach Company Line. The California-Oregon Stagecoach Company had daily stage service with both mail and passengers. The California-Oregon Stagecoach Company also operated in the winter months with sleighs over Scott Mountains. California-Oregon Stagecoach Company had a line from Portland and Sacramento by 1860. In 1870, the California-Oregon Stagecoach Company changed its route, the new line ran from Shasta-Yreka Road through French Gulch to the Sacramento River Canyon route and bypassed Shasta. The California-Oregon Stagecoach Company ran operated until rail service replaced its routes in 1887.

The Old California Oregon Road historical marker at the corner of California State Route 273 and Spring Gulch Road. The marker was placed there by Native Sons of the Golden West, McCloud Parlor No. 149 in 1931.

== See also ==
- California Historical Landmarks in Shasta County
