= Dersch Homestead =

Historical place in Shasta County, United States

- Dersch Homestead

- Location within California Location within the United States
- 40.486°N 122.151°W
- Location: Anderson, California

History
- Built: 1861

Site notes
- Architect: George Dersch

California Historical Landmark
- Designated: March 31, 1933
- Reference no.: 120

Dersch Homestead is a historical site in Anderson, California in Shasta County. Dersch Homestead site is a California Historical Landmark No. 120 listed on March 31, 1933.

On the Lassen and Nobles Trail in 1850 Doc Baker founded a resting stop for California Gold Rush travelers. George and Anna Maria (Kemmelmier) Dersch built a homestead here in 1861. The land around Anderson had always had conflict with the native tribes. On January 31, 1863, the natives attacked the homestead, no one was home. All the valuables were taken: cattle, horses, food, and clothing. In a raid in 1866 Anna Maria Dersch was killed in the raid. The raid was caused by renters of some of the Dersches' farm land had whipped three natives that were working in potato farm. After the attack the town summoned a posse and most of those in the raid were found and killed near their Dye Creek Camp.

The marker at the site of the Dersch Homestead was placed there by the California Department of Parks and Recreation, Shasta Historical Society, the Hollis Moss Historical Fund and Trinitarianus Chapter #62 E Clampus Vitus, Trinitarianus Chapter 62 on May 15, 1999.

== See also ==
- California Historical Landmarks in Shasta County
