= Mike Humiston =

American football player (born 1959)

No. 50, 57
- Position: Linebacker

Personal information
- Born: January 8, 1959 (age 67); Oceanside, California, U.S.
- Listed height: 6 ft 3 in (1.91 m)
- Listed weight: 238 lb (108 kg)

Career information
- High school: Anderson Union (Anderson, California)
- College: Weber State
- NFL draft: 1981: undrafted

Career history
- Buffalo Bills (1981); Baltimore Colts (1982); Indianapolis Colts (1984); San Diego Chargers (1987)

Career NFL statistics
- Fumble recoveries: 4
- Safeties: 1
- Stats at Pro Football Reference

Michael David Humiston (born January 8, 1959) is an American former professional football player who was a linebacker in the National Football League (NFL). He played college football for the Weber State Wildcats.

Graduating from Union High School in Anderson, California, he played collegiately at Shasta College and Weber State College. At Weber State, he was a three-year letterman and named First-Team All-America for the 1980 season. He played for the Buffalo Bills in 1981, the Baltimore Colts in 1982, the Indianapolis Colts in 1984, and for the San Diego Chargers in 1987.

Humiston received a degree in police science at Weber State and was a Chico, California, policeman in the offseason while playing in the NFL. After playing professional football, he was a member of the Tehama County, California, sheriff's department for six years, where he served as a patrol officer and then a detective. He later was the head coach for the Waynesburg University baseball program in Pennsylvania. He is currently the Director of the Department of Public Safety at Waynesburg University.
