= Fall River Valley School =

Historical place in Shasta County, United States

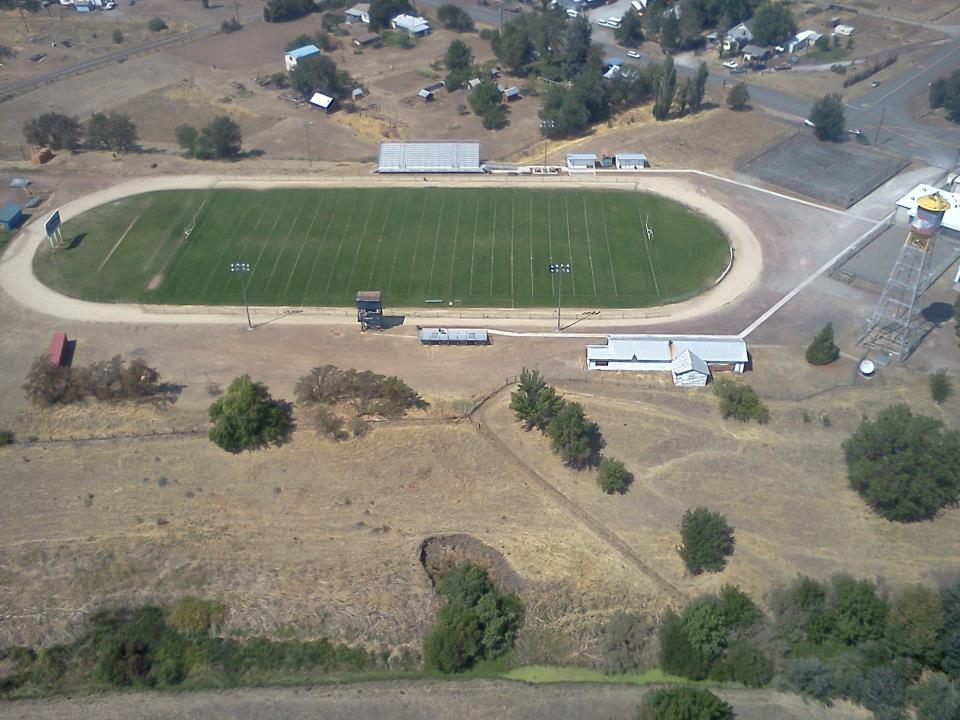
- Fall River High School, Fall River newest school, west of 1868 school

- Location within California Location within the United States
- 41.070891°N 121.3374°W
- Location: CA 299 east of McArthur, California

History
- Built: 1868
- Built for: Fall River Valley School District

Site notes
- Architect: Dana's sawmill
- Architectural style: log cabin one-room school

California Historical Landmark
- Designated: February 15, 1961
- Reference no.: 759

Fall River Valley School was built in 1868 and was the first school in Fall River Valley. The site of the former School is on California State Route 299 east of McArthur, California. The Fall River Valley School site is a California Historical Landmark No. 759 listed on February 15, 1961.

Fall River Valley School was log cabin one-room school that was 20 feet by 30 feet. The lumber for the school came from Dana's sawmill in the all River Valley. Dana's sawmill was the first sawmill in Fall River Valley. Dana's sawmill also supplied the lumber of the student's school desks.

A historical marker is at the site of the former Fall River Valley School on California State Route 299 3.6 miles east of McArthur. The marker was placed there by The California Park Commission working with The Fall River Teachers' Association and the Fort Crook Historical Society on May 30, 1961.

== See also ==
- California Historical Landmarks in Shasta County
