= Jarrett Kingston =

American football player (born 1999)

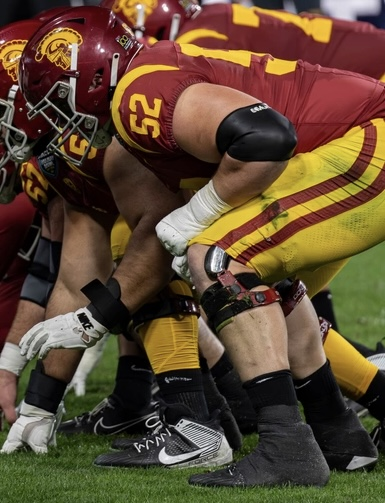
- Kingston in 2023

No. 62 – Miami Dolphins
- Position: Guard
- Roster status: Active

Personal information
- Born: December 2, 1999 (age 26); Redding, California, U.S.
- Listed height: 6 ft 4 in (1.93 m)
- Listed weight: 308 lb (140 kg)

Career information
- High school: Anderson (Anderson, California)
- College: Washington State (2018–2022); USC (2023)
- NFL draft: 2024: 6th round, 215th overall pick

Career history
- San Francisco 49ers (2024)*; Carolina Panthers (2024–2025); Houston Texans (2025); Miami Dolphins (2026–present)
- * Offseason or practice squad member only

Career NFL statistics as of 2025
- Games played: 9
- Stats at Pro Football Reference

Jarrett Kingston (born December 2, 1999) is an American professional football guard for the Miami Dolphins of the National Football League (NFL). He played college football for the Washington State Cougars and USC Trojans and was selected by the San Francisco 49ers in the sixth round of the 2024 NFL draft.

== Early life ==
Kingston was born in and grew up in Northern California. He attended Anderson Union High School where he was a standout two-way lineman in football and also won a discus throw championship. He was called up from the junior varsity football team at age 15 and then helped the team reach the NSCIF Division III playoffs as a junior while being named first-team All-CIF Northern Section. He then earned All-NorCal honors as a senior. He committed to play college football for the Washington State Cougars as a three-star prospect.

== College career ==
Kingston redshirted as a true freshman at Washington State in 2018, appearing in one game. He appeared in 10 games as a left guard during the 2019 season and then started all four games in the COVID-19-shortened 2020 season at the position. He started all 13 games in 2021, playing at left guard for the first 12 games before switching to left tackle in the final game of the year. Kingston started nine games in the 2022 season before missing the rest of the year due to injury; nonetheless he was chosen an honorable mention All-Pac-12 Conference selection.

Although Kingston had considered entering the 2023 NFL draft prior to his injury, he opted to return for a final season in 2023 and transferred to the USC Trojans. He started 11-of-12 games for the Trojans while seeing action at both right tackle and right guard, allowing a total of four sacks.

== Professional career ==
Pre-draft measurables
Height	Weight	Arm length	Hand span	Wingspan	40-yard dash	10-yard split	20-yard split	20-yard shuttle	Three-cone drill	Vertical jump	Broad jump	Bench press
6 ft 4 1/4 in (1.94 m)	306 lb (139 kg)	32 1/8 in (0.82 m)	9 3/4 in (0.25 m)	6 ft 6 1/8 in (1.98 m)	5.02 s	1.73 s	2.91 s	4.47 s	7.53 s	31.5 in (0.80 m)	9 ft 3 in (2.82 m)	36 reps
All values from NFL Combine/Pro Day

=== San Francisco 49ers ===
Kingston was selected by the San Francisco 49ers in the sixth round (215th overall) of the 2024 NFL draft. He was waived by San Francisco on August 27, 2024.

=== Carolina Panthers ===
On August 28, 2024, Kingston was claimed off waivers by the Carolina Panthers. He made seven appearances for Carolina during the regular season.

Kingston was waived on August 26, 2025 and re-signed to the practice squad.

=== Houston Texans ===
On September 30, 2025, Kingston was signed by the Houston Texans off of the Panthers' practice squad.

On February 21, 2026, Kingston re-signed with the Texans. He was waived by the Texans on August 30 as a part of final roster cuts.

=== Miami Dolphins ===
On August 31, 2026, Kingston was claimed off of waivers by the Miami Dolphins.
