= Reading Adobe =

Historical place in Shasta County, United States

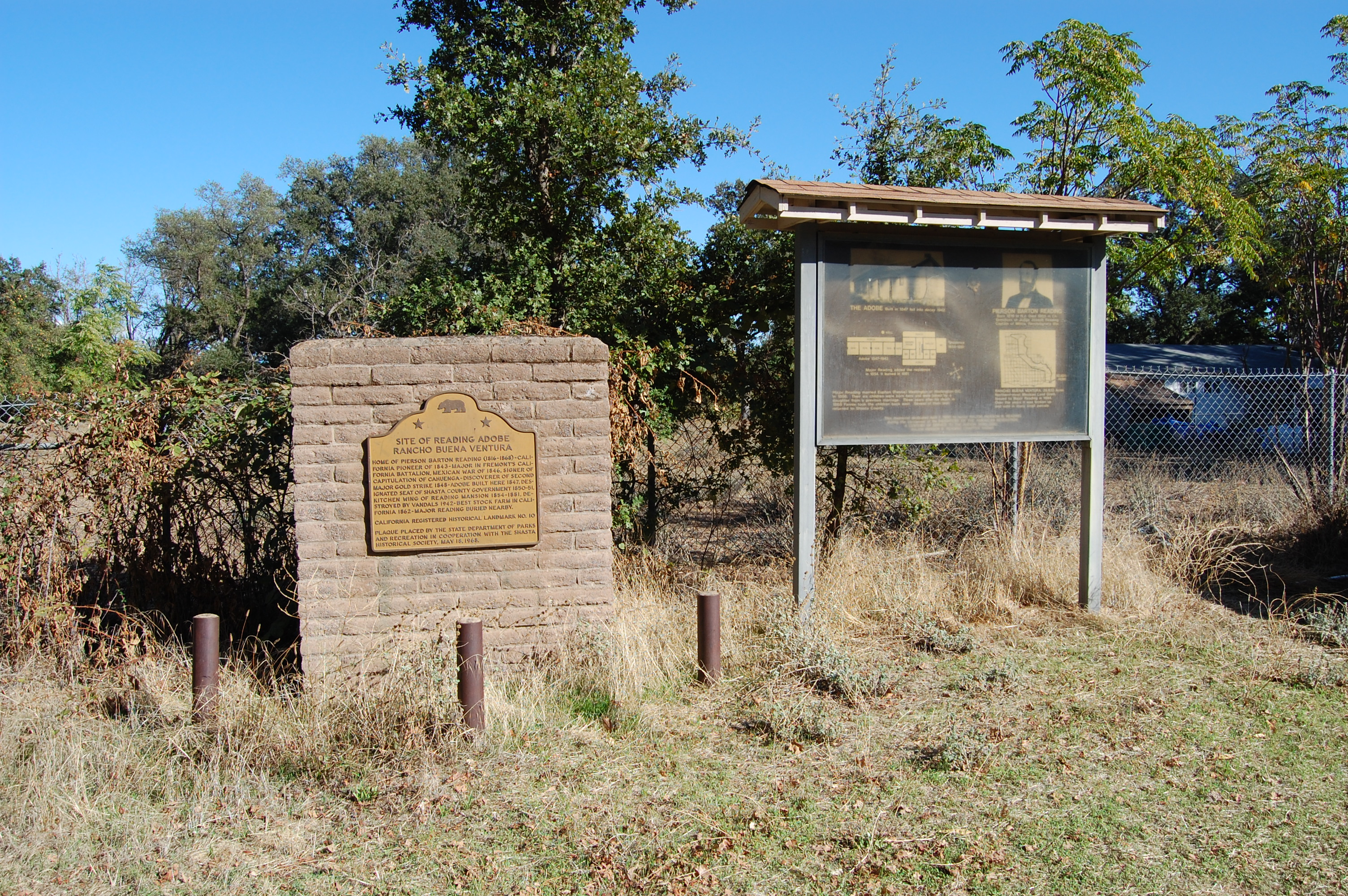
- Reading Adobe site info

- Location within California Location within the United States
- 40.3913°N 122.2003°W
- Location: Cottonwood, California

History
- Built: 1843
- Built for: Pierson Barton Reading

Site notes
- Architectural style: Adobe bricks

California Historical Landmark
- Designated: June 1, 1932
- Reference no.: 10

U.S. National Register of Historic Places
- Designated: July 14, 1971
- Reference no.: 71000194

Reading Adobe is a historical site in Cottonwood, California in Shasta County. Pioneer Baby's Grave is a California Historical Landmark No. 10 listed on June 1, 1932. Reading Adobe is listed on the National Register of Historic Places listings in Shasta County, California, listed July 14, 1971 as #71000194.

Reading Adobe was the house of California pioneer Pierson Barton Reading (1816-1868). Reading built his first house in 1843. Reading was member of John C. Frémont's California Battalion. Major Reading and the California Battalion fought in the Mexican-American War. Reading was one of the signer of the Treaty of Cahuenga on January 13, 1847, which ended the war in Alta California. Reading found gold in 1848 at Clear Creek called Reading's Bar in Redding, California. Reading came to California in a wagon train in 1843. In 1844 he was given a Mexican grant Rancho Buena Ventura. There are no remains of the house.

The historical marker is at entrance to Reading Island Park, 213 Adobe Road in Cottonwood. The marker was placed there by the California State Department of Public Works - Division of Highways. A second marker is on Main Street just north of the Bowman Road and Interstate 5 at 40.371°N 122.283°W

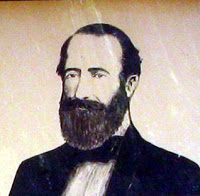
Pierson Barton Reading

== See also ==
- California Historical Landmarks in Shasta County
