= Foundation of Catholic Basilica =

Historical place in Shasta County, United States

Catholic Basilica Foundation
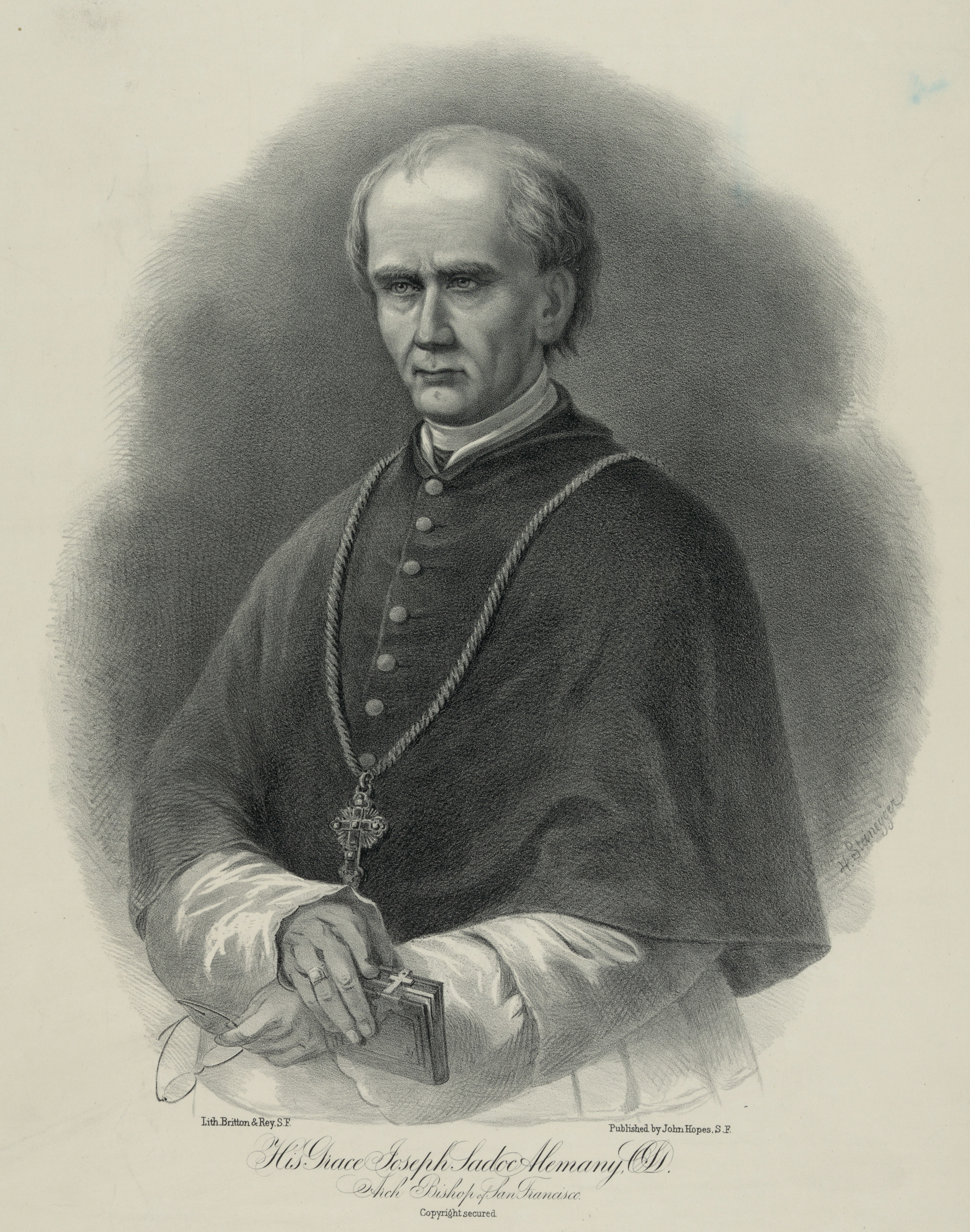
- Archbishop Joseph Sadoc Alemany laid the Catholic Basilica Foundation

- Location within California Location within the United States
- 40.593°N 122.488°W
- Location: Red Bluff Road and Crocker Alley; Shasta, California

History
- Built: 1857
- Built for: Catholic Church

Site notes
- Architectural style: Stone foundation

California Historical Landmark
- Designated: April 10, 1951
- Reference no.: 483

Catholic Basilica foundation is a historical site in Shasta, California in Shasta County. Catholic Basilica site is a California Historical Landmark No. 483 listed on April 10, 1951. The cornerstone of Catholic Basilica was place in May 1857 by Archbishop Joseph Sadoc Alemany O.P. and the Reverend Raphael Rinaldi. The church had its beginning in 1853, when the Archbishop of San Francisco, Alemany, sent Father Florian Schwenninger to be the head of mission in Shasta County serving the miners and settlers. The first church was small wooden church built in 1853. In 1855 Father Schwenninger was transferred to Weaverville and Father Raphael Rinaldi took of duties at Shasta. Father Rinaldi started to build the new stone church in 1857, to replace the wooden church. The building did not get beyond the laying of the Foundation, that is still on the site.

The marker at the site of the Catholic Basilica Foundation.

== See also ==
- California Historical Landmarks in Shasta County
