= Whiskeytown, California =

Unincorporated community in California, United States

Whiskeytown
- Ghost town
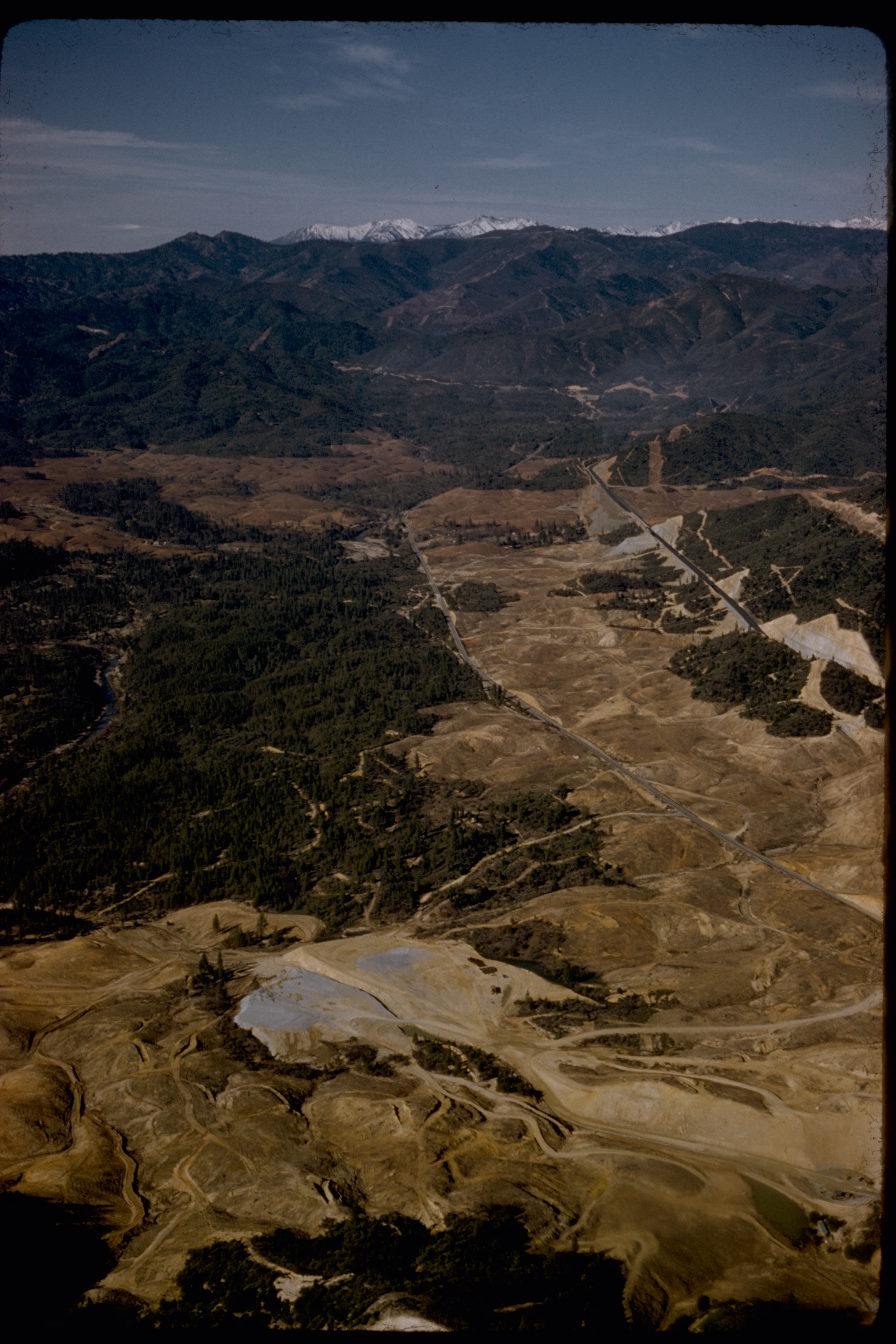
- Aerial view of the Whiskeytown National Recreation Area
- Interactive map of Whiskeytown
- Coordinates: 40°38′05″N 122°33′40″W
- Country: United States
- State: California
- County: Shasta

Population
  - Total: 0

California Historical Landmark
- Reference no.: 131

Whiskeytown was an unincorporated community in Shasta County, California, United States. Although once a bustling mining town, it was flooded to make way for Whiskeytown Lake in 1962, now part of Whiskeytown–Shasta–Trinity National Recreation Area. All that remains is the relocated store, a few residences (mostly occupied by National Recreation Area personnel), and old mines that are above the water level of the lake. Whiskeytown is registered as a California Historical Landmark.

== History ==
Whiskeytown was one of Shasta County's first gold mining settlements during the California Gold Rush of 1849, though at the time it was called Whiskey Creek Diggings. There are two stories for how the settlement might have gotten its name: The first states that a barrel of whiskey fell from a pack mule and into the creek that ran by Whiskeytown; the second attributes the name to the legend that miners at Whiskeytown could drink a barrel of the hard liquor a day.

The area became known as a source for gold. Nearby Redding, CA's newspaper The Record Searchlight reports miners averaged $50 in gold per day ($2,039.41 in 2024 dollars), and in 1851 a 56-ounce gold nugget was found. The first woman arrived in town in 1852, and by 1855 about 1,000 gold miners lived in Whiskeytown. The post office was opened in 1856, but the federal government didn't allow the Whiskeytown name to be attached to it because it was considered inappropriate. Finally, in 1952, the federal government agreed to name the post office after the town.

Construction of the Whiskeytown Dam began in 1960, and the basin began to fill with water in 1962. Some Whiskeytown buildings were moved to higher ground, but others remain underwater. The dam was dedicated by President John F. Kennedy in 1963.

== Climate ==
According to the Köppen Climate Classification system, Whiskeytown has a hot-summer mediterranean climate, abbreviated "Csa" on climate maps. The hottest temperature recorded in Whiskeytown was 120 °F (48.9 °C) on September 6, 1988, while the coldest temperature recorded was 11 °F (−11.7 °C) on December 21–22, 1990.

Climate data for Whiskeytown Reservoir, California, 1991–2020 normals, extremes 1960–present
Month	Jan	Feb	Mar	Apr	May	Jun	Jul	Aug	Sep	Oct	Nov	Dec	Year
Record high °F (°C)	79 (26)	82 (28)	92 (33)	97 (36)	104 (40)	113 (45)	119 (48)	115 (46)	120 (49)	104 (40)	93 (34)	81 (27)	120 (49)
Mean maximum °F (°C)	67.1 (19.5)	71.3 (21.8)	79.7 (26.5)	86.9 (30.5)	94.7 (34.8)	102.7 (39.3)	108.1 (42.3)	107.8 (42.1)	103.5 (39.7)	93.8 (34.3)	76.5 (24.7)	65.6 (18.7)	110.0 (43.3)
Mean daily maximum °F (°C)	54.4 (12.4)	58.2 (14.6)	63.4 (17.4)	70.2 (21.2)	79.4 (26.3)	88.8 (31.6)	98.5 (36.9)	97.8 (36.6)	91.9 (33.3)	77.6 (25.3)	61.8 (16.6)	53.5 (11.9)	74.6 (23.7)
Daily mean °F (°C)	46.7 (8.2)	49.5 (9.7)	53.3 (11.8)	58.5 (14.7)	67.1 (19.5)	75.3 (24.1)	82.6 (28.1)	81.3 (27.4)	76.3 (24.6)	65.0 (18.3)	52.8 (11.6)	46.0 (7.8)	62.9 (17.2)
Mean daily minimum °F (°C)	39.0 (3.9)	40.8 (4.9)	43.2 (6.2)	46.8 (8.2)	54.8 (12.7)	61.7 (16.5)	66.7 (19.3)	64.9 (18.3)	60.8 (16.0)	52.4 (11.3)	43.8 (6.6)	38.6 (3.7)	51.1 (10.6)
Mean minimum °F (°C)	29.4 (−1.4)	29.9 (−1.2)	32.9 (0.5)	35.5 (1.9)	41.8 (5.4)	48.6 (9.2)	56.7 (13.7)	55.5 (13.1)	49.8 (9.9)	40.6 (4.8)	33.0 (0.6)	29.1 (−1.6)	26.6 (−3.0)
Record low °F (°C)	17 (−8)	18 (−8)	26 (−3)	28 (−2)	32 (0)	39 (4)	47 (8)	47 (8)	41 (5)	28 (−2)	25 (−4)	11 (−12)	11 (−12)
Average precipitation inches (mm)	10.74 (273)	11.58 (294)	9.90 (251)	4.97 (126)	3.10 (79)	1.33 (34)	0.15 (3.8)	0.10 (2.5)	0.46 (12)	2.81 (71)	6.31 (160)	11.47 (291)	62.92 (1,597.3)
Average snowfall inches (cm)	2.4 (6.1)	0.0 (0.0)	0.0 (0.0)	0.0 (0.0)	0.0 (0.0)	0.0 (0.0)	0.0 (0.0)	0.0 (0.0)	0.0 (0.0)	0.0 (0.0)	0.0 (0.0)	0.1 (0.25)	2.5 (6.35)
Average precipitation days (≥ 0.01 in)	14.4	11.6	12.8	9.5	7.3	3.4	0.6	0.9	2.0	4.9	10.1	13.9	91.4
Average snowy days (≥ 0.1 in)	0.6	0.0	0.0	0.0	0.0	0.0	0.0	0.0	0.0	0.0	0.0	0.0	0.6
Source 1: NOAA (snow/snow days 1981–2010)
Source 2: National Weather Service

== Present day ==
Today, what was once a bustling mining town is a popular lake and recreation area. Whiskeytown Lake, part of the Central Valley Project, draws people looking to swim, sail, kayak, or fish, among other activities. On clear days, the outlines of buildings that were once Whiskeytown can be seen at the bottom of the lake, according to The Record Searchlight.

Whiskeytown Cemetery was moved during the construction of the dam. All the graves were exhumed and transported to higher ground. Today, Whiskeytown Cemetery is maintained by locals, and is somewhat of a hidden tourist destination as well, due to its unusual and festive decor. Graves are decorated with flowers as well as trinkets such as toys or the deceased's favorite snacks or cocktails.

== See also ==
- French Gulch Historic District
- California Historical Landmarks in Shasta County
- Reading's Bar
