= 1852 United States Senate special election in California =

- January 30, 1852

Majority vote of both houses needed to win
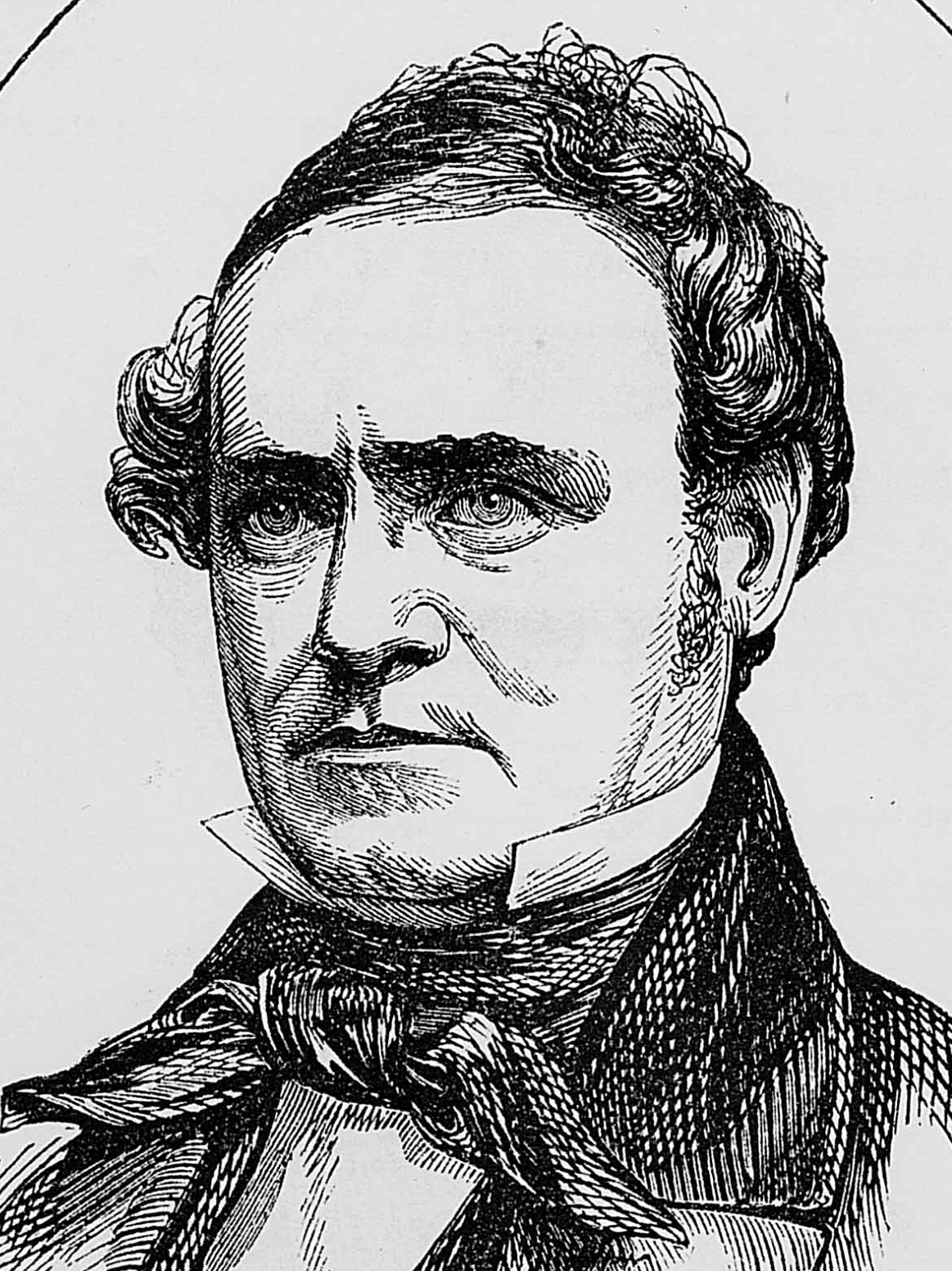

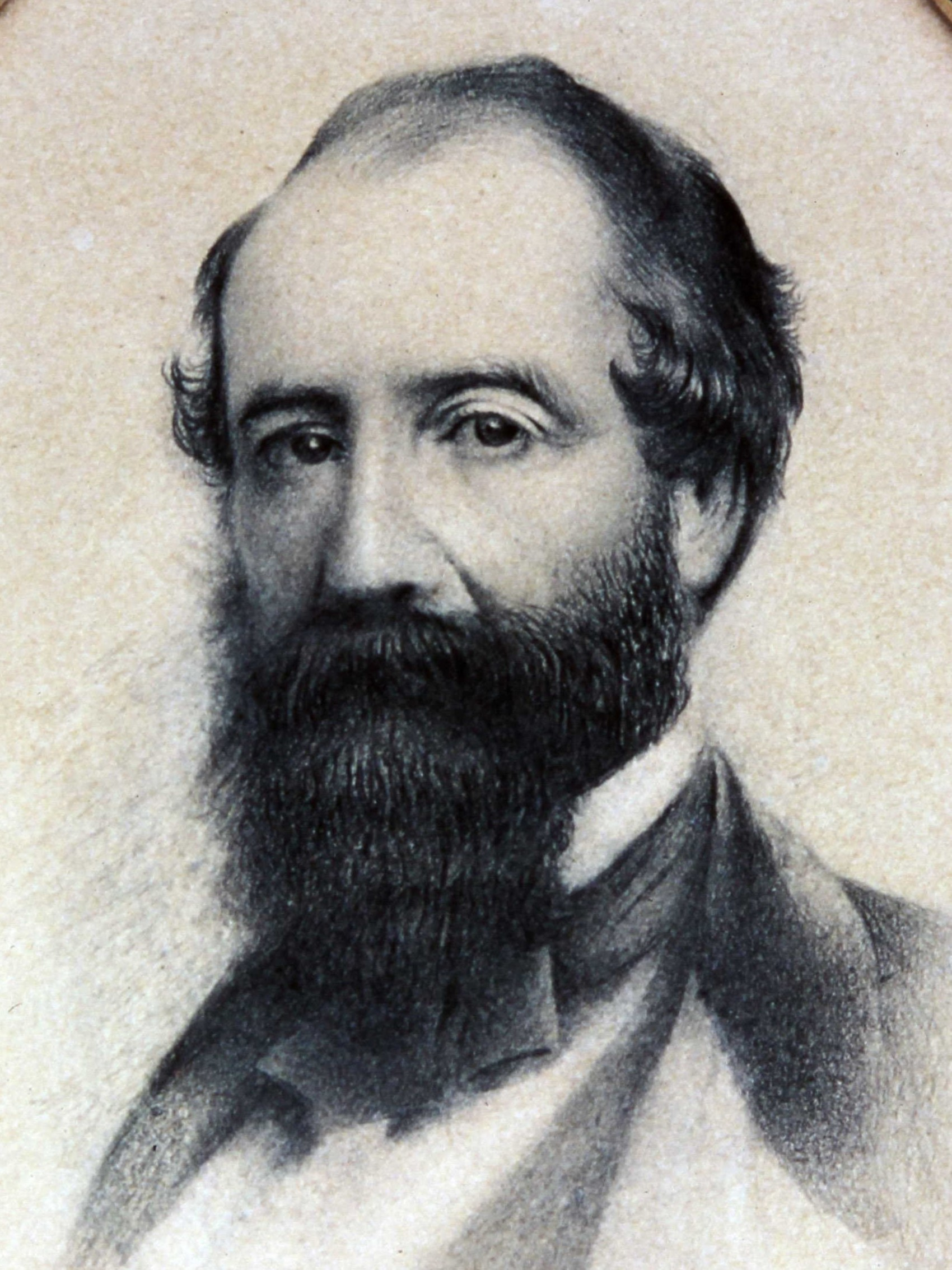
Nominee	John B. Weller	Pierson B. Reading
Party	Democratic	Whig
Joint session	71	17
Percentage	80.68%	19.32%
Senator before election
None
(Legislature failed to elect)
Elected Senator
John B. Weller
Democratic

The 1852 United States Senate special election in California was held on January 30, 1852, by the California State Legislature to elect a U.S. senator (Class 1) to represent the State of California in the United States Senate. Legislators had previously attempted to elect a Senator in 1851, but could not reach a majority for a single candidate. In a special joint session, former Democratic Congressman from Ohio John B. Weller was elected over previous Whig candidate for Governor Pierson B. Reading.

== Results ==
Election in the Legislature (joint session)
Party	Candidate	Votes	%
Democratic	John B. Weller	71	80.68%
Whig	Pierson B. Reading	17	19.32%
Total votes		88	100.00%
