= 1851 California gubernatorial election =

- September 3, 1851
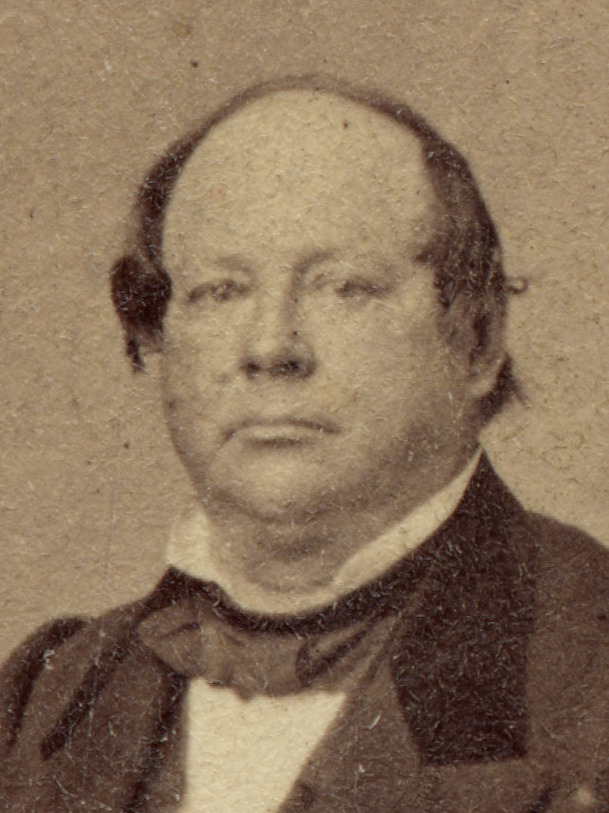

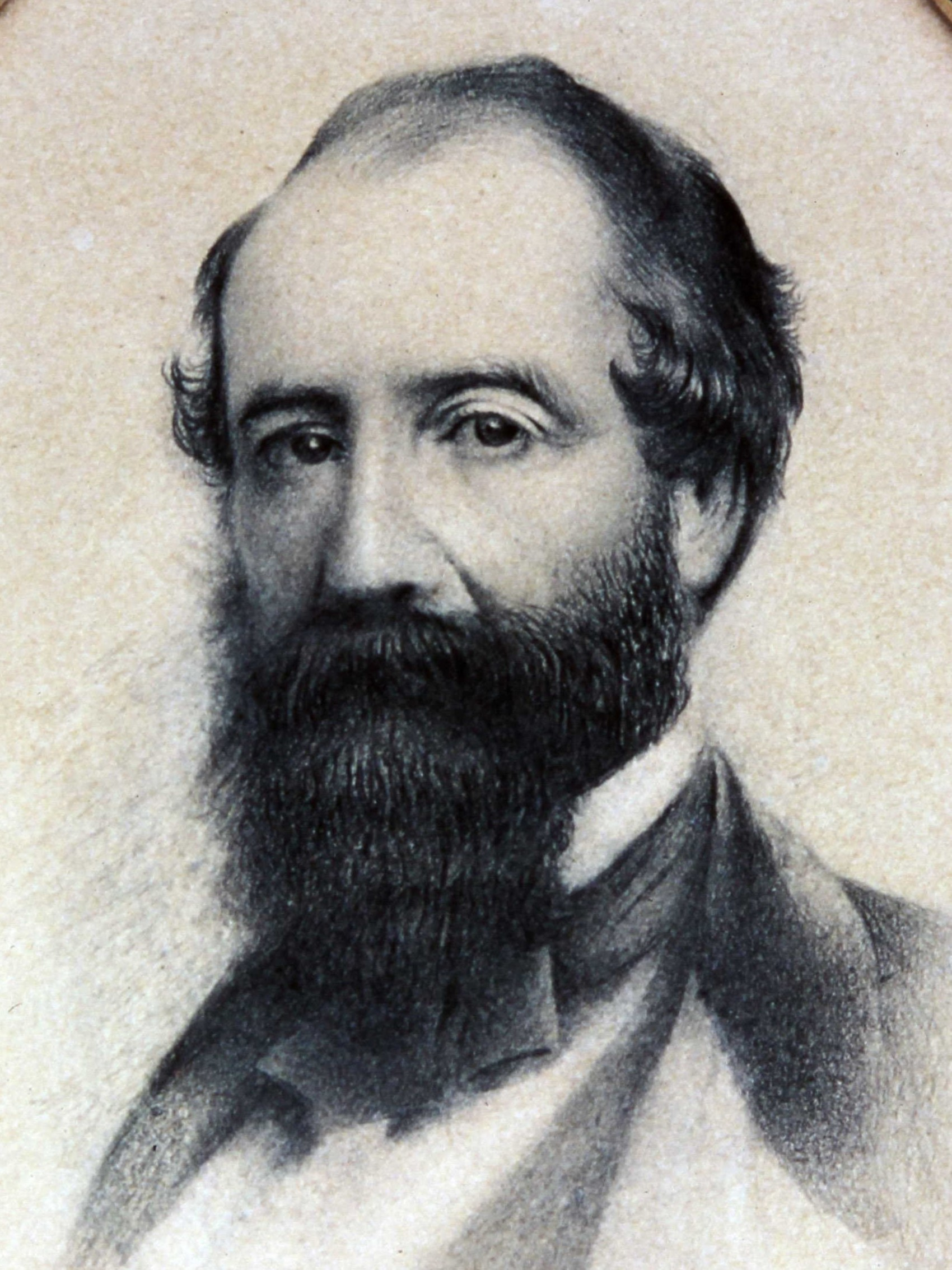
Nominee	John Bigler	Pierson B. Reading
Party	Democratic	Whig
Popular vote	23,175	22,735
Percentage	50.48%	49.52%
- County results Bigler: 50–60% 60–70% Reading: 50–60% 60–70% 80–90% >90% Tie: 50% No Results
Governor before election
John McDougal
Democratic
Elected Governor
John Bigler
Democratic

The 1851 California gubernatorial election was held on September 3, 1851, to elect the governor of California.

During the 1851 convention, the Democratic Party refused to renominate incumbent John McDougal as the party's choice for governor. Instead, state Democrats nominated Assembly Speaker John Bigler.

== Results ==
California gubernatorial election, 1851
Party	Candidate	Votes	%
Democratic	John Bigler	23,175	50.48%
Whig	Pierson B. Reading	22,735	49.52%
Majority		440	0.96%
Total votes		45,910	100.00%
Democratic hold			

=== Results by county ===
County	John Bigler Democratic		Pierson B. Reading Whig		Margin		Total votes cast
County	#	%	#	%	#	%	Total votes cast
Butte	1,410	53.84%	1,209	46.16%	201	7.67%	2,619
Calaveras	1,780	62.28%	1,078	37.72%	702	24.56%	2,858
Colusa	77	48.73%	81	51.27%	-4	-2.53%	158
Contra Costa	174	49.01%	181	50.99%	-7	-1.97%	355
El Dorado	3,072	53.88%	2,630	46.12%	442	7.75%	5,702
Klamath	170	33.53%	337	66.47%	-167	-32.94%	507
Los Angeles	72	14.52%	424	85.48%	-352	-70.97%	496
Marin	12	7.59%	146	92.41%	-134	-84.81%	158
Mariposa	779	55.92%	614	44.08%	165	11.84%	1,393
Monterey	195	60.56%	127	39.44%	68	21.12%	322
Napa	82	36.77%	141	63.23%	-59	-26.46%	223
Nevada	1,466	50.81%	1,419	49.19%	47	1.63%	2,885
Placer	1,196	59.03%	830	40.97%	366	18.07%	2,026
Sacramento	2,269	55.14%	1,846	44.86%	423	10.28%	5,774
San Diego	104	63.41%	60	36.59%	44	26.83%	164
San Francisco	2,431	42.10%	3,343	57.90%	-912	-15.79%	5,774
San Joaquin	801	50.00%	801	50.00%	0	0.00%	1,602
San Luis Obispo	8	12.12%	58	87.88%	-50	-75.76%	66
Santa Barbara	0	0.00%	205	100.00%	-205	-100.00%	205
Santa Clara	377	31.00%	869	69.00%	-462	-37.99%	1,216
Santa Cruz	35	14.11%	213	85.89%	-178	-71.77%	248
Shasta	1,169	54.52%	975	45.48%	194	9.05%	2,144
Solano	233	37.22%	393	62.78%	-160	-25.56%	626
Sonoma	193	47.89%	210	52.11%	-17	-4.22%	403
Sutter	139	52.85%	124	47.15%	15	5.70%	263
Trinity	552	50.32%	545	49.68%	7	0.64%	1,097
Tuolumne	1,580	52.51%	1,429	47.49%	151	5.02%	3,009
Yolo	292	61.60%	182	38.40%	110	23.21%	474
Yuba	2,507	52.21%	2,295	47.79%	212	4.41%	4,802
Total	23,175	50.48%	22,735	49.52%	440	0.96%	45,910
