= Anderson Union High School =

Location
- 1471 Ferry St; Anderson, California 96007; United States
- 40.4443°N 122.3050°W

Information
- School type: Secondary
- Principal: Tom Safford
- Staff: 24.91 (on an FTE basis)
- Enrollment: 562 (2024–2025)
- Student to teacher ratio: 22.56
- Colors: Blue and Gold
- Mascot: Cub
- Website: https://www.auhsd.net/andersonunionhighschool_home.aspx

Anderson Union High School is a high school in Anderson, California.

== Notable alumni ==
- Rick Bosetti, former Major League Baseball outfielder for four different teams.
- Mike Humiston, former head baseball coach for Waynesburg University, played in the NFL for Baltimore Colts, Buffalo Bills and the San Diego Chargers.
- Jarrett Kingston, NFL guard for the San Francisco 49ers.
- Mark Parent, former Major League Baseball catcher for a number of teams from 1986 through 1998.
- Bill Plummer, former Major League Baseball catcher for Cincinnati Reds and Seattle Mariners.
- Jacob Slichter, drummer for the Minneapolis based rock band, Semisonic.
