= Southern Hotel & Stage Station =

Historical place in Shasta County, United States

Southern Hotel & Stage Station Sims, California (Former, Hazel Creek, California)
- Southern Hotel & Stage Station in 1881

- Location within California Location within the United States
- 41.0665°N 122.362°W
- Location: 19010 Mears Ridge Road, Castella, California

History
- Built: 1859
- Built for: Stagecoach Stop

Site notes
- Architect: Simeon Fisher Southern
- Architectural style: log cabin

California Historical Landmark
- Designated: August 1, 1932
- Reference no.: 33

Southern's Stage Station was built in 1859 by Simeon Fisher Southern. The Southern's Stage Station site is on 9010 Mears Ridge Road, south of Castella, California in Shasta County. The Southern's Stage Station is a California Historical Landmark No. 33 listed on August 1, 1932. Simeon Fisher Southern and his Sarah Southern operated the Stagecoach Station wife Southern's Stage Station and Southern Hotel were log cabin building built in 1859. Travelers on the stagecoach or riding through could stop for rest and food for the 50 years this station operated till 1909. The town was called Hazel Creek, California, but change to Sims, California in 1871 as Southern's Stage Station and store was the center of the town.

== History ==
Simeon Fisher Southern, nickname was Sims, was born in Stephensburg, Kentucky, on a farm, on September 6, 1822. He departed Kentucky and worked west, stopping and working in Louisiana, New Mexico, Arizona and Utah. He arrived in Shasta County California in 1854. He met Charles F. Louis who owned the Eagle hotel Queen City in North, Shasta and partner with him and ran his hotel. Sims married Sarah Emma Lafferty, also from Kentucky on February 26, 1856, they had 10 children. Sims next partnered with his friend E.K. Shed, Esq., they purchased the St. Charles hotel on Main Street at the City of Shasta. He also leased the Empire hotel in French Gulch with S.F. Black. In 1858 the Simeon and Sarah Southern moved to Dog Creek in the Sacramento River Canyon and ended his Empire hotel lease. In Dog Creek Sims opened a small inn with J.S. Cameron on the Sacramento River Road. Sims ran for Justice of the peace and won in the Sugar Loaf Township, the towns of Dog Creek and Hazel Creek. Simeon and Sarah Southern moved Hazel Creek and opened the Southern's Stage Station and hotel in 1859. The Station did well and Simeon and Sarah Southern built it into a large two-story wooden building. Guest could put up their horses at Sweetbrier stables, till he built his own corral. Southern's trading post did well also. Hazel Creek started in 1855 as a gold mining town part of the California Gold Rush. Claims were still being worked in 1859 with the help of free water from Hazel Creek. Hazel Creek flows into the Sacramento River near the town. Southern's Stage Station was main part of the Greathouse Company of Shasta stage route by 1871, and the hotel's name changed at this time. George L. Greathouse was the a brother-in-law of Sarah. In September 1880, Rutherford B. Hayes and the First Lady, Lucy Webb Hayes, General William Tecumseh Sherman, and General Phillip Sheridan stayed at the Station visiting Redding. In 1902, Southern's hotel and Stage Station was sold to timber company, Knight & Shelbey, by Sarah. Knight & Shelbey built the first sawmill in the Hazel Creek. In 1903 Knight & Shelbey sold the sawmill to the Sims Lumber Company. , Sims Lumber Company in 1913 sold to George Ralph & Sons, who built a logging railroad. In 1919 George Ralph & Sons sold to the Shasta Mill & Lumber Company. In 1910 the California Highway Commission opened the Sim campground for its workers in the valley. From 1933 to 1939 the Civilian Conservation Corps, Company 978, operated Camp Sims, as it did work in the valley. Civilian Conservation Corps Company 978 built: Sims lookout, Bradle lookout, Everett Memorial Highway in they valley and fire protection projects.

== Historical marker ==
A historical marker is at the site of the former Southern's Stage Station at 19010 Mears Ridge Road, Castella, California. The original marker was placed there by the "Pioneers of the Gold Trail" 1849–1855. The current marker was placed by there by the daughters of the Pioneers of the Gold Trail: May H. and Fannie E. Southern on May 30, 1931.

== Legacy ==
- Near the old station is United States Forest Service Sims Flat Campground .
- Near the old station is Union Pacific stop at Sims California.
- Between the Interstate 5 and Hazel Creek is Sims Lookout Road.
- At the top of Sims Lookout Road is a hill top Sims Peak Lookout.
- Near the old station is the United States Forest Service's Sims Fire Station

== See also ==
- California Historical Landmarks in Shasta County
