= Bass Hill (California) =

Historical place in Shasta County, United States

Bass Hill Site of California-Oregon Stagecoach Company road
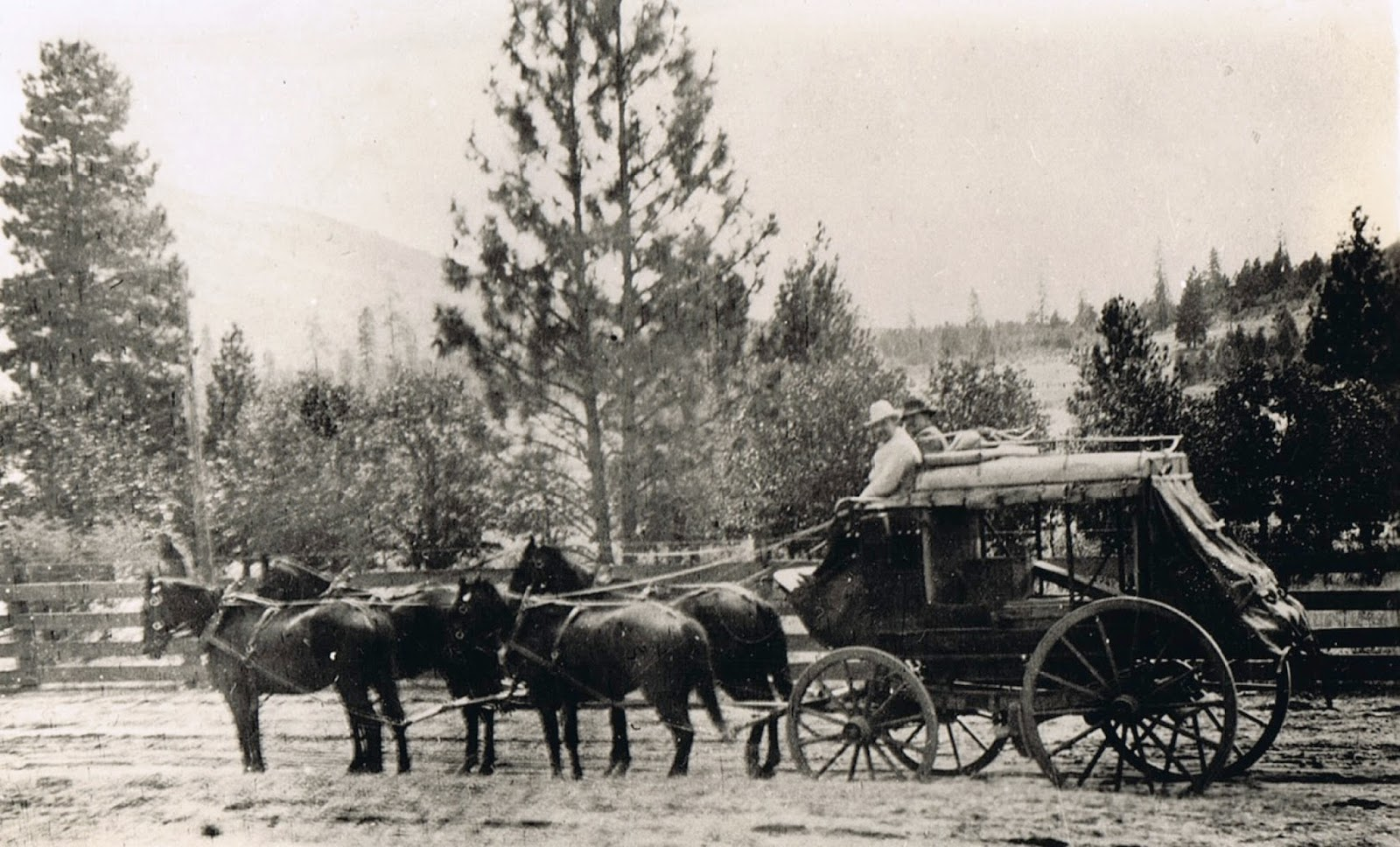
- California-Oregon Stagecoach Company

- Location within California Location within the United States
- 40.7544°N 122.3230°W
- Location: Bridge Bay Resort; 10300 Bridge Bay Rd, Redding, California

California Historical Landmark
- Designated: January 11, 1935
- Reference no.: 148

Bass Hill is a historical site in Redding, California in Shasta County. Bass Hill site is a California Historical Landmark No. 148 listed on January 11, 1935. On the top of Bass Hill the California and Oregon Stagecoach crossed the Pacific Highway and then dropped to the Pit River. The road, Old California-Oregon Road, on Bass Hill was popular bandit holdup spot. A historical Marker is on Bass Hill to Willianson Lyncoya Smith, division stage agent of the California and Oregon Stage Company and other drivers. Smith was pioneer stagecoach driver on the Bass Hill road.

The Oregon Stage Line owned the California-Oregon Stagecoach Company for some years. The California and Oregon Coast Overland Mail, operated the California-Oregon Stagecoach Company Line. The California-Oregon Stagecoach Company had daily stage service with both mail and passengers. The California-Oregon Stagecoach Company also operated in the winter months with sleighs over Scott Mountains. California-Oregon Stagecoach Company had a line from Portland and Sacramento by 1860. In 1870, the California-Oregon Stagecoach Company changed its route, the new line ran from Shasta-Yreka Road through French Gulch to the Sacramento River Canyon route and bypassed Shasta. The California-Oregon Stagecoach Company ran operated until rail service replaced its routes in 1887.

The marker on the Bridge Bay Road near the entrance to Bridge Bay Resort. Marker placed in 1920 by Mae Helene Bacon Bogge.
The marker is titled Pioneers Who Held the Ribbons.

The marker list riders and details about them:

- Willianson Lyncoya Smith, U.S. Mail Rider
- James E. Birch, first stage driver in California
- J.B. Crandall, first stage over the Sierra Nevada mountains on Nov. 24, 1872
- W.F. Hall & W.H. Hall
- Marshall McCummings, first stage from Sacramento to Shasta
- Daniel Masten Cawley, first stage over the Siskiyou mountains
- Andrew Jackson Bacon and Joseph Henry Bacon
- The maker continues with a list of names.

== See also ==
- California Historical Landmarks in Shasta County
- Bell's Bridge (California)
- Old California-Oregon Road
