= Delta Consolidated Mining Company =

The Delta Consolidated Mining Company was an American mining company that operated a gold mine in Shasta County, California. A 3 ft (914 mm) narrow gauge railroad connecting the mine to the nearby town of Delta, California, operated for several decades.

== History of the mine ==
The company owned and operated the Delta gold mine, in the Dog Creek mining district, about seven miles west of Delta, on Upper Dog Creek. A stamp mill was erected on Dog Creek, near the mine. The orebodies were narrow quartz veins in greenstone, containing free gold and sulfide minerals.

== History of the narrow gauge railroad ==
In 1902, a 3 ft (914 mm) gauge railroad was constructed from the Southern Pacific transfer at Delta Station to the stamp mill some 6.5 miles away. In the middle 1880s, Delta had been the terminus of the California and Oregon Railroad, later absorbed by the Central Pacific.

A switchback was used to ascend to the flat table land above Delta, and from there the line pursued a gradual grade west on the north side of Dog Creek, maintaining elevation until the creek rose to meet it about 2 miles from the mill site. From here on, the grade was right at creekside.

For many years a Climax locomotive, called "The Doctor", was used for power and the only other equipment seems to have been a single flatcar upon which sacked ore was shipped to Delta for transfer to Southern Pacific. They were then taken to the smelters at Kennet and Coram for further processing. Today both of these towns are under Shasta Lake.

Operations on the line were infrequent, and ceased altogether in the early 1920s. The property fell into the hands of Cash Elder, who had been a mining engineer, and arrangements were made to dispose of the railroad. The locomotive apparently went to South America along with some rail in about 1928. The rest of the railroad remained largely intact until 1941 when it was pulled up for scrap.

Today nearly the entire right of way can be traced winding alongside and just below the present Dog Creek Road.
