= Anderson New Technology High School =

Coordinates: 40.4522°N 122.30044°W

- Anderson, California; United States

Information
- School type: Charter high school
- School district: Anderson Union High School District.

Anderson New Technology High School, often referred to as "New Tech," is a public charter high school located in Anderson, California, and is part of the Anderson Union High School District. The school is known for its emphasis on a collaborative community, encouraging students to become effective communicators, critical thinkers, resilient learners, and engaged citizens.

The educational approach at New Tech is centered around problem and project-based learning, fostering teamwork, leadership, and critical thinking skills. This innovative approach is supported by the school's chartering by the Bill & Melinda Gates Foundation.

In terms of academic performance, Anderson New Technology High School exhibits a varied range of test results. For math proficiency, 21-39% of students have achieved proficiency, which is below the California state average of 34%. In reading, however, 60-79% of students have reached proficiency, surpassing the state average of 49%. This suggests a stronger performance in literacy-related subjects compared to mathematics.

The student body at Anderson New Technology High School is diverse, with a composition of 75% White, 16% Hispanic, 5% Two or more races, 2% American Indian, and 2% Asian students. The school maintains a high graduation rate of at least 80%. It is ranked among the top 50% of public schools in California.

The school's mission is to develop students into not just academically proficient individuals but also well-rounded citizens equipped with necessary life skills. This is achieved through a curriculum that includes a variety of academic and non-academic classes and a range of extracurricular activities.

This school ranks as the top academic highschool in Anderson, CA and #2 in Shasta County (behind #1 UPrep) and top 50% in California.
