= Rick Bosetti =

American baseball player (born 1953)

- Center fielder
- Born: August 5, 1953 (age 72); Redding, California, U.S.
- Batted: Right Threw: Right

MLB debut
- September 9, 1976, for the Philadelphia Phillies

Last MLB appearance
- May 26, 1982, for the Oakland Athletics

MLB statistics
- Batting average: .250
- Home runs: 17
- Runs batted in: 133
- Stats at Baseball Reference

Teams
- Philadelphia Phillies (1976); St. Louis Cardinals (1977); Toronto Blue Jays (1978–1981); Oakland Athletics (1981–1982)

Richard Alan Bosetti (born August 5, 1953) is an American former professional baseball outfielder, who played in Major League Baseball (MLB) from 1976 to 1982 for the Philadelphia Phillies, St. Louis Cardinals, Toronto Blue Jays, and Oakland Athletics.

Bosetti attended Anderson Union High School in Anderson, California. He was drafted by the Philadelphia Phillies in the 7th round (114th overall) of the 1973 amateur draft while attending Shasta College and made his major league appearance on September 9, 1976. In 1979, Bosetti played in all 162 games for the Blue Jays, and in the same season led all AL outfielders in putouts, assists, and errors. Despite a relatively short career in the big leagues, he has the odd distinction of having urinated in the outfield of every major league baseball stadium of his era, a goal he claims to have accomplished by playing in both the American and National League.

During his time in Toronto, he quickly became one of the Blue Jays' most popular players, partly because he was the only member of the team at the time who lived in the city year-round.

On all four of the teams he played for in his career, he was teammates with pitcher Tom Underwood. Bosetti was released by the Oakland Athletics on September 6, 1982, at which point he retired.

After his baseball career, he returned to his hometown of Redding, Calif. and became involved in local business and politics. In 2006, he was elected to the Redding City Council, and Bosetti has also served as mayor of Redding. He ran for the California State Assembly District 1 in 2012, but lost by a 2-1 margin to Brian Dahle. He coached the Simpson University baseball team.

Rick now serves as general manager of the Redding Colt 45s collegiate baseball team.
