= Pioneer baby's grave =

Historic site in California

Pioneer Baby's Grave
- Location within California Location within the United States
- 40.465°N 122.324°W
- Location: CA 273, Redding, California

History
- Built: 1864

California Historical Landmark
- Designated: July 28, 1942
- Reference no.: 377

Pioneer Baby's Grave is a California Historical Landmark in Redding, California, listed as No. 377 on July 28, 1942. The grave marks the remains of 8-month-old Charles Brownstein, who died on December 14, 1864. Charles's parents traveled 40 miles in two-days by covered wagon to bury him at Shasta Hebrew Congregation's Jewish cemetery, the first one in the region.

California State Route 299 in 1923 routed around the grave. The Jewish cemetery was neglected until 1976, when the Redding Jewish Community Center was founded. The site is now cared for by the local Jewish Community Center.

The historical site marker is on California State Route 299, 0.75 miles West of Shasta. The marker was placed there on July 28, 1990 by the California Department of Parks and Recreation in collaboration with the Shasta Historical Society, the Kevin Hollis Moss Historical Fund, and Trinitarianus Chapter 62 of E Clampus Vitus.

== See also ==
- California Historical Landmarks in Shasta County
