= Rancho Buena Ventura =

Mexican land grant in California

Coordinates: 40.540°N 122.390°W

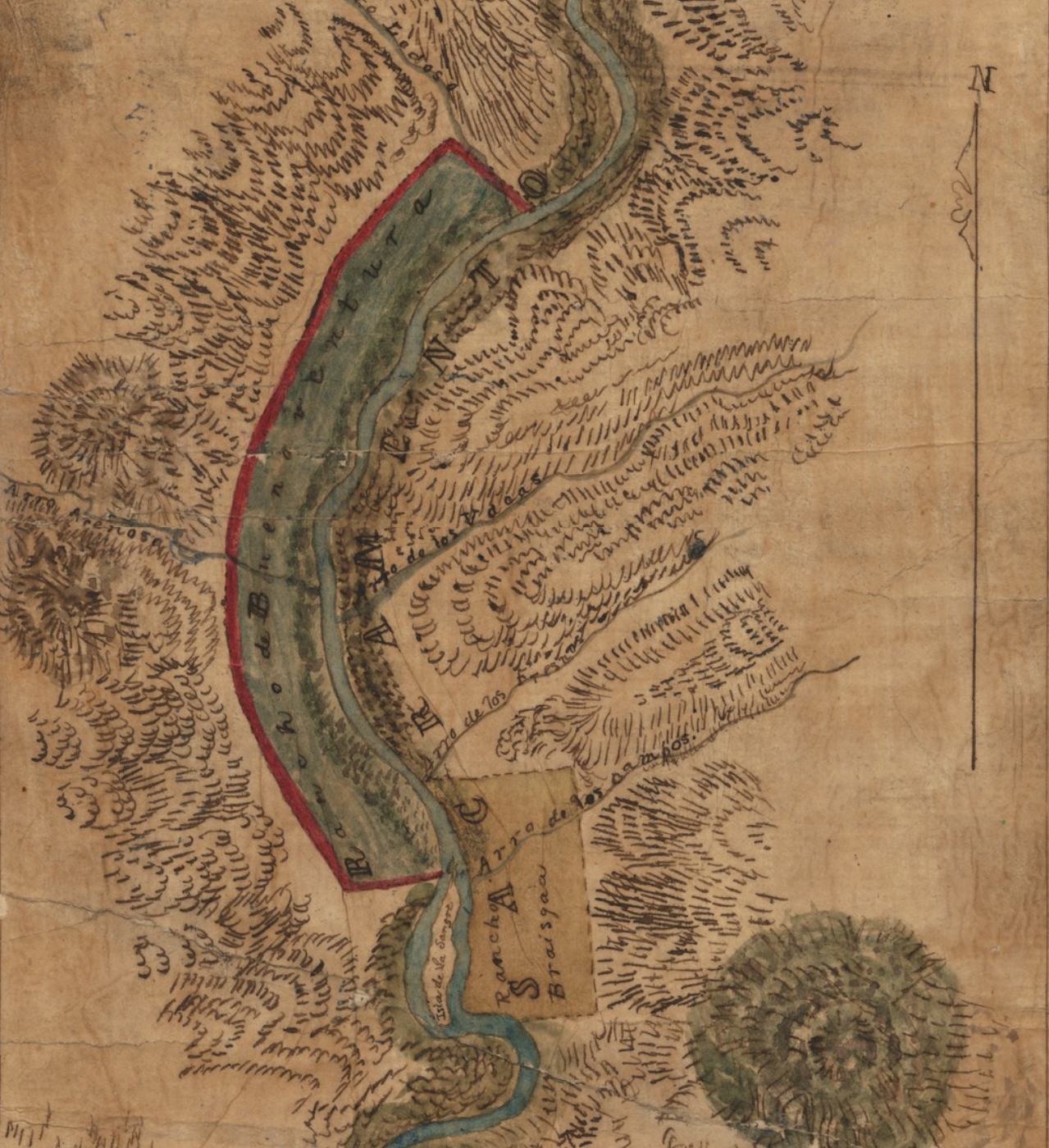
Redding's origins lie in Rancho Buena Ventura, a Mexican-era rancho granted by Governor Manuel Micheltorena to Pierson B. Reading

Rancho Buena Ventura (also called "San Buena Ventura") was a 26,632-acre (107.78 km^{2}) Mexican land grant in present-day Shasta County, California, given in 1844 by Governor Manuel Micheltorena to Major Pierson B. Reading (1816–1868). The land grant is named for the former name of the adjacent Sacramento River, Buena Ventura, which meant good fortune in Spanish. The grant extended some nineteen miles on the west side of the Sacramento River, from Cottonwood Creek on the south to Salt Creek on the north, and extended approximately three miles west of the Sacramento River the length of the grant. The grant encompassed present day towns of Anderson, Cottonwood and Redding. This was the northernmost land grant in California; the smaller Rancho Breisgau faced the southernmost portion of the Rancho on the east bank of the river. Redding, however, was not named for Major Reading; it was named for B. B. Redding, a land agent for the Central Pacific Railroad.

== History ==
Governor Micheltorena and John Sutter, his alcalde, granted Rancho Buena Ventura to Pierson B. Reading (listed as Pearson B. Reading in the land case documents) in 1844. Reading, who was at that time working for John Sutter at Sutter's Fort in Sacramento as a clerk and trapper, visited the land grant but did not move onto it. He stocked the land with cattle and built a house for his overseer but it was burned down by natives in 1846. Reading was active in promoting the Bear Flag Revolt of 1846. After serving as an artillery lieutenant then as paymaster at the rank of major in a battalion led by John C. Frémont, he built a permanent adobe dwelling and settled on his grant in 1847. He became the second (after Lansford Hastings) permanent settler of what was to become Shasta County.

With the cession of California to the United States following the Mexican-American War, the 1848 Treaty of Guadalupe Hidalgo provided that the land grants would be honored. As required by the Land Act of 1851, a claim for Rancho Buena Ventura was filed with the Public Land Commission in 1852. The US appealed the claim on the grounds that Reading was not a Mexican citizen. In 1854 Reading went to Washington, D.C. for the hearing before the US Supreme Court on his land grant claims. There he met and married Fanny Wallace Washington. The claim was upheld by the Supreme Court and the grant was patented to Pearson B. Reading in 1857.

The first land sale was made in 1853. By 1866, over 5,000 acres (20.2 km^{2}) of the land grant was sold. In 1866, Reading borrowed from the estate of his longtime friend Samuel J. Hensley, using the remaining rancho lands as collateral. After Reading's unexpected death in 1868, the remaining rancho lands were sold to James Ben Ali Haggin at public auction in 1871 to satisfy the unpaid debt. After the auction, the only remaining land from the original land grant was the one square mile (640 acres (2.6 km^{2})) Washington section purchased by Fanny Washington's mother.
