= McArthur, California =

McArthur
- Unincorporated Community; Census Designated Place
- Location in Shasta County and the state of California
- Coordinates: 41°3′2″N 121°23′59″W
- Country: United States
- State: California
- County: Shasta

Area
  - Total: 1.032 sq mi (2.672 km^{2})
  - Land: 1.001 sq mi (2.593 km^{2})
  - Water: 0.030 sq mi (0.078 km^{2}) 2.93%
- Elevation: 3,310 ft (1,009 m)

Population (2020)
  - Total: 334
  - Density: 334/sq mi (129/km^{2})
- Time zone: UTC-8 (Pacific (PST))
  - Summer (DST): UTC-7 (PDT)
- ZIP code: 96056
- Area code: 530
- FIPS code: 06-44700
- GNIS feature ID: 0263294

McArthur is a census-designated place (CDP) in Shasta County, California, United States. Its population is 334 as of the 2020 census, down from 338 from the 2010 census. McArthur is a small ranching community, located 4 mi east of Fall River Mills.

== Government ==
Community and municipal services are primarily provided by special districts: the Fall River Valley Community Services District provides water; fire protection is provided by the Fall River Valley Fire Protection District; ambulance service is provided by the Mayers Memorial Hospital District.

== Geography ==
McArthur is located at 41°3′2″N 121°23′59″W (41.050534, -121.399816).

According to the United States Census Bureau, the CDP has a total area of 1.0 square mile (2.6 km^{2}), 97.07% of it land and 2.93% of it water.

=== Climate ===
According to the Köppen climate classification system, McArthur has a warm-summer Mediterranean climate, abbreviated "Csb" on climate maps.

Climate data for McArthur
Month	Jan	Feb	Mar	Apr	May	Jun	Jul	Aug	Sep	Oct	Nov	Dec	Year
Record high °F (°C)	66 (19)	72 (22)	79 (26)	86 (30)	92 (33)	103 (39)	106 (41)	104 (40)	103 (39)	94 (34)	82 (28)	63 (17)	106 (41)
Mean daily maximum °F (°C)	43.0 (6.1)	47.9 (8.8)	54.5 (12.5)	62.4 (16.9)	70.8 (21.6)	78.2 (25.7)	87.6 (30.9)	86.4 (30.2)	80.4 (26.9)	68.6 (20.3)	54.9 (12.7)	44.7 (7.1)	65.2 (18.4)
Mean daily minimum °F (°C)	20.7 (−6.3)	24.2 (−4.3)	29.0 (−1.7)	34.3 (1.3)	40.3 (4.6)	45.9 (7.7)	49.9 (9.9)	46.4 (8.0)	40.9 (4.9)	33.4 (0.8)	26.6 (−3.0)	22.6 (−5.2)	34.5 (1.4)
Record low °F (°C)	−18 (−28)	−15 (−26)	3 (−16)	10 (−12)	24 (−4)	28 (−2)	35 (2)	30 (−1)	21 (−6)	7 (−14)	−17 (−27)	−18 (−28)	27.4 (−2.6)
Average precipitation inches (mm)	2.69 (68)	2.38 (60)	2.20 (56)	1.53 (39)	1.22 (31)	0.85 (22)	0.18 (4.6)	0.18 (4.6)	0.47 (12)	1.23 (31)	2.35 (60)	2.94 (75)	18.22 (463.2)
Average snowfall inches (cm)	8.4 (21)	4.1 (10)	3.2 (8.1)	3.6 (9.1)	0.9 (2.3)	0.1 (0.25)	0 (0)	0 (0)	0.5 (1.3)	0.4 (1.0)	2.7 (6.9)	11 (28)	34.9 (89)
Average precipitation days	8	6	7	5	7	6	1	2	2	4	8	10	66
Source 1: WeatherBase
Source 2: National Weather Service

== Demographics ==
Historical population
Census	Pop.	Note	%±
2000	365		—
2010	338		−7.4%
2020	334		−1.2%
U.S. Decennial Census; 1860–1870 1880-1890; 1900 1910 1920; 1930 1940 1950; 1960 1970 1980; 1990 2000 2010

McArthur first appeared as a census designated place in the 2000 U.S. census.

=== 2020 ===
The 2020 United States census reported that McArthur had a population of 334. The population density was 333.7 inhabitants per square mile (128.8/km^{2}). The racial makeup of McArthur was 191 (57.2%) White, 3 (0.9%) African American, 10 (3.0%) Native American, 1 (0.3%) Asian, 0 (0.0%) Pacific Islander, 71 (21.3%) from other races, and 58 (17.4%) from two or more races. Hispanic or Latino of any race were 141 persons (42.2%).

The whole population lived in households. There were 130 households, out of which 32 (24.6%) had children under the age of 18 living in them, 73 (56.2%) were married-couple households, 4 (3.1%) were cohabiting couple households, 47 (36.2%) had a female householder with no partner present, and 6 (4.6%) had a male householder with no partner present. 43 households (33.1%) were one person, and 27 (20.8%) were one person aged 65 or older. The average household size was 2.57. There were 85 families (65.4% of all households).

The age distribution was 79 people (23.7%) under the age of 18, 22 people (6.6%) aged 18 to 24, 61 people (18.3%) aged 25 to 44, 97 people (29.0%) aged 45 to 64, and 75 people (22.5%) who were 65 years of age or older. The median age was 46.2 years. For every 100 females, there were 101.2 males.

There were 147 housing units at an average density of 146.9 units per square mile (56.7 units/km^{2}), of which 130 (88.4%) were occupied. Of these, 116 (89.2%) were owner-occupied, and 14 (10.8%) were occupied by renters.

=== 2010 ===
The 2010 United States census reported that McArthur had a population of 338. The population density was 332.7 inhabitants per square mile (128.5/km^{2}). The racial makeup of McArthur was 217 (64.2%) White, 0 (0.0%) African American, 15 (4.4%) Native American, 0 (0.0%) Asian, 0 (0.0%) Pacific Islander, 98 (29.0%) from other races, and 8 (2.4%) from two or more races. Hispanic or Latino of any race were 119 persons (35.2%).

The Census reported that 338 people (100% of the population) lived in households, 0 (0%) lived in non-institutionalized group quarters, and 0 (0%) were institutionalized.

There were 127 households, out of which 49 (38.6%) had children under the age of 18 living in them, 72 (56.7%) were opposite-sex married couples living together, 17 (13.4%) had a female householder with no husband present, 4 (3.1%) had a male householder with no wife present. There were 9 (7.1%) unmarried opposite-sex partnerships, and 1 (0.8%) same-sex married couples or partnerships. 24 households (18.9%) were made up of individuals, and 15 (11.8%) had someone living alone who was 65 years of age or older. The average household size was 2.66. There were 93 families (73.2% of all households); the average family size was 3.04.

The population was spread out, with 91 people (26.9%) under the age of 18, 24 people (7.1%) aged 18 to 24, 78 people (23.1%) aged 25 to 44, 89 people (26.3%) aged 45 to 64, and 56 people (16.6%) who were 65 years of age or older. The median age was 39.6 years. For every 100 females, there were 103.6 males. For every 100 females age 18 and over, there were 107.6 males.

There were 143 housing units at an average density of 140.8 per square mile (54.4/km^{2}), of which 95 (74.8%) were owner-occupied, and 32 (25.2%) were occupied by renters. The homeowner vacancy rate was 3.1%; the rental vacancy rate was 5.9%. 244 people (72.2% of the population) lived in owner-occupied housing units and 94 people (27.8%) lived in rental housing units.

=== 2000 ===
As of the census of 2000, the median income for a household in the CDP was $16,116, and the median income for a family was $23,125. Males had a median income of $27,188 versus $19,750 for females. The per capita income for the CDP was $9,813. About 36.3% of families and 36.0% of the population were below the poverty line, including 44.1% of those under age 18 and 36.0% of those age 65 or over.

== Politics ==
In the state legislature McArthur is in the 1st senatorial district, represented by Republican Megan Dahle, and the 1st Assembly district, represented by Republican Heather Hadwick.

Federally, McArthur is in California's 1st congressional district, represented by Republican James Gallagher.
