= Pierson B. Reading =

American politician

Pierson Barton Reading
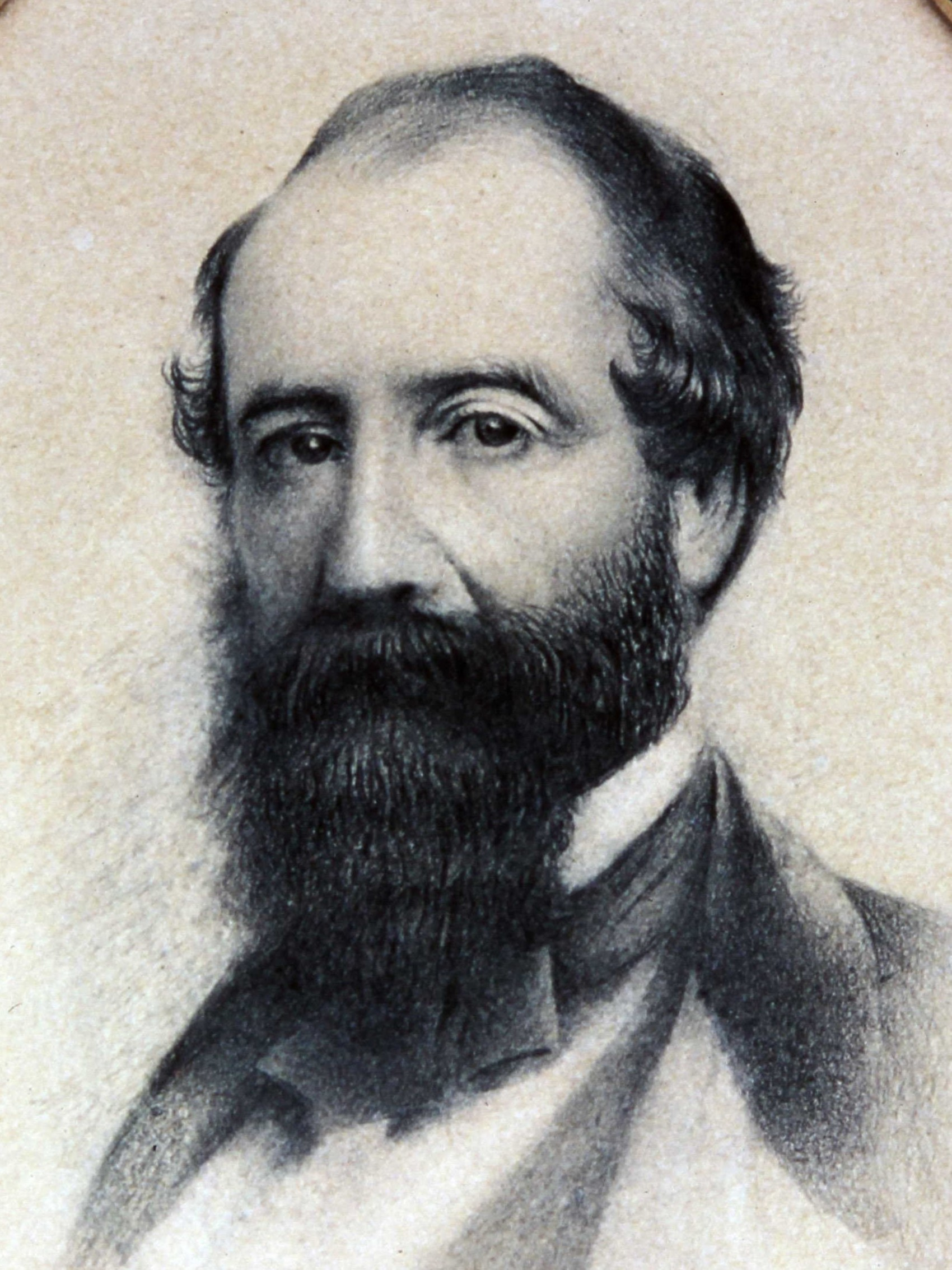
- Born: November 26, 1816; New Jersey, US
- Died: May 29, 1868 (aged 51); Shasta County, California, US
- Spouse: Fanny Washington

Pierson Barton Reading (November 26, 1816 – May 29, 1868), also referred to as Pearson, Parson, and P. B. Reading, was a California pioneer.

== Life ==
Reading was born in New Jersey. He came across country to California with Samuel J. Hensley as a member of the Chiles-Walker party in 1843. In 1844, Reading entered the service of General Sutter as a clerk, explorer, and chief of trappers. He received the 26,632-acre (10,778 ha) Mexican land grant Rancho Buena Ventura in 1844 for the area occupied by today's Redding, California, and Cottonwood, California, along the Sacramento River. In the Winter of 1844–45, while Sutter was marching with about one hundred men to join Governor Michaeltorena, Reading was in command at Sutters Fort. In 1846, Reading was a participant in the Bear Flag Revolt. In the Mexican–American War, Reading enlisted under Fremont and was appointed Paymaster of the California Battalion, with the rank of Major. In 1848 Reading was among the first to visit James W. Marshall's gold discovery in Coloma, California – and shortly after engaged extensively in prospecting for gold in Shasta County, and along the Trinity River. In the fall of 1849, Reading fitted out an expedition to discover the bay into which he supposed the Trinity and Klamath Rivers must empty. From 1849 to 1850, Reading operated a store in Sacramento with Samuel J. Hensley and Jacob R. Snyder. He was the Whig candidate for Governor of California in 1851, and U.S. Senate in 1852.

In 1854 Reading went to Washington, D.C. for the US Supreme Court hearing on his land grant claim. There he met and married Fanny Wallace Washington. They had six children together.

Reading returned to his Rancho Buena Ventura in Shasta County in 1856, where he remained until his death in 1868.

== See also ==
- California Historical Landmarks in Shasta County
- Reading Adobe
- Clear Creek Shasta Gold find site
- Reading's Bar Shasta Gold find site

Party political offices
First	Whig nominee for Governor of California; 1851	Succeeded by William Waldo
