= Anderson, California =

City in California, United States

- City
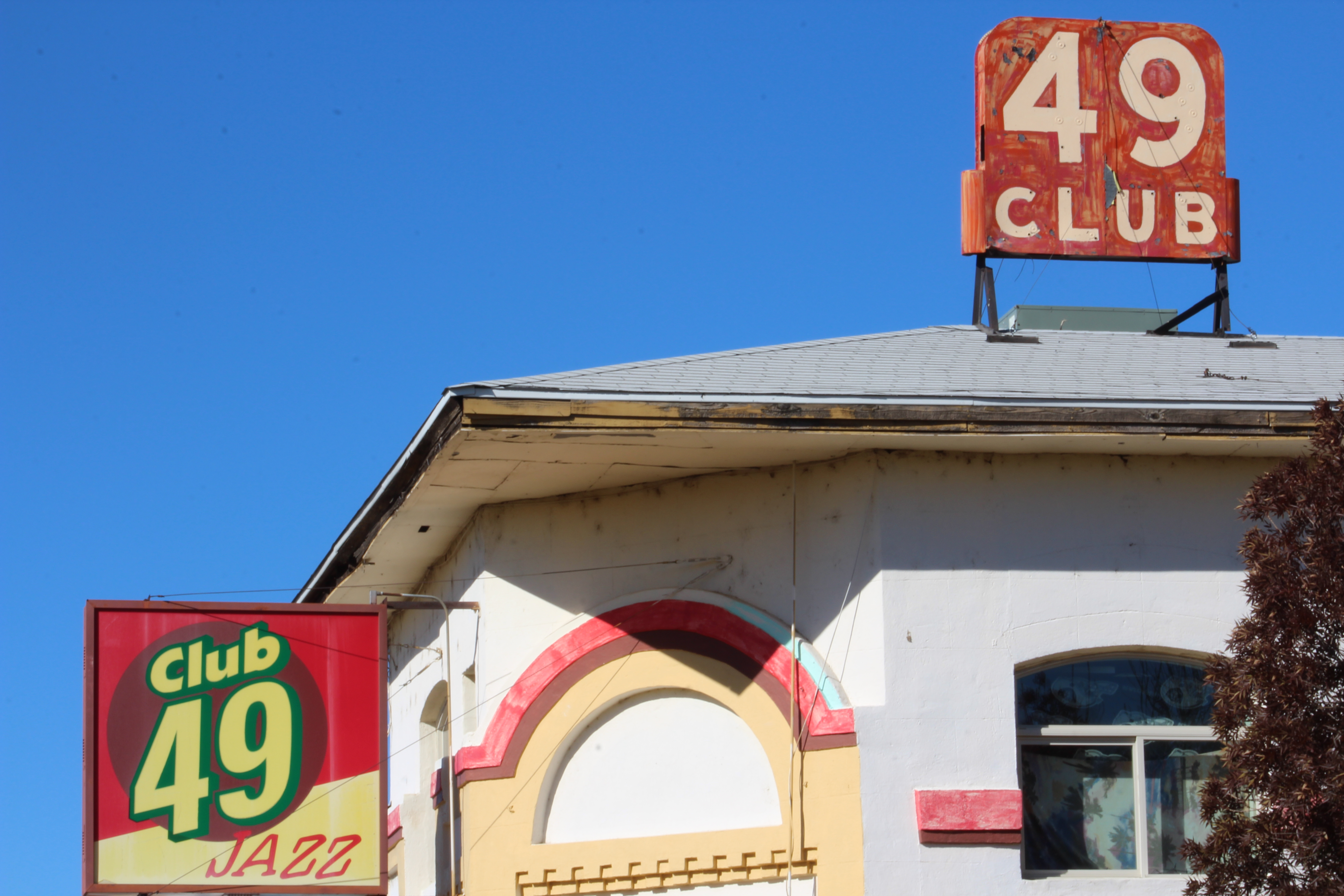
- Club 49

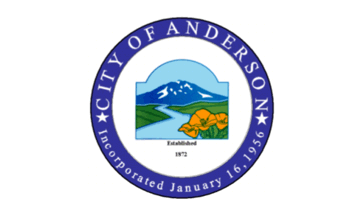
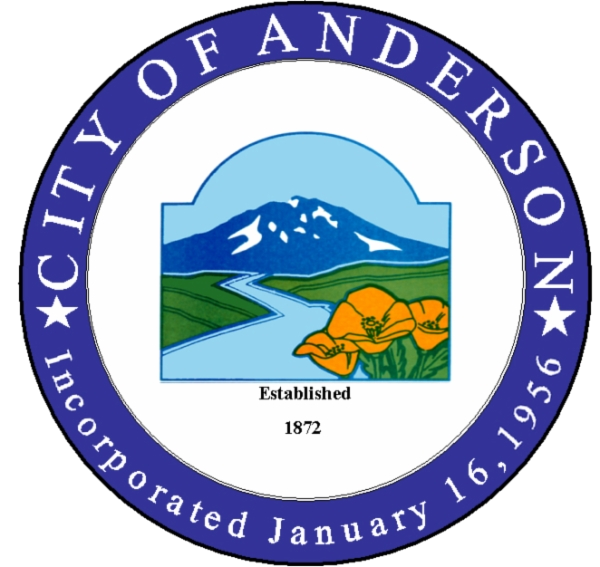
- Flag Seal
- Nickname: City of Opportunity
- Interactive map of Anderson, California
- Location in California Anderson, California (the United States) Anderson, California (North America)
- Coordinates: 40°27′8″N 122°17′48″W
- Country: United States
- State: California
- County: Shasta
- Incorporated: January 16, 1956

Government
  - Type: Council-manager
  - City council: Mayor Susie Baugh; Vice Mayor Baron V. Browning; Melissa Hunt; Stan Neutze; Mike Gallagher

Area
  - Total: 7.21 sq mi (18.68 km^{2})
  - Land: 7.03 sq mi (18.21 km^{2})
  - Water: 0.18 sq mi (0.47 km^{2}) 3.74%
- Elevation: 433 ft (132 m)

Population (2020)
  - Total: 11,323
  - Density: 1,610.4/sq mi (621.77/km^{2})
- Time zone: UTC-8 (Pacific (PST))
  - Summer (DST): UTC-7 (PDT)
- ZIP code: 96007
- Area code(s): 530, 837
- FIPS code: 06-02042
- GNIS feature ID: 0277470
- Website: http://ci.anderson.ca.us/

Anderson is a city in Shasta County, California, United States, approximately 10 miles (16 km) south of Redding. Its population is 11,323 as of the 2020 census, up from 9,932 from the 2010 census.

Located 138 miles (222 km) north of Sacramento, the city's roots are as a railroad town near the northern tip of the Central Valley of California.

The city was named after ranch owner Elias Anderson, who granted the Oregon and California Railroad trackage rights and land for a station. Elias Anderson was a farmer, hotel owner, and postmaster. Elias married Elizabeth Summers in 1839 and built the Prairie House in the community of Cottonwood in 1856 on the south side of Cottonwood Creek (now Tehama County).

Elias Anderson purchased the American Ranch from Thomas Freeman in 1856 and built the American Ranch Hotel in what would become downtown Anderson, California. The post office was inside the hotel. Elias Anderson purchased 210 acres (85 ha) from Pierson B. Reading in 1865 and deeded a right-of-way through his property to Central Pacific Railroad in 1872; in return the railroad gave the depot his name. Elias and Elizabeth Anderson built their new home at 2865 East Street in 1873; it no longer exists. While it stood, the house was designated as California Historical Landmark No. 12. In 1876 the Andersons moved their ranch hotel to the corner of Main and Ferry Streets.

== History ==
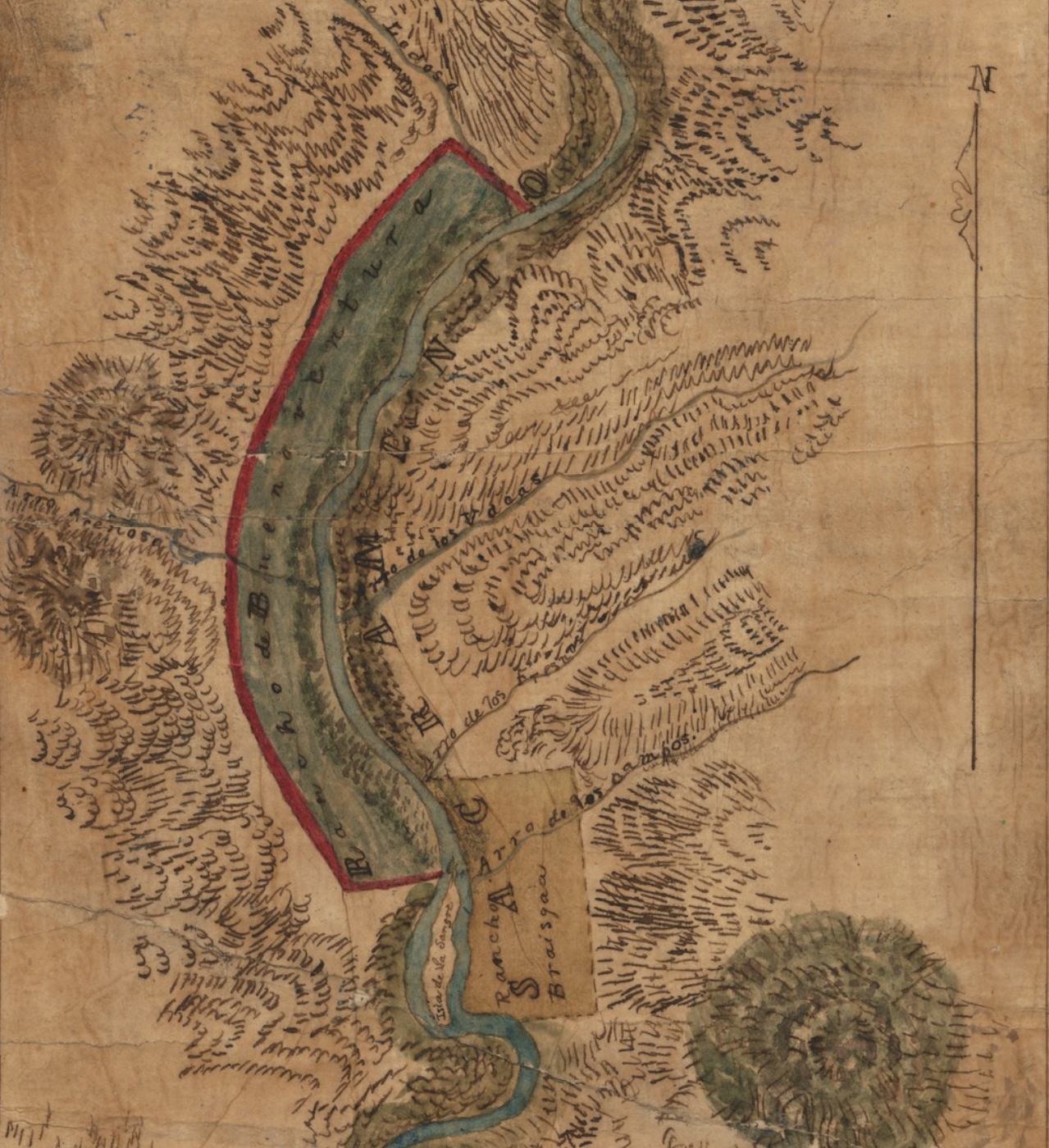
Anderson was originally a part of Rancho Buena Ventura, a Mexican-era rancho granted by Governor Manuel Micheltorena to Pierson B. Reading.

Railroad activity came to the area in 1872. Anderson is named after Elias Anderson, who owned the largest land grant in the vicinity. The city's Anderson River Park sits on part of the original land grant owned by Anderson.

== Geography ==
Anderson is located at 40°27′08″N 122°17′48″W.

According to the United States Census Bureau, the city has a total area of 7.2 square miles (19 km^{2}), of which 7.0 square miles (18 km^{2}) is land and 0.2 square miles (0.5 km^{2}) (2.50%) is water.

=== Climate ===
According to the Köppen Climate Classification system, Anderson has a Hot-summer Mediterranean climate, abbreviated "Csa" on climate maps.

== Demographics ==
Historical population
Census	Pop.	Note	%±
1890	508		—
1960	4,492		—
1970	5,492		22.3%
1980	7,381		34.4%
1990	8,299		12.4%
2000	9,022		8.7%
2010	9,932		10.1%
2020	11,323		14.0%
2024 (est.)	11,171	▼	−1.3%
U.S. Decennial Census

=== 2020 census ===
As of the 2020 census, Anderson had a population of 11,323 and a population density of 1,610.4 inhabitants per square mile (621.8/km^{2}). The median age was 37.4 years. 25.5% of residents were under the age of 18 and 18.1% of residents were 65 years of age or older. For every 100 females there were 89.7 males, and for every 100 females age 18 and over there were 84.8 males age 18 and over.

The census reported that 98.8% of the population lived in households, 0.1% lived in non-institutionalized group quarters, and 1.1% were institutionalized. 97.3% of residents lived in urban areas, while 2.7% lived in rural areas.

There were 4,502 households in Anderson, of which 33.8% had children under the age of 18 living in them. Of all households, 36.2% were married-couple households, 9.0% were cohabiting couple households, 18.0% were households with a male householder and no spouse or partner present, and 36.8% were households with a female householder and no spouse or partner present. About 31.1% of all households were made up of individuals and 15.9% had someone living alone who was 65 years of age or older. The average household size was 2.48. There were 2,764 families (61.4% of all households).

There were 4,732 housing units, of which 4.9% were vacant. The homeowner vacancy rate was 1.9% and the rental vacancy rate was 3.2%. Of the 4,502 occupied housing units, 49.6% were owner-occupied and 50.4% were occupied by renters.

Racial composition as of the 2020 census
Race	Number	Percent
White	8,588	75.8%
Black or African American	119	1.1%
American Indian and Alaska Native	430	3.8%
Asian	339	3.0%
Native Hawaiian and Other Pacific Islander	30	0.3%
Some other race	525	4.6%
Two or more races	1,292	11.4%
Hispanic or Latino (of any race)	1,587	14.0%

=== 2023 ACS 5-year estimates ===
In 2023, the US Census Bureau estimated that the median household income was $50,306, and the per capita income was $28,728. About 15.8% of families and 20.4% of the population were below the poverty line.

=== Anderson area ===
In areas north of Anderson, 4,036 live in unincorporated urban areas along Highway 273. Another 8,342 live in rural areas, including at least 3,500 people in the communities of Olinda and Happy Valley, which is west of Anderson and southwest of Redding. A total of 21,400 people live in the entire Anderson area, including Olinda, Happy Valley, and some areas south of Churn Creek Bottom.

== Politics ==
In the state legislature Anderson is located in the 1st senatorial district, represented by Republican Megan Dahle, and the 1st Assembly district, represented by Republican Heather Hadwick.

Federally, Anderson is in California's 1st congressional district, represented by Republican James Gallagher.

== Economy ==
Sierra Pacific Industries is headquartered in Anderson.

== Education ==
=== High schools ===
- Anderson Union High School
- North Valley High School
- Anderson New Technology High School

=== Elementary schools ===
- Anderson Heights Elementary School
- Anderson Middle School
- Northern Summit Academy
- Meadow Lane Elementary

== Recreation ==
The city is home to Anderson River Park, North Volonte Park, and South Volonte Park.

Anderson River Park is located off of Stingy Ln. down Rupert Rd. The park is situated on the Sacramento River. The park consists of athletic fields, picnic areas, fishing access, play structures, and a disc golf course.

In fall 2020, the city added River Splash a Splash pad, Shasta County's newest water play park to the park. River Splash has three large shade structures, picnic tables, seating, lawn areas, restrooms, and a 106-feet diameter water play area. The water features include above-ground items such as water spray tunnels, a tipping bucket of water and water jets. All 35 water jets that are cast into the concrete play area have LED lights that are timed with the water spray.

North Volonte Park is located off South St. on Emily Rd. North Volonte Park is separated from South Volonte Park. North Volonte Park is a developed park which consists of softball and baseball fields. It also has a skate park.

South Volonte Park is located behind North Volonte Park. South Volonte Park consists of wetlands that are outlined by a jogging trail. It also contains exercise equipment.

Shasta Speedway is a short oval racetrack opened in the 1940s, which current hosts an annual ARCA Menards Series West stock car race as well as local weekly races.
