= Tule River (Shasta County, California) =

Location
- Country: United States
- State: California
- Region: Shasta County, California
- City: Fall River Mills, California

Physical characteristics
- Source: Ahjumavi Lava Springs
  - coordinates: 41°06′37″N 121°24′42″W
  - elevation: 3,310 ft (1,010 m)
- Mouth
  - location: Fall River, California
  - coordinates: 41°04′20″N 121°27′50″W
  - elevation: 3,307 ft (1,008 m)

Basin features
- Tributaries
  - right: Ja She Creek, Little Tule River

The Tule River is a 5.7-mile-long (9.2 km) river tributary to the Fall River. The river is a complex of spring-fed lakes and waterways originating in Ahjumawi Lava Springs State Park in north-eastern Shasta County in northern California. From the Fall River, its waters continue to the Pit River and then the Sacramento River to the Pacific Ocean.

== History ==
The Tule River sources in Ahjumawi Lava Springs State Park, the ancestral homeland of a band of the Pit River Indians known as the Achomawi (also spelled Ajumawi, Achumawi, and Ahjumawi) whose name translates to "where the waters come together". The Achomawi are one of eleven bands of the Pit River Tribe of native peoples. The park lands were deeded to the state in 1975 by Ivy Horr, whose family logged and raised cattle in the area after they bought it in 1944.

The Tule River is named for a common bulrush or cattail known as "tule".

== Ecology and conservation ==
The Fall River Conservancy and the Fall River Resource Conservation District both work to restore the Fall River and its tributary, the Tule River. The lake complex and marshlands are an important stopover on the Pacific Flyway for Canada and snow geese as well as American white pelicans, and blue-winged teals. Other bird species include Lewis's woodpeckers, northern pygmy owls, bald eagles and a large population of ospreys which nest in juniper trees, a situation unique to the area. Black-tailed deer and coyote (Canis latrans) frequent the grasslands. Non-native muskrats can be seen in the marshes and water's edges. The indigenous Shasta crayfish is considered endangered by state and federal agencies. Only three inches long at maturity, Shasta crayfish numbers have diminished since the introduction of non-native crayfish species.

Big Lake and Horr Pond are used primarily for waterfowl hunting and supports a warm water fishery year round and a trout fishery during the general trout season. In addition sportfisherman angle for non-native largemouth black bass Micropterus salmoides, and brown bullheads (Ameiurus nebulosus). The watershed also hosts Sacramento suckers (Catostomus occidentalis occidentalis) and self-sustaining populations of native rainbow trout (Oncorhynchus mykiss) and non-native brown trout (Salmo trutta).

McArthur Swamp is a 7,400-acre area of reclaimed wetlands and open water north of the town of McArthur and south of Big Lake and the Tule River. It provides valuable waterfowl habitat on the Pacific Flyway and is also grazed. PG&E proposes to donate McArthur Swamp and the nearby parcel acquired by a land trade with State Parks (see Lake Britton) to the Fall River Resource Conservation District, which is to manage it subject to a strict easement.

== Watershed and course ==
The Tule River and lakes complex drains over 11,000 acres and is almost more a series of lakes than river. Ahjumavi Lava Springs is the source in northern Big Lake, from which waters flow southwest into Horr Pond and thence to the Fall River, after picking up flows from Ja She Creek and Little Tule River. The Little Tule River flows originate as Lava Creek then Eastman Lake before the Little Tule River confluence with the Tule River. The lava springs feeding the Big Lake Complex, the headwaters of the Tule River, are the source of 75% of the water in the Fall River and supply about 85% of the flow of the Pit River during the summer months.

== See also ==
- Fall River
- Pit River
