= Bevo LeBourveau =

American baseball player (1896-1947)

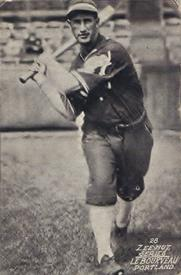
- Outfielder
- Born: August 24, 1896; Dana, California, U.S.
- Died: December 10, 1947 (aged 51); Nevada City, California, U.S.
- Batted: Left Threw: Right

MLB debut
- September 9, 1919, for the Philadelphia Phillies

Last MLB appearance
- October 5, 1929, for the Philadelphia Athletics

MLB statistics
- Batting average: .275
- Home runs: 11
- Runs batted in: 69
- Stats at Baseball Reference

Teams
- Philadelphia Phillies (1919–1922); Philadelphia Athletics (1929)

DeWitt Wiley "Bevo" LeBourveau (August 24, 1896 – December 10, 1947) was an American professional baseball player, an outfielder who appeared in 280 Major League games played and 1,584 contests in Minor League Baseball over 17 seasons (1918–1934). Born in Dana, California, LeBourveau attended Santa Clara University. He stood 5 feet 11 inches (1.80 m) tall, weighed 175 pounds (79 kg), batted left-handed and threw right-handed.

LeBourveau compiled a .349 lifetime batting average in the minors, leading the top-level American Association twice in hitting as a member of the Toledo Mud Hens, in 1926 (.377) and 1930 (.380). Each season he exceeded 100 runs batted in — the only times he passed the century mark in RBI during his career.

As a Major Leaguer, he played in 268 games over four years (1919–1922) with the Philadelphia Phillies, then a dozen more games in a 1929 trial with the city's American League club, the Athletics of Connie Mack. In 788 at bats, he collected 217 hits, including 27 doubles and 11 triples as well as 11 home runs. In the minors, his 2,315 hits included 120 home runs.

LeBourveau became a police officer in Placerville, California, after his baseball career ended in 1934; he died in his sleep at age 51 in Nevada City.
