= Ahjumawi Lava Springs State Park =

State park in Shasta County, California, US

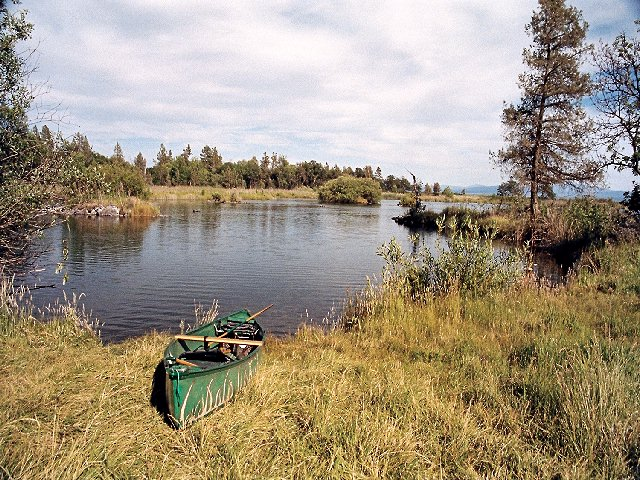
- View east from the Ja-She Campground

- Location within California Location within the United States
- Location: Shasta County, California, United States
- Nearest city: McArthur, California
- Coordinates: 41°8′10″N 121°25′4″W
- Area: 5,930 acres (24.0 km^{2})
- Established: 1975
- Governing body: California Department of Parks and Recreation

Ahjumawi Lava Springs State Park is a state park of California in the United States. It is located in remote northeastern Shasta County and is only accessible to the public by boat.

The park is 4 miles (6.4 km) in length and no more than 1 mile (1.6 km) wide, and has over 13 miles (21 km) of shoreline. It preserves a wilderness of freshwater springs and geologically recent lava flows. Waterways include the Fall River and associated creeks and lakes. The shoreline has blue bays and tree-studded islets along its length. Near the springs are the remains of fish traps built by Native Californian tribes such as the Achomawi, for whom the park is named. Low rock walls enclose shallow pools where they captured sucker and trout. About two thirds of the park's 5,930 acres (2,400 ha) is covered by jagged black basalt deposited in lava flows within the last two to five thousand years.

The state of California acquired the land from private owners in 1975.

== History ==
Pacific Gas & Electric owned large tracts of the local swampland. Much of the shoreline of the park is on Big Lake, which was created when levees and canals were installed. A muskrat farm was operated there until the 1930s. Muskrats can still be seen in the local marshes. The non-native species is notorious for altering wetland habitat, increasing the likelihood of floods.

== Visiting the park ==
There are no public roads leading to the park. Private motor vehicles are prohibited within. Visitors can launch boats into Big Lake at a Pacific Gas & Electric (PG&E) public boat launch known as Rat Farm.

There are three basic campsites. Visitors can traverse narrow waterways in canoes or kayaks. There are about 20 miles of hiking trails. Fishing is allowed but hunting is prohibited.

== Native Americans ==
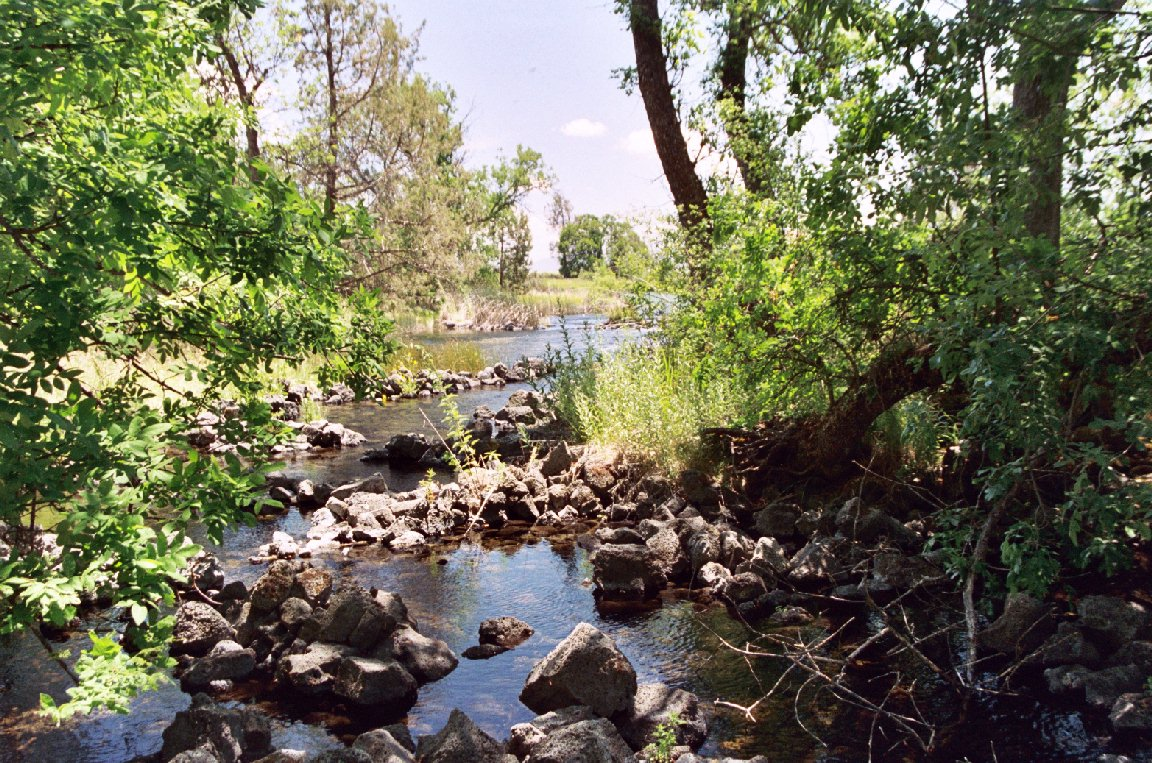
Ahjumawi fish traps showing inner chambers

The name of the park honors the Achomawi (also spelled Ajumawi, Achumawi, and Ahjumawi) whose name translates to "where the waters come together". The park is situated at the confluence of the Fall River, a tributary of the Pit River, with several smaller creeks and streams. The Achomawi are one of eleven bands of the Pit River Tribe of native peoples. These resident people tended the local waterways, monitoring spawning beds and limiting their catches to conserve populations of the fish they used for food. The Achomawi still live in the area.

== Natural history ==
The park sits on "one of the nation's largest systems of underwater springs." They produce some 1.2 billion US gallons (4.5×10^{9} L) of fresh water per day into the aboveground waterways. Water in the springs originate as snowmelt from the Medicine Lake Volcano highlands.

The park is in an area where the Modoc Plateau transitions to a more coastal bioregion. The former region was formed by volcanic activity and has many associated geological features, such as lava tubes and craters that fill with spring water.

The local flora includes pines, ceanothus, western juniper, birchleaf and curlleaf mountain mahogany, and Garry oak. Birds in the area include Canada geese, snow geese, American white pelicans, blue-winged teal, Lewis's woodpeckers, northern pygmy owls, and ospreys. Other animals include black-tailed deer and coyotes.
