= Fall River Mills Airport =

- IATA: none; ICAO: none; FAA LID: O89

Summary
- Airport type: Public
- Location: Fall River Mills, California
- Elevation AMSL: 3,323 ft / 1,013 m
- Coordinates: 41°01′07.587″N 121°25′59.93″W
- Interactive map of Fall River Mills Airport

Runways
Direction	Length		Surface
Direction	ft	m	Surface
2/20	5,000	1,524	Asphalt

Fall River Mills Airport (FAA LID: O89) is a public airport located off Main Street in downtown Fall River Mills, serving Shasta County, northern California, United States.

The airport has one runway, and is mostly used for general aviation. It is the only airport within 75 miles (121 km) of Redding and Alturas.

== Facilities ==
Fall River Mills Airport has one runway:

- Runway 2/20: 5,000 x 75 ft (1,524 x 23 m), surface: asphalt

The airport has nine permanent t-hangars, five portable hangars, and approximately 30 tie-downs. It provides aviation fuel sales. The airport is equipped with runway lights which are designed to be turned on at night by the pilots as they approach.

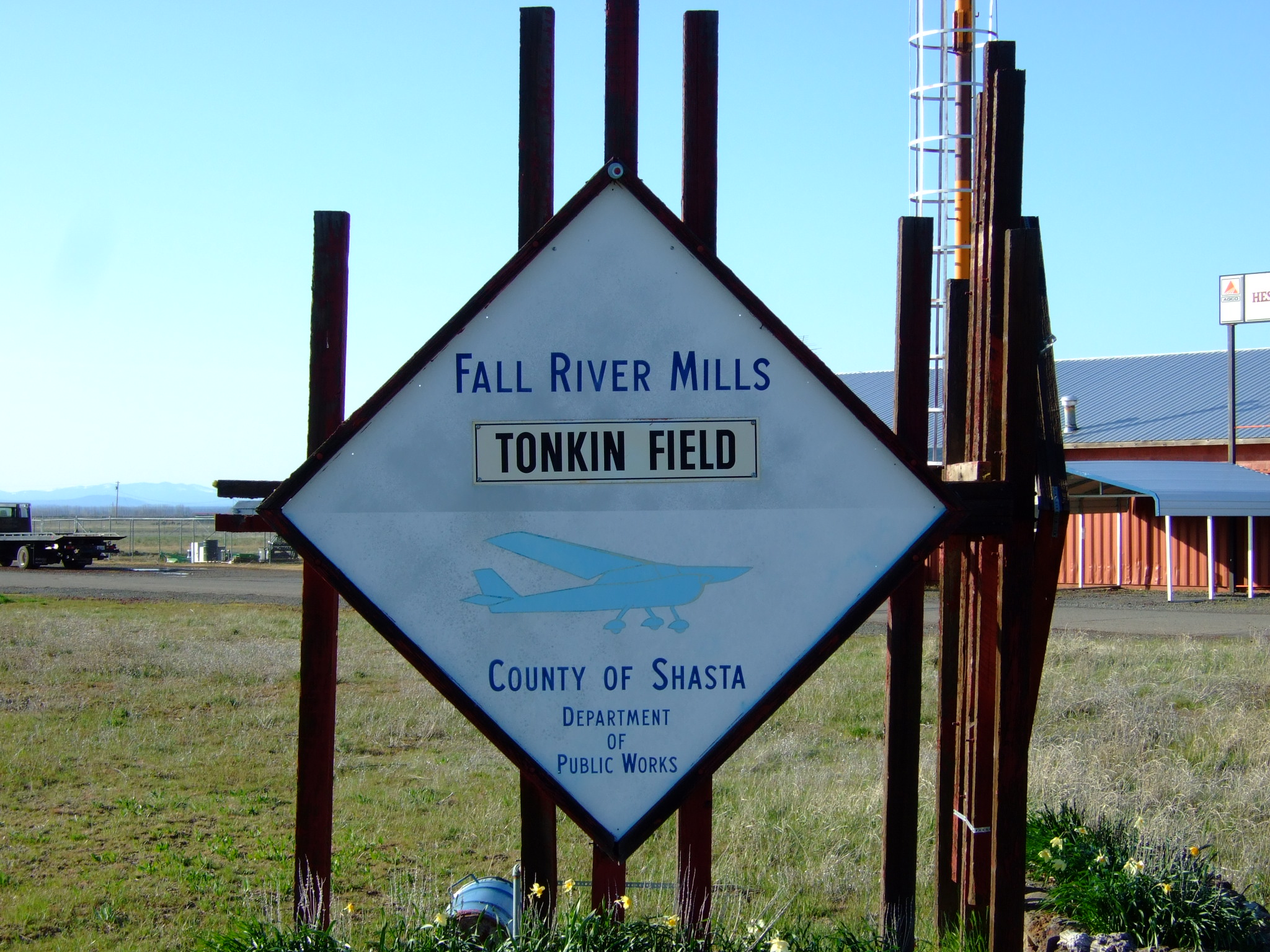
Sign for Tonkin Field at Fall River Mills Airport

== History ==
The airport was originally built in the 1940s as Tonkin Field, a location to train pilots for World War II. Over the years, the airport has been maintained and upgraded largely due to funding provided from the California Aid to Airports Program (CAAP).
