= Mark Wilson (American football) =

American football player (born 1980)

No. 62, 63, 71
- Position: Offensive tackle

Personal information
- Born: November 11, 1980 (age 45); San Jose, California, U.S.
- Listed height: 6 ft 7 in (2.01 m)
- Listed weight: 320 lb (145 kg)

Career information
- High school: Fall River Mills (CA)
- College: California
- NFL draft: 2004: 5th round, 151st overall pick

Career history
- Washington Redskins (2004); Minnesota Vikings (2005–2006)*; Oakland Raiders (2006–2008); Las Vegas Locomotives (2011-2012)
- * Offseason or practice squad member only

Awards and highlights
- First-team All-Pac-10 (2003)

Career NFL statistics
- Games played: 2
- Games started: 1
- Stats at Pro Football Reference

Mark Wilson (born November 11, 1980) is an American former professional football player who was an offensive tackle in the National Football League (NFL). He played college football for the California Golden Bears. He played high school football at Fall River High School in Fall River Mills, California.

== College career ==
He played college football at the University of California, Berkeley.

== Professional career ==
=== Washington Redskins ===
He was selected in the fifth round by the Washington Redskins in the 2004 NFL draft.

=== Minnesota Vikings ===
Wilson was signed to the practice squad of the Minnesota Vikings on September 5, 2005. He re-signed with the team on March 10, 2006. He was released on August 26, 2006.

=== Oakland Raiders ===
In 2006, he signed with the Oakland Raiders. On September 5, 2009, he was released.

=== Las Vegas Locomotives ===
In 2011, he signed with the Las Vegas Locomotives of the United Football League.
