= Lockhart Ferry =

Historical place in Shasta County, United States

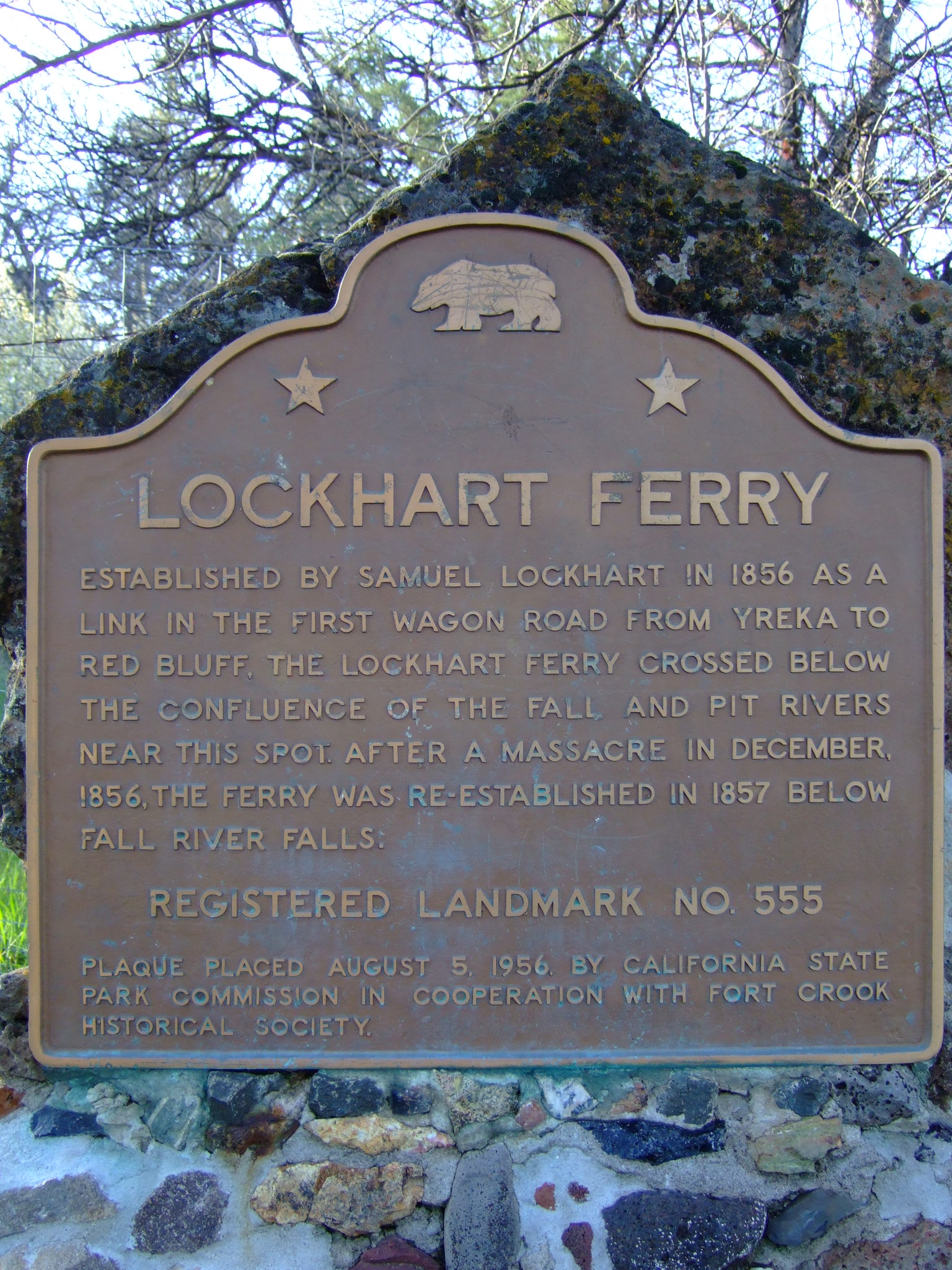
- Lockheart Ferry Marker

- Location within California Location within the United States
- 41.0024°N 121.4436°W
- Location: Fall River Mills, California

History
- Built: 1856

Site notes
- Architect: Samuel Lockhart

California Historical Landmark
- Designated: July 31, 1956
- Reference no.: 555

Lockhart Ferry foundation is a historical site in Fall River Mills, California in Shasta County. Lockhart Ferry site is a California Historical Landmark No. 555 listed on July 31, 1956. In 1856 Samuel Lockhart built a road and ferry, it was the first wagon trail road from the City of Yreka to the City of Red Bluff. To cross the Fall River Lockhart built a cable ferry across the river, just about the Pit River. Due to native tribes attacks in the area in December 1856, the ferry was moved down stream below Fall River Falls in 1857.

In 1855 Sam Lockhart moved from Yreka to the Fall River. Sam Lockhart, his brother Harry and four other pioneers built the Lockhart's Wagon Road. Harry and the four other pioneers were killed in a December 1856 raid by local natives. Sam Lockhart found the died and recruited others to help avenge the deaths. Two groups came to his aid Yreka Volunteer Company and the Red Bluff Volunteers. Later, in the 1860s, Sam Lockhart ran a saloon near Fort Crook. In about 1863, Sam moved to Idaho. He died of a gunshot wound over argument over a mining claim in Idaho.

The historical marker at the site of the Lockhart Ferry is on the north side of California State Route 299, northwest of Long Street. The marker was placed there by California State Park Commission working with the Fort Crook Historical Society on August 5, 1956.

== See also ==
- California Historical Landmarks in Shasta County
