= Fall River (Shasta County, California) =

- Location of mouth

Location
- Country: United States
- State: California
- Region: Shasta County, California
- City: Fall River Mills, California

Physical characteristics
- Source: Thousand Springs, a spring in Shasta County
  - coordinates: 41°06′52″N 121°33′12″W
  - elevation: 3,323 ft (1,013 m)
- Mouth
  - location: Fall River Mills, California
  - coordinates: 41°00′06″N 121°26′18″W
  - elevation: 3,291 ft (1,003 m)

Basin features
- Tributaries
  - left: Spring Creek, Tule River
  - right: Bear Creek

The Fall River is a 21.3-mile-long (34.3 km) river tributary to the Pit River in north-eastern Shasta County in northern California. The Fall River complex, including the Fall River from its origin at Thousand Springs to its confluence with the Pitt River, is designated a Heritage and Wild Trout water.

== History ==
The river was named Fall River by John Frémont in 1848 because of its historic cascades and falls at the terminus of the river.

== Ecology and conservation ==
The Fall River Conservancy and the Fall River Resource Conservation District both work to restore the river. The former has worked with the University of California Davis to study the trout and identified two distinct sub-populations, one adapted to the colder winter flows of Bear Creek and one adapted to the more constant temperature spring-fed waters of Spring Creek and the Fall River mainstem. The large volume of spring water inflow maintains Fall River water temperature at near optimum ranges for trout production, even during mid-summer.

The upper river has historically been characterized by abundant aquatic macrophytes, including extensive meadows of horned pondweed (Zannichellia palustris); however, these have dramatically declined due to excessive sediment deposition from fires in the watershed and channelization of a tributary stream.

== Watershed and course ==
The Fall River watershed drains a 612 square miles (1,590 km^{2}) area that originates from Thousand Springs and is largely spring-fed, with Bear Creek providing the only significant precipitation-related surface flow to the river. Bear Creek rises at a source elevation over 4,803 feet (1,464 m) and flows east to join Fall River at Thousand Springs at an elevation of 3,323 feet (1,013 m). Its other two main tributaries, Spring Creek and the Tule River, are also spring-fed, with the latter originating in the Ahjumawi Lava Springs system. Fall River is a moderate-sized, slow-moving, meandering meadow stream with a mean gradient of less than 1 ft./mile. Spring Creek joins Fall River 5.2 miles below Thousand Springs, and seven miles below Spring Creek, Fall River is joined by Tule River. Since 1922, the river has been dammed before its confluence with the Pit River and diverted through a tunnel under Saddle Mountain to the Pit No. 1 Intake powerhouse, one of many hydroelectric dams on the Pit River.

Fall River course.
description	coordinates
confluence, Bear Creek	41.114441,-121.556253
road, Metzger	41.097594,-121.548185
road, Island	41.08857,-121.493297
confluence, from Horr Pond	41.072363,-121.463814
road, MacArthur	41.062398,-121.481667
dam, Fall River Lake	41.008338,-121.44742
road, CA 299	41.003091,-121.441412
mouth, @ Pit River	41.0015521 -121.4383139

== See also ==
- Pit River
