= Fall River Mills, California =

Unincorporated community in California

Fall River Mills
- Unincorporated community Census-designated place
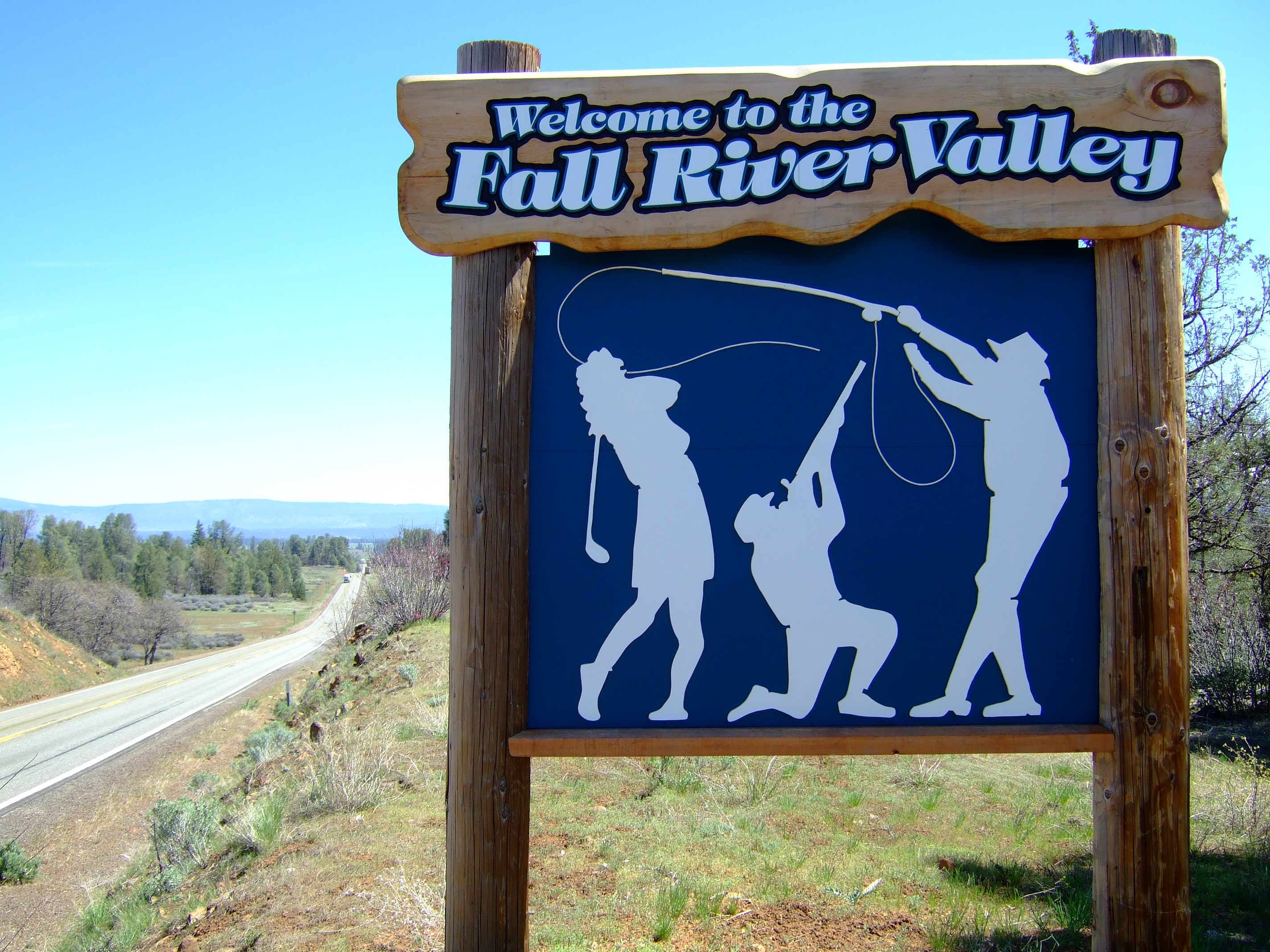
- Sign welcoming visitors to Fall River Valley

- Location in Shasta County and the state of California
- Coordinates: 41°0′21″N 121°26′27″W
- Country: United States
- State: California
- County: Shasta
- Settled: 1855
- Founder: William H. Winters

Government
  - Type: Municipal

Area
  - Total: 2.75 sq mi (7.13 km^{2})
  - Land: 2.65 sq mi (6.86 km^{2})
  - Water: 0.10 sq mi (0.27 km^{2}) 3.77%
- Elevation: 3,327 ft (1,014 m)

Population (2020)
  - Total: 616
  - Density: 232.6/sq mi (89.8/km^{2})
- Time zone: UTC-8 (Pacific (PST))
  - Summer (DST): UTC-7 (PDT)
- ZIP code: 96028
- Area code: 530
- FIPS code: 06-23532
- GNIS feature ID: 0260035
- Website: Town of Fall River Mills Website

Fall River Mills, colloquially referred to as Fall River, is an unincorporated town and census-designated place (CDP) in Shasta County, California, United States. Its population is 616 as of the 2020 census, up from 573 from the 2010 census.

The town lies in the Fall River Valley between the Sierra Nevada and Cascade ranges, and is named for the nearby spring-fed Fall River. The U.S. Army established Fort Crook in the valley in 1857. Fall River Mills Airport is the only airport within 75 miles (121 km) of Redding and Alturas.

== History ==
Fort Crook, a U.S. Army post, was established in the Fall River Valley on July 1, 1857, by Lieutenant George Crook to protect immigrants and settlers. It was later commanded by Captains John W. Gardner and McGregor. The fort site, near Glenburn, is California Historical Landmark No. 355.

== Geography and geology ==
Fall River Mills is located at 41°0′21″N 121°26′27″W (41.005760, -121.440946).

Fall River Mills lies between the Sierra Nevada and the Cascade mountain ranges in the far northeastern corner of Shasta County. The town is surrounded by mountains in all four cardinal directions with Mount Shasta and Mount Lassen visible from anywhere in the Fall River Valley.

Elevation varies only slightly throughout the valley floor, ranging from 3,200 feet (980 m) to 3,400 feet (1,000 m). The surrounding passes all vary from 3,600 feet (1,100 m) to 4,200 feet (1,300 m)+ feet.

According to the United States Census Bureau, the CDP has a total area of 2.8 square miles (7.3 km^{2}), of which 2.6 square miles (6.7 km^{2}) is land and 0.1 square miles (0.26 km^{2}) (3.77%) is water.

Fall River Mills is named after one of the rivers (Fall River) which runs near it. This river, along with the Pit River, water the Fall River Valley, wherein Fall River Mills is located. Much of this valley and its surroundings are volcanic, with all the features which come with such terrain.

== Climate ==
According to the Köppen climate classification system, Fall River Mills has a warm-summer Mediterranean climate, abbreviated "Csb" on climate maps.

Climate data for Fall River Mills, California
Month	Jan	Feb	Mar	Apr	May	Jun	Jul	Aug	Sep	Oct	Nov	Dec	Year
Record high °F (°C)	66 (19)	72 (22)	79 (26)	86 (30)	92 (33)	103 (39)	106 (41)	104 (40)	103 (39)	94 (34)	82 (28)	63 (17)	106 (41)
Mean daily maximum °F (°C)	43.0 (6.1)	47.9 (8.8)	54.5 (12.5)	62.4 (16.9)	70.8 (21.6)	78.2 (25.7)	87.6 (30.9)	86.4 (30.2)	80.4 (26.9)	68.6 (20.3)	54.9 (12.7)	44.7 (7.1)	65.2 (18.4)
Mean daily minimum °F (°C)	20.7 (−6.3)	24.2 (−4.3)	29.0 (−1.7)	34.3 (1.3)	40.3 (4.6)	45.9 (7.7)	49.9 (9.9)	46.4 (8.0)	40.9 (4.9)	33.4 (0.8)	26.6 (−3.0)	22.6 (−5.2)	34.5 (1.4)
Record low °F (°C)	−18 (−28)	−15 (−26)	3 (−16)	10 (−12)	24 (−4)	28 (−2)	35 (2)	30 (−1)	21 (−6)	7 (−14)	−17 (−27)	−18 (−28)	27.4 (−2.6)
Average precipitation inches (mm)	2.69 (68)	2.38 (60)	2.20 (56)	1.53 (39)	1.22 (31)	0.85 (22)	0.18 (4.6)	0.18 (4.6)	0.47 (12)	1.23 (31)	2.35 (60)	2.94 (75)	18.22 (463.2)
Average snowfall inches (cm)	8.4 (21)	4.1 (10)	3.2 (8.1)	3.6 (9.1)	0.9 (2.3)	0.1 (0.25)	0 (0)	0 (0)	0.5 (1.3)	0.4 (1.0)	2.7 (6.9)	11 (28)	34.9 (89)
Average precipitation days	8	6	7	5	7	6	1	2	2	4	8	10	66
Source 1: WeatherBase
Source 2: National Weather Service

== Demographics ==
Historical population
Census	Pop.	Note	%±
2000	648		—
2010	573		−11.6%
2020	616		7.5%
U.S. Decennial Census; 1860–1870 1880–1890; 1900 1910 1920; 1930 1940 1950; 1960 1970 1980; 1990 2000 2010

Fall River Mills first appeared as a Census-designated place in the 2000 U.S. census.

=== 2020 ===
The 2020 United States census reported that Fall River Mills had a population of 616. The population density was 232.6 inhabitants per square mile (89.8/km^{2}). The racial makeup of Fall River Mills was 487 (79.1%) White, 0 (0.0%) African American, 45 (7.3%) Native American, 3 (0.5%) Asian, 1 (0.2%) Pacific Islander, 43 (7.0%) from other races, and 37 (6.0%) from two or more races. Hispanic or Latino of any race were 84 persons (13.6%).

The census reported that 87.5% of the population lived in households and 12.5% were institutionalized.

There were 226 households, out of which 61 (27.0%) had children under the age of 18 living in them, 91 (40.3%) were married-couple households, 22 (9.7%) were cohabiting couple households, 54 (23.9%) had a female householder with no partner present, and 59 (26.1%) had a male householder with no partner present. 77 households (34.1%) were one person, and 28 (12.4%) were one person aged 65 or older. The average household size was 2.38. There were 134 families (59.3% of all households).

The age distribution was 132 people (21.4%) under the age of 18, 30 people (4.9%) aged 18 to 24, 119 people (19.3%) aged 25 to 44, 111 people (18.0%) aged 45 to 64, and 224 people (36.4%) who were 65 years of age or older. The median age was 50.4 years. For every 100 females, there were 77.0 males.

There were 256 housing units at an average density of 96.7 units per square mile (37.3 units/km^{2}), of which 226 (88.3%) were occupied. Of these, 95 (42.0%) were owner-occupied, and 131 (58.0%) were occupied by renters.

=== 2010 ===
The 2010 United States census reported that Fall River Mills had a population of 573. The population density was 208.2 inhabitants per square mile (80.4/km^{2}). The racial makeup of Fall River Mills was 450 (78.5%) White, 0 (0.0%) African American, 30 (5.2%) Native American, 3 (0.5%) Asian, 2 (0.3%) Pacific Islander, 56 (9.8%) from other races, and 32 (5.6%) from two or more races. Hispanic or Latino of any race were 105 persons (18.3%).

The Census reported that 535 people (93.4% of the population) lived in households, 9 (1.6%) lived in non-institutionalized group quarters, and 29 (5.1%) were institutionalized.

There were 228 households, out of which 71 (31.1%) had children under the age of 18 living in them, 93 (40.8%) were opposite-sex married couples living together, 26 (11.4%) had a female householder with no husband present, 13 (5.7%) had a male householder with no wife present. There were 15 (6.6%) unmarried opposite-sex partnerships, and 1 (0.4%) same-sex married couples or partnerships. 83 households (36.4%) were made up of individuals, and 41 (18.0%) had someone living alone who was 65 years of age or older. The average household size was 2.35. There were 132 families (57.9% of all households); the average family size was 3.11.

The population was spread out, with 140 people (24.4%) under the age of 18, 56 people (9.8%) aged 18 to 24, 107 people (18.7%) aged 25 to 44, 147 people (25.7%) aged 45 to 64, and 123 people (21.5%) who were 65 years of age or older. The median age was 41.8 years. For every 100 females, there were 96.2 males. For every 100 females age 18 and over, there were 86.6 males.

There were 280 housing units at an average density of 101.7 per square mile (39.3/km^{2}), of which 128 (56.1%) were owner-occupied, and 100 (43.9%) were occupied by renters. The homeowner vacancy rate was 6.4%; the rental vacancy rate was 8.9%. 285 people (49.7% of the population) lived in owner-occupied housing units and 250 people (43.6%) lived in rental housing units.

== Production and industry ==
The community is known for its agriculture, producing cattle, Fall River wild rice, garlic, mint, hay, lavender, and alfalfa.

== Tourism ==
The town of Fall River Mills is located in the Fall River Valley, between the two volcanic mountain peaks of Mount Shasta and Mount Lassen.

Fall River is a spring-fed stream that winds for 16 miles (26 km), mostly through private agricultural land with access points open to the public. The river has rainbow trout fishing holes. Fall River is piped through Saddle Mountain, to end at the Pit 1 Power House. There is white water rafting and fly fishing on the creeks in the area.

The weather can be very cold in the winter, while the spring, summer, and early fall has warm days and cool nights. The town is a traditional Northern California agricultural community. It is known for its wild rice, cattle, hay, lavender, and mint.

== Recreation ==
The Fall River Valley offers recreation for people of all ages and backgrounds with opportunities being numerous. These include many annual events, festivals and fairs. The Fall River Valley is home to a World Class Golf course. multiple locations for Mountain Climbing and Spelunking. Sport angling including Fly Fishing, with several tournaments and derbies held each year. Hunting in the Fall River Valley offers several big game species and upland game and waterfowl.

Boating and Canoeing are popular in the Fall River Valley as it is home to several Lakes including Fall River Lake, Eastman Lake and Big Lake. White Water Rafting is among several popular sporting activities that take advantage of the river systems in the valley. These tributaries include the Fall River, Tule River, Ja-She Creek, Lava Creek, Bear Creek, Shelly Creek and Pit River. Together they span much of the Valley forming one of the largest systems of fresh water springs in the country. These waters culminate in a splendid waterfall south of the Town of Fall River Mills and again at a viewing point off State Highway 299 West of Fall River Mills. The Valley is home to the Ahjumawi Lava Springs State Park, located north of the Fall River-McArthur Town Center. This state park is unique in that it is accessible only by water.

Local arts and culture can be viewed in several artists galleries and gift shops throughout the community. Equestrian and Rodeo Events are held throughout the year with the Intermountain Fair Rodeo being the mainstay event.

Several parks are situated throughout the community, offering family activities and sporting venues. These include Clark Field, Fall River Lions Community Park and the Joe Bruce Sports Complex.

Cycling has been extremely popular in the Valley for over a decade. Hundreds of cyclists come from throughout the country each year to participate in the Fall River Century Bike Ride which is held in late spring.

== Local government ==
Local government in Fall River Mills includes:

- Fall River Valley Municipal Advisory Council
- Fall River Valley Community Services District
- Fall River Valley Fire Protection District
- Fall River Mills Cemetery District
- Mayers Memorial Hospital District
- Fall River Mills Joint Unified School District
- Fall River Resource Conservation District

== Politics ==
In the state legislature Fall River Mills is in the 1st senatorial district, represented by Republican Megan Dahle, and the 1st Assembly district, represented by Republican Heather Hadwick.

Federally, Fall River Mills is in California's 1st congressional district, represented by Republican James Gallagher.

Plans for the Incorporation of the Fall River Mills communities into a City or Town were started. Stemming from public outcry due to development plans and a need for the local communities to maintain control over the area. Formation of a Municipal Advisory Council or MAC is ongoing. The MAC will be the political and authoritative voice of the Fall River Mills communities to not only Shasta County but the State of California. Plans are also being drafted for the implementation of several municipal services to include but not be limited to, Parks & Recreation, Police Department, Transportation, Community Facilities, Animal Control, Cemetery, Fire and Emergency Services. These are just a few of the services listed as proposed by the town of Fall River Mills and the Fall River Valley Community Services District. Areas proposed for inclusion in the incorporation are the communities of Fall River Mills, McArthur, Pittville, Glenburn and Dana.

== Education ==
- Fall River Joint Unified School District
- Elementary Schools
  - Fall River Elementary School (K-6) "a California Distinguished School"
  - Fall River Elementary Community Day School (K-6)
- High School
  - Fall River Jr and Sr High School (7–12) "a California Distinguished School"
  - Fall River Community Day School (7–12)
  - Soldier Mt Continuation School (9–12)
- Alternative Schools
  - Migrant Child Education (K-12)

== Transportation ==
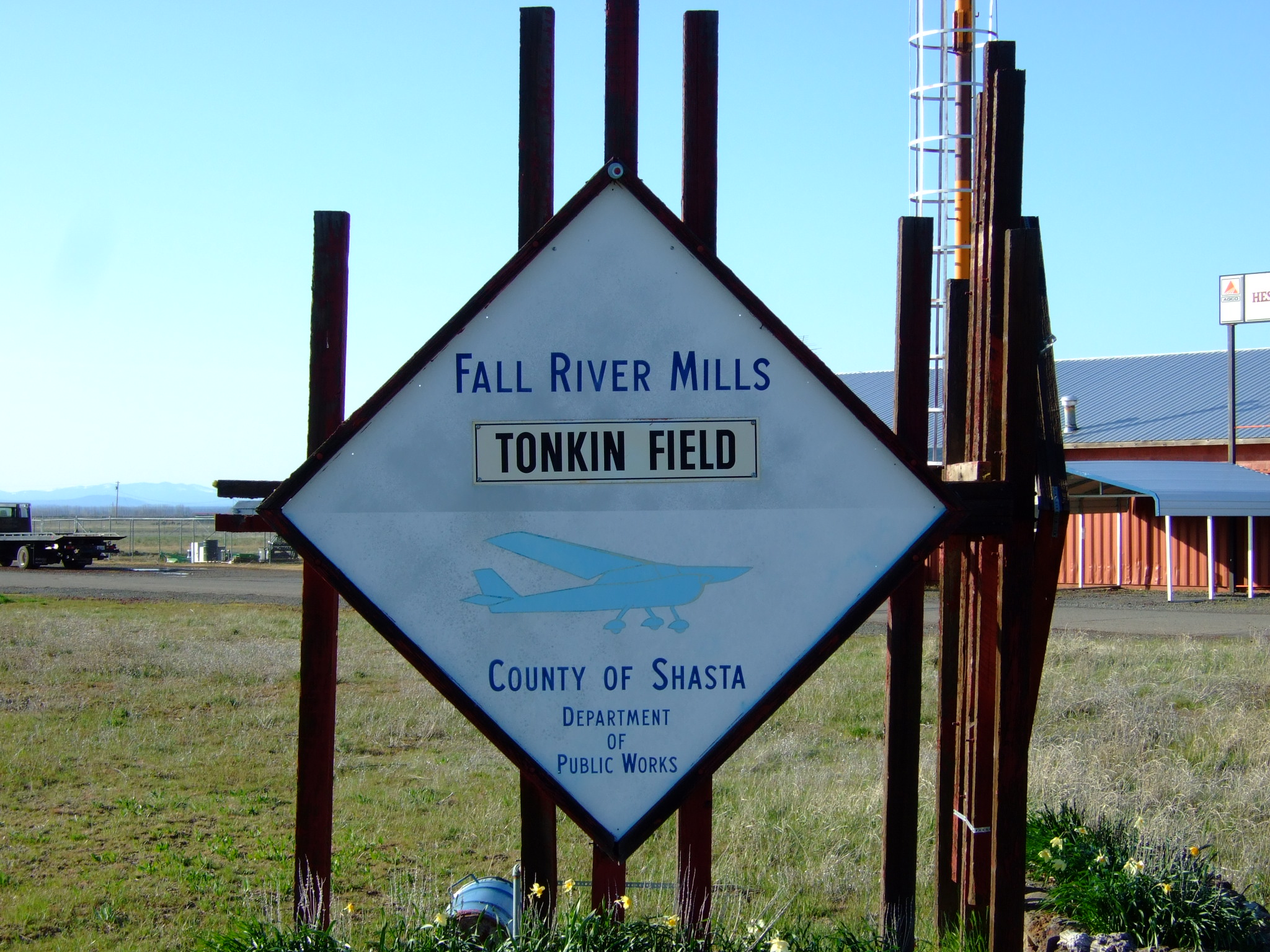
Sign for Fall River Mills Airport.

Fall River Mills Airport, Tonkin Field (FAA LID: O89) is a public airport located off Main Street, in downtown Fall River Mills, serving Shasta County. The airport has one runway and is mostly used for general aviation. It is the only airport within 75 miles (121 km) of Redding and Alturas.

The airport was originally built in the 1940s as a location to train pilots for World War II. Over the years, the airport has been maintained and upgraded largely due to funding provided from the California Aid to Airports Program (CAAP). Today the airport has nine permanent t-hangars, five Portable hangars, approximately 30 tie-downs, and provides aviation fuel sales. The airport is equipped with runway lights which are designed to be turned on at night by the pilots as they approach the airport.

== Notable people ==
Please note: Not all the following people actually reside in Fall River Mills. Many only own property in the area.

- George Crook (September 8, 1828 – March 21, 1890) was a career Army officer, noted for distinguished service during American Civil War and Indian Wars.
- William Hanna, creator of beloved cartoon series Tom and Jerry, The Flintstones, The Jetsons, Scooby-Doo and many others.
- Dan Hawkins, football head coach, UC Davis, Colorado and Boise State; born in Fall River Mills.
- Bing Crosby, actor and singer, spearheaded fundraising efforts to build and furnish Fall River Mills's only hospital.
- Jamie Pineda of Fall River Mills, frontwoman of pop music project Sweetbox.
- Mark Wilson of Fall River Mills, offensive tackle for NFL's Oakland Raiders.

== Gallery ==
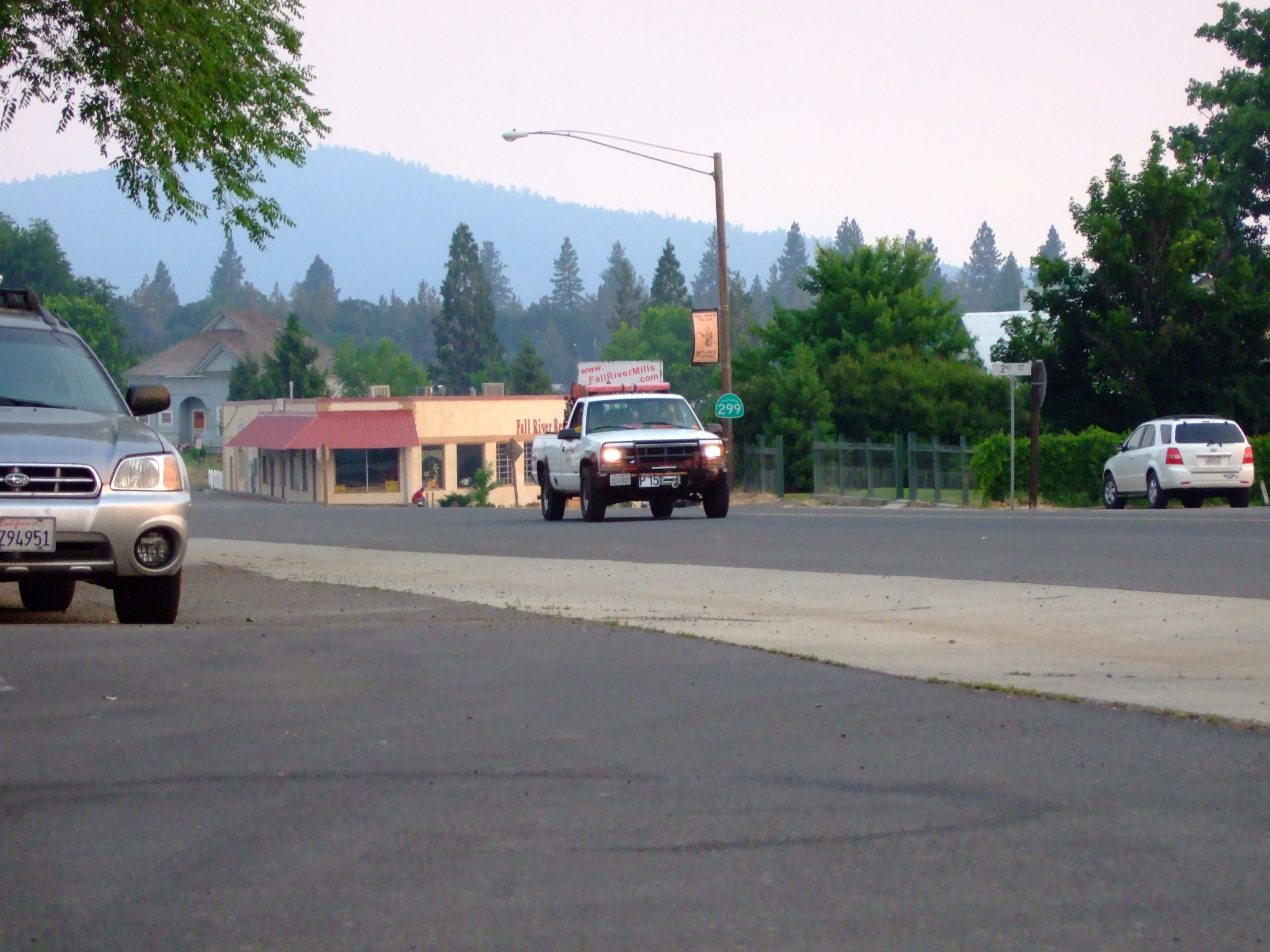
Hwy 299 West, Fall River Mills.

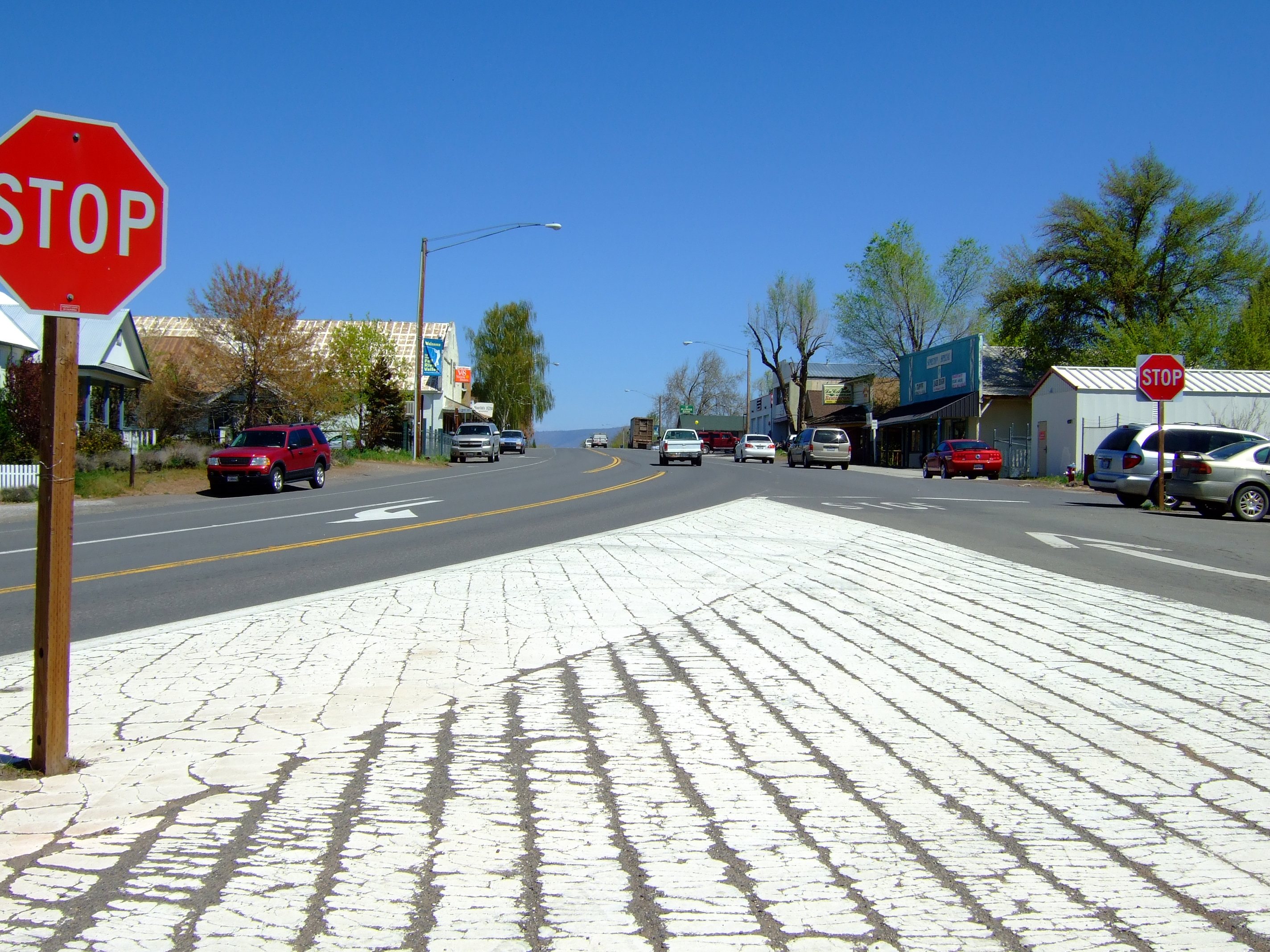
Hwy 299 East & Main Street, Fall River Mills.

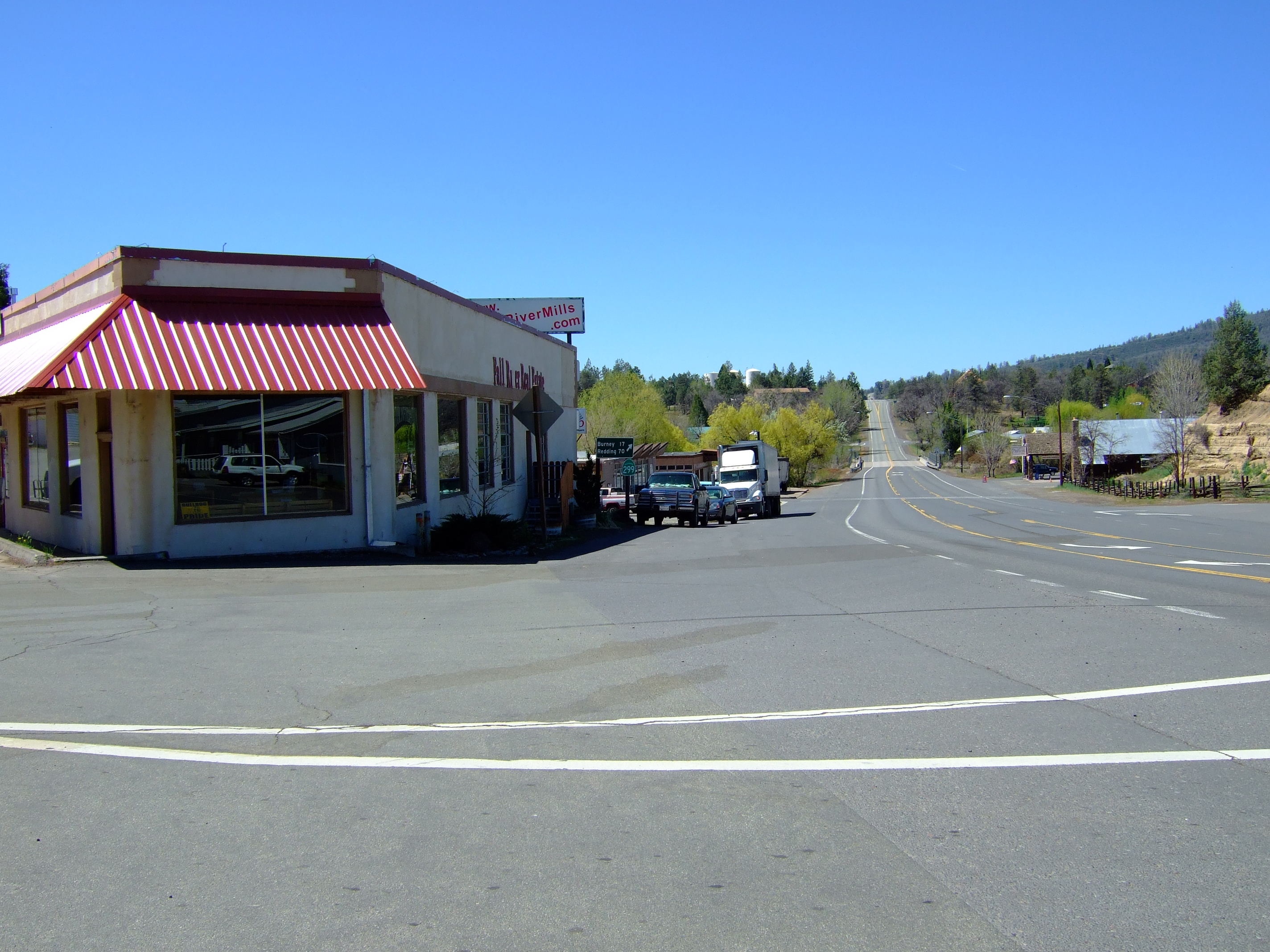
Hwy 299 West & Main Street, Fall River Mills.

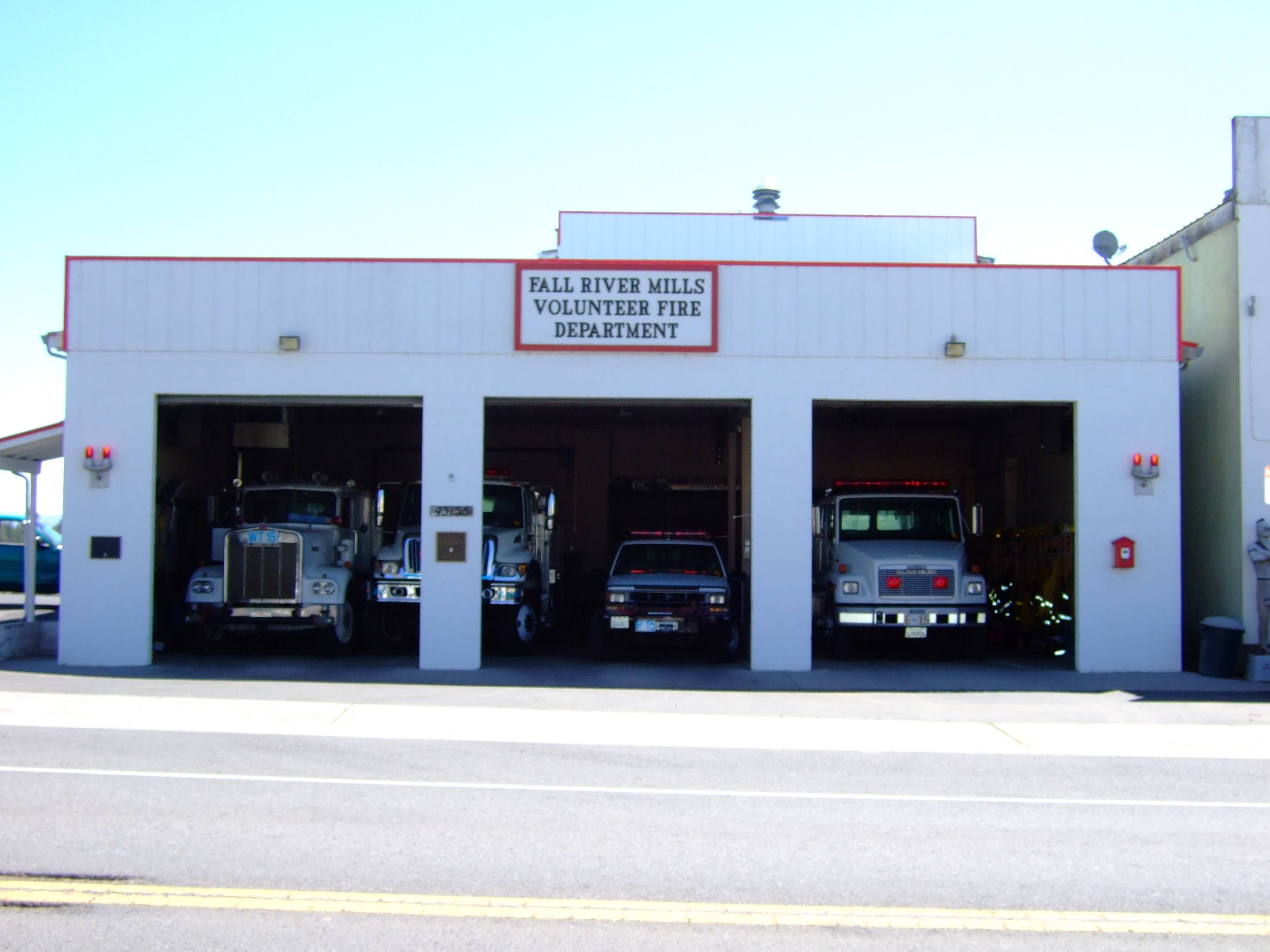
The Fall River Mills Fire Department.

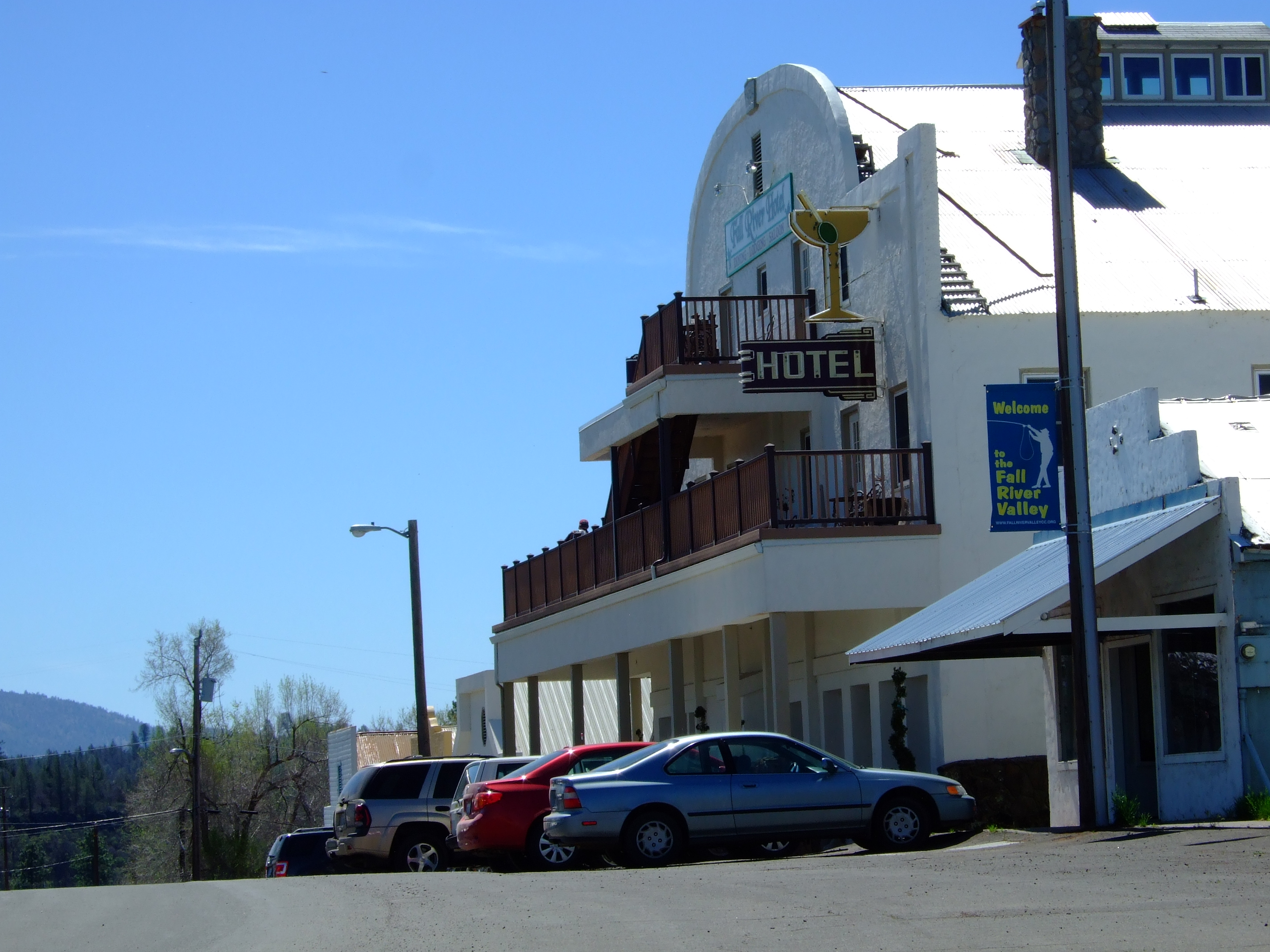
The Historic Fall River Hotel.

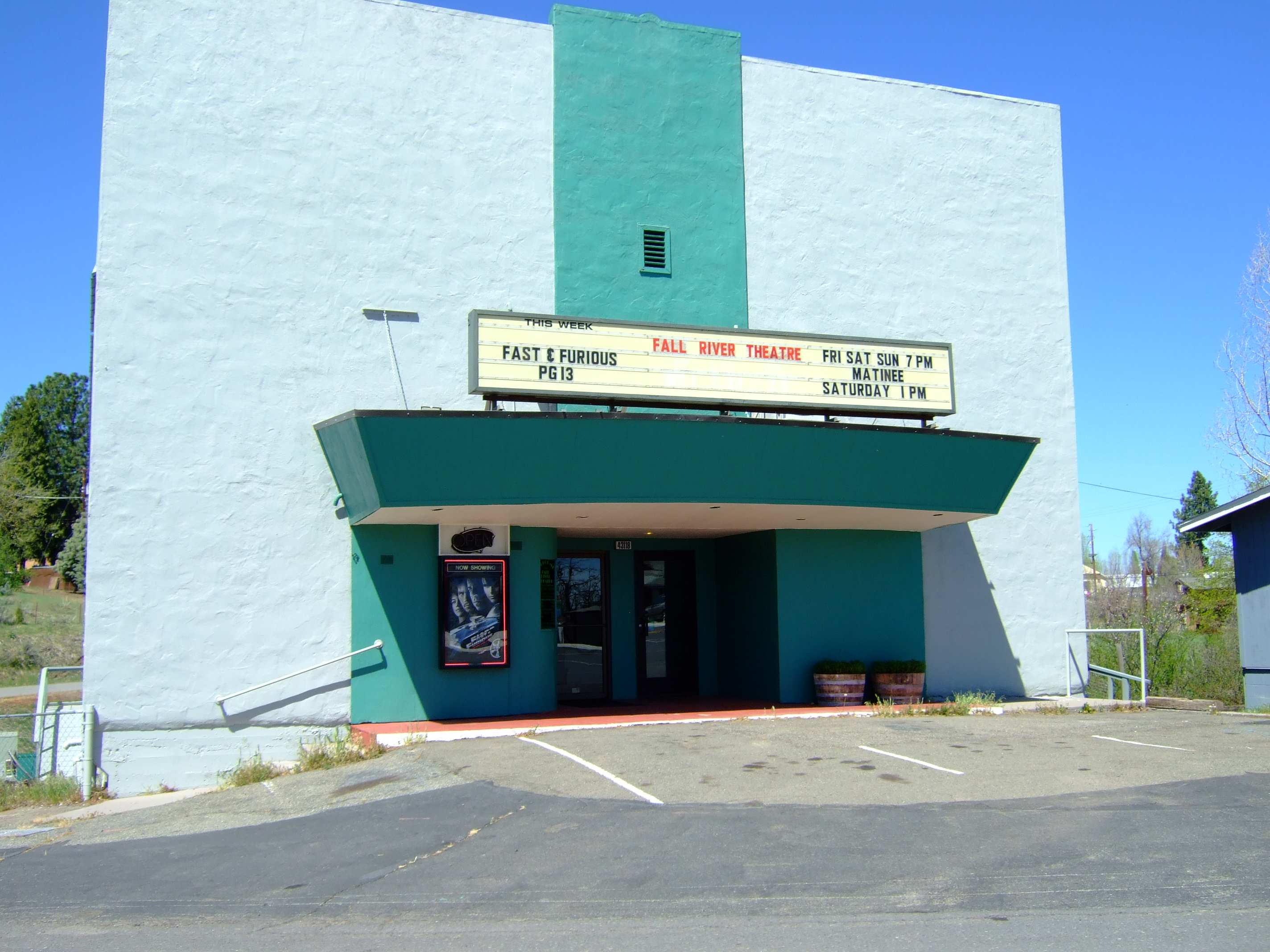
The Fall River Mills Theatre.

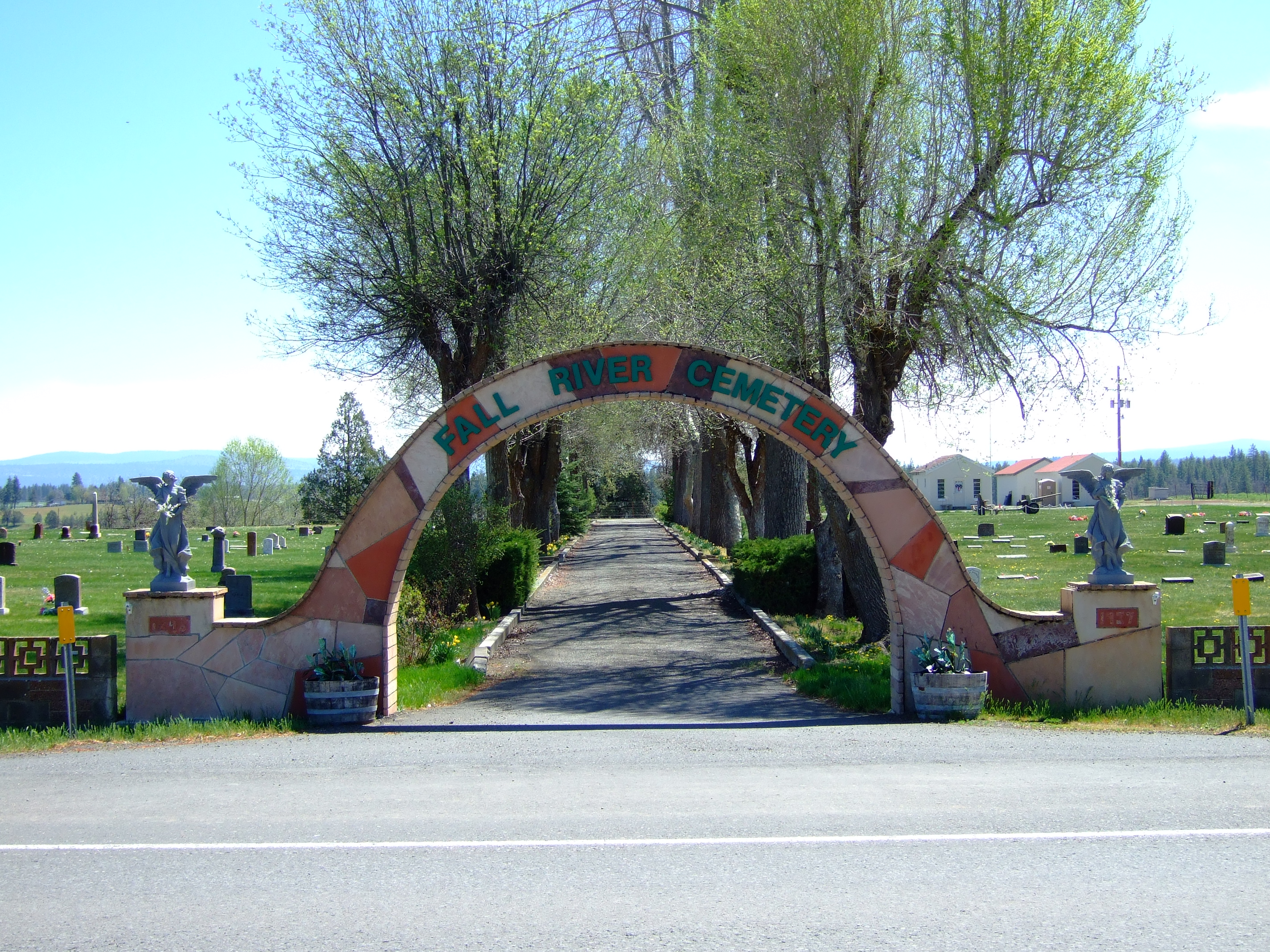
The Fall River Mills Cemetery.

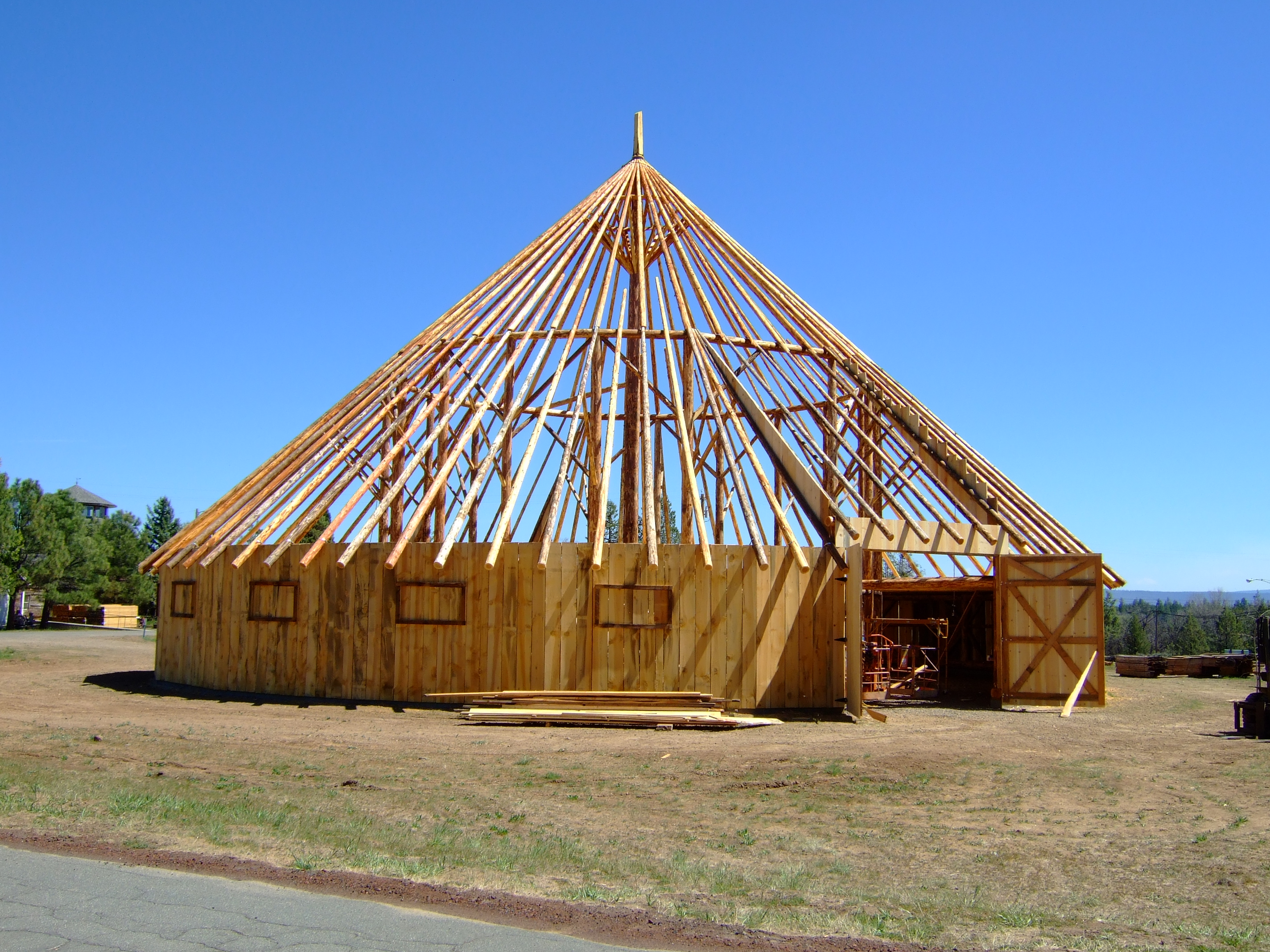
Reconstruction of the Historic Round Barn.

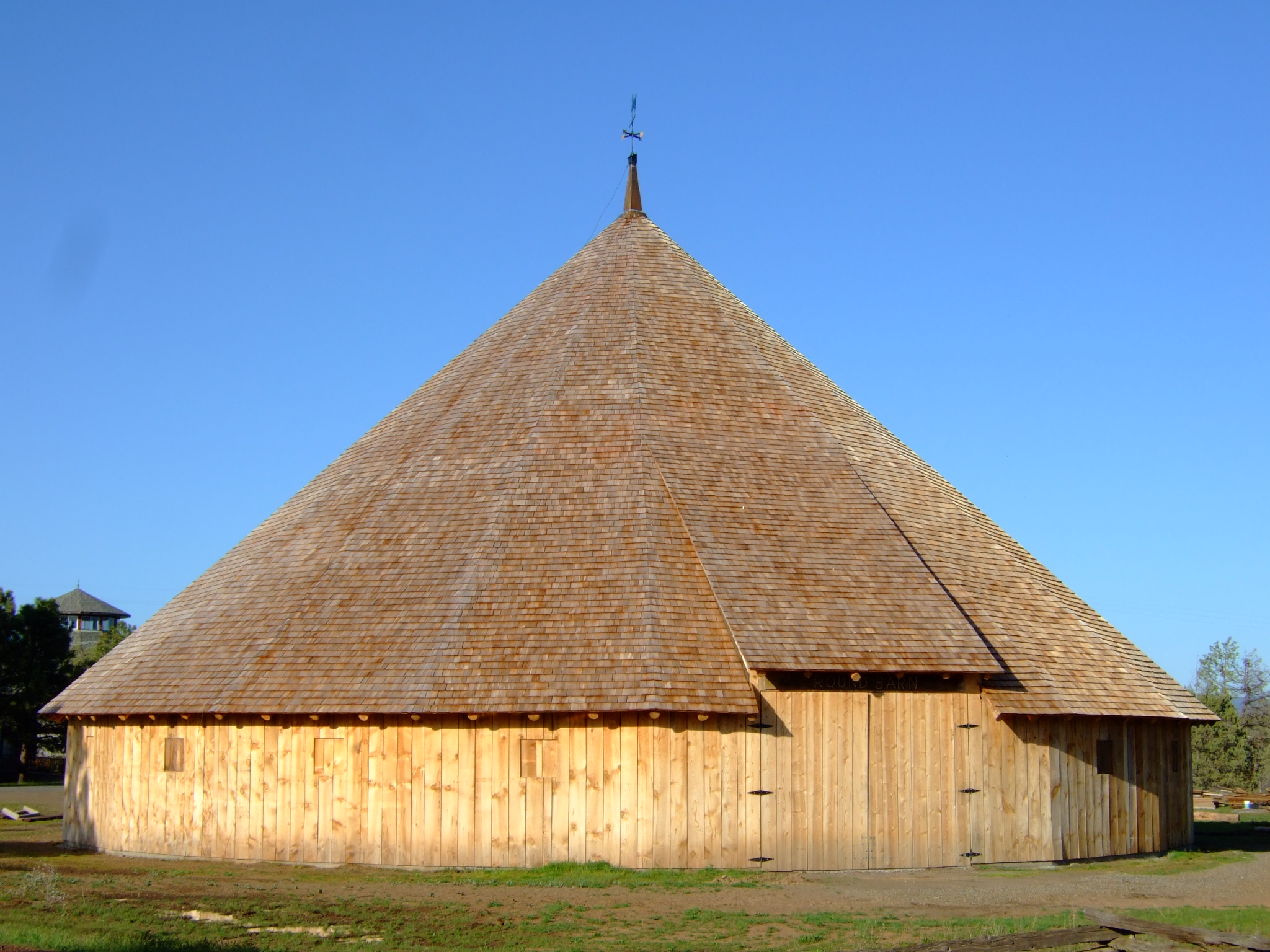
Completed Reconstruction of the Historic Round Barn.

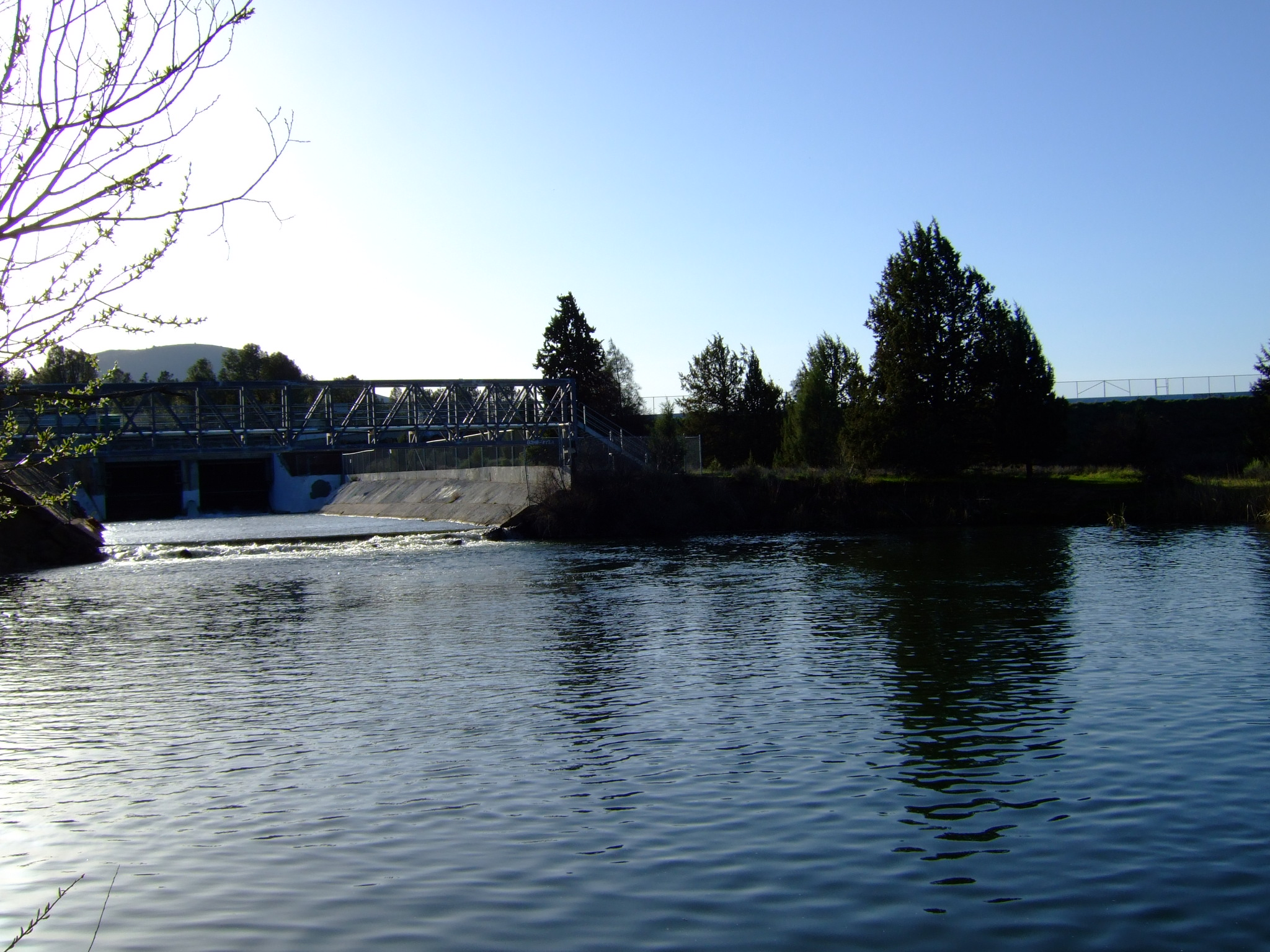
Fall River Mills Dam Complex.

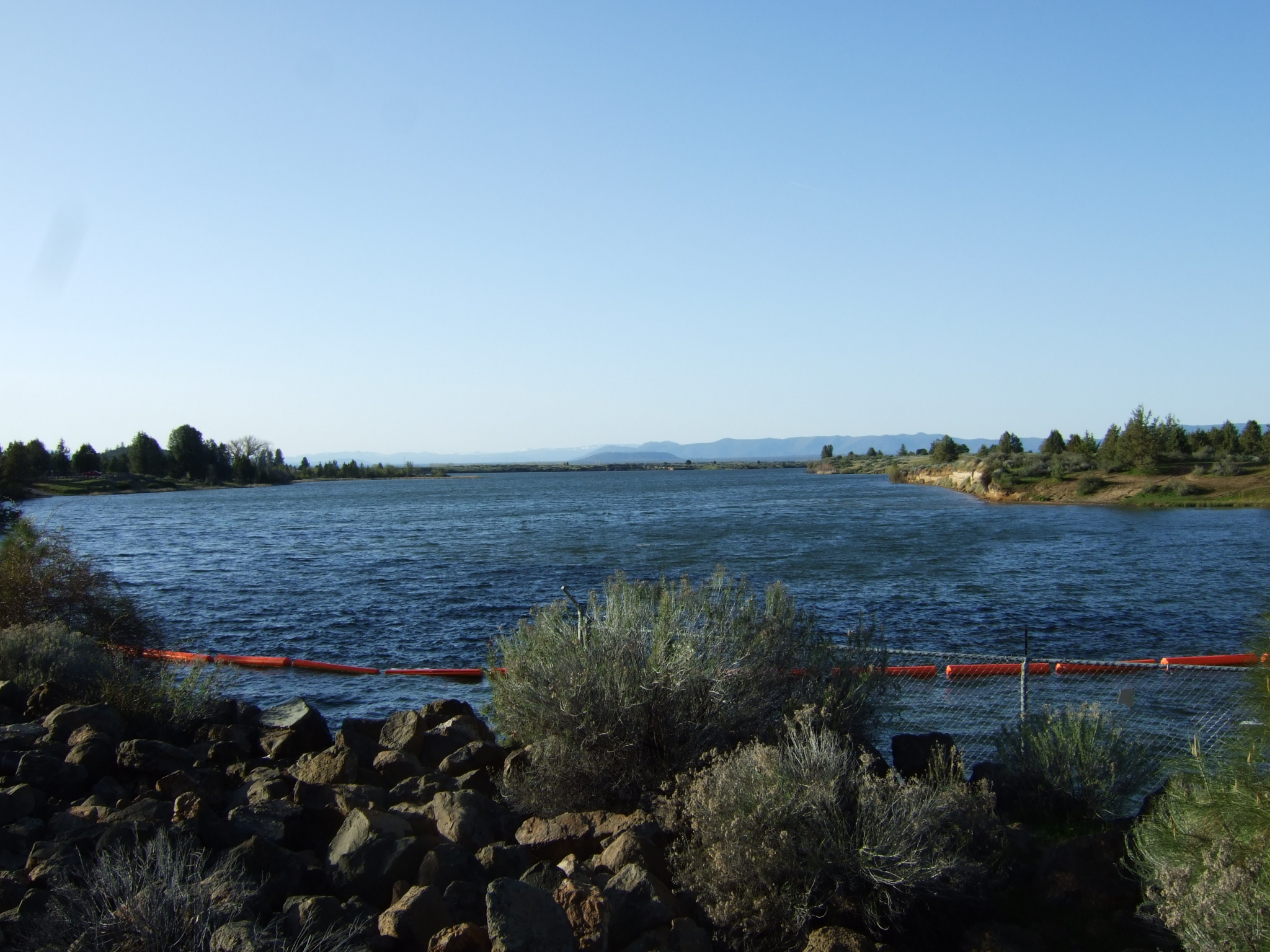
Fall River Lake, Fall River Mills

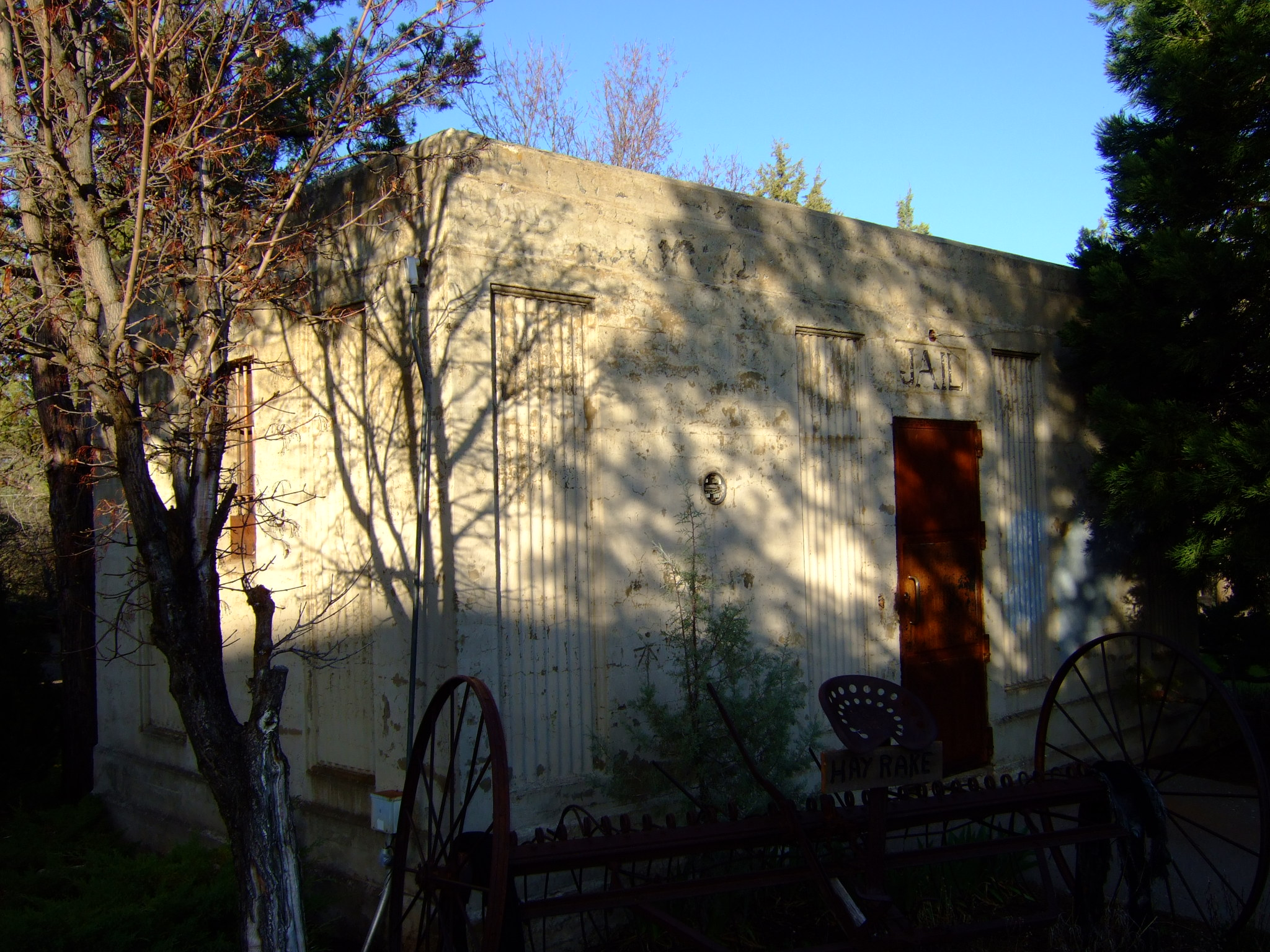
Fall River Mills Jailhouse, Circa 1900s.

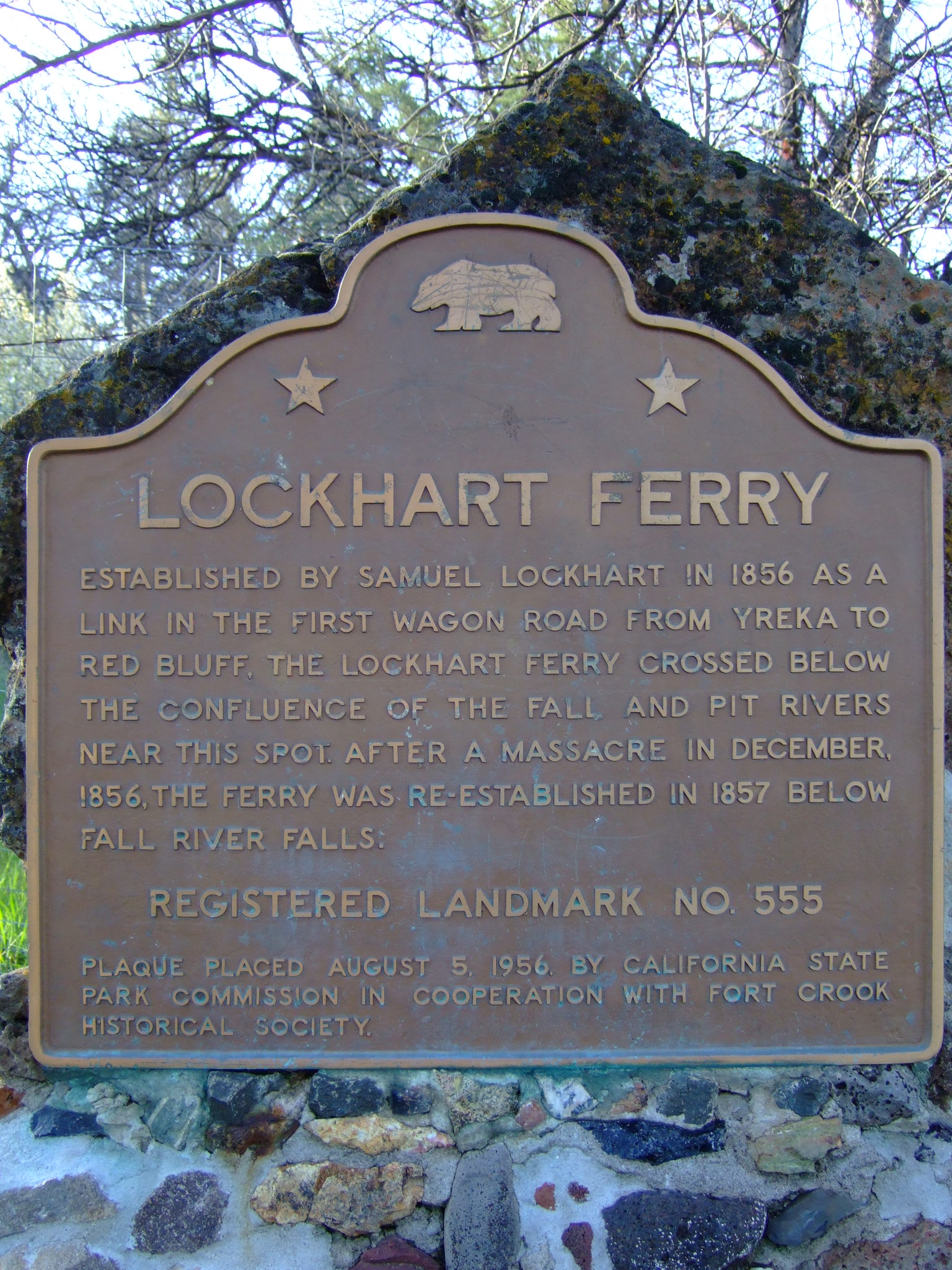
Lockhart Ferry Historical Marker, Fall River Mills
