= Dana, California =

Unincorporated community in California, United States

Dana is a populated place located in Shasta County, California, United States, along County Road A-19 (McArthur Road). It was established in 1881 and named for Loren Dana.

Dana shares the zip code 96028 with Fall River Mills.

Dana is 3,333 feet above sea level and located at 41°06′42″N 121°33′53″W.
